= Naples yellow =

Lead-antimonate inorganic pigment used in paintings

Naples Yellow

Color coordinates
- Hex triplet: #FADA5E
- sRGB^{B} (r, g, b): (250, 218, 94)
- HSV (h, s, v): (48°, 62%, 98%)
- CIELCh_{uv} (L, C, h): (88, 81, 70°)
- Source: ISCC-NBS
- ISCC–NBS descriptor: Brilliant yellow
- B: Normalized to [0–255] (byte)

Naples yellow, also called antimony yellow or lead antimonate yellow, is an inorganic pigment that largely replaced lead-tin-yellow and has been used in European paintings since the seventeenth century. While the mineral orpiment is considered to be the oldest yellow pigment, Naples yellow, like Egyptian blue, is one of the oldest known synthetic pigments. Naples yellow was used in ancient Egypt and Mesopotamia, finding widespread application during the Hellenistic and Roman periods. Prior to its earliest occurrences in European paintings, the pigment was commonly employed in pottery, glazes, enamels, and glass. The pigment ranged in hue from a muted, earthy, reddish yellow to a bright light yellow.

A Latin treatise from the late 17th century by Andrea Pozzo referred to the pigment as luteolum napolitanum, which is the first recorded use of the term "Naples yellow"; its English name first appeared in print in 1738. Naples yellow originally referred to the chemical compound lead antimonate (Pb_{2}Sb_{2}O_{7}), but by the middle of the nineteenth century, a majority of manufacturers had stopped producing pure lead antimonate. Since then, writers and artists have incorrectly used Naples yellow to refer to other lead-based yellows. The related mineral of lead antimonate is bindheimite. However, this natural version was rarely employed as a pigment. After 1800, Naples yellow was superseded by chrome yellow (lead chromate) cadmium sulfide, and cobalt yellow.

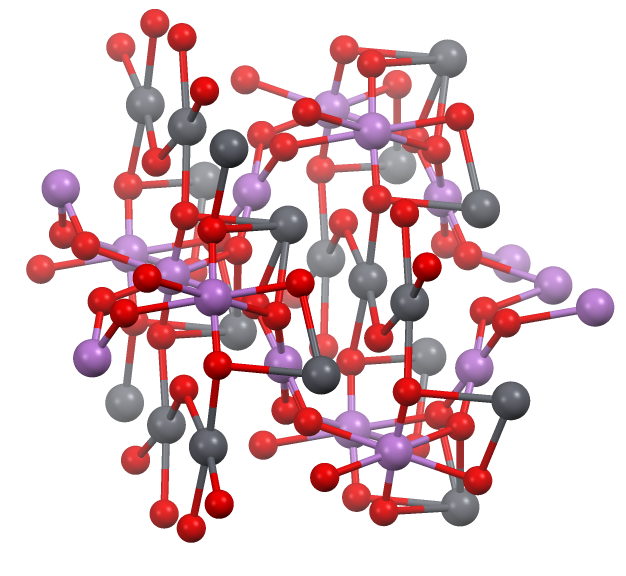
Portion of the dilead antimonate (Pb_{2}Sb_{2}O_{7}) structure (black = Pb, violet = Sb, red = O). This structure illustrates the complex, polymeric nature of many inorganic pigments.

== History ==
Naples yellow is one of the earliest synthetic pigments, its earliest uses dating from the period between the sixteenth and fourteenth century BC in ancient Egypt and Mesopotamia. Traces of Naples yellow have been discovered on glass fragments, glazed bricks, and glazed tiles from these ancient civilizations. Since its basic components, such as lead oxide and antimony oxide, had to be chemically manufactured, its early production would have required a high level of knowledge and skill. Early color theorists speculated that Naples yellow had originated from Naples or Italy's Mount Vesuvius. It was not until the late eighteenth century that Naples yellow was generally recognized as a synthetic pigment of lead antimonate.

The Italians first adopted Naples yellow as an enamel for tin-glazed pottery, or maiolica, from the beginning of the sixteenth century. The pigment then started to appear in European paintings, and between 1750 and 1850, when it achieved greater popularity in the art world. "Naples yellow" was a phrase that was first used in a treatise on frescos by Andrea Pozzo, published in Rome between 1693 and 1700. There, Pozzo refers to Naples yellow as luteolum napolitanum. By 1850, Naples yellow was sold in a variety of shades, such as French Naples yellow.Manufacturers like C. Roberson and Co. produced Naples yellow until 1885. However, its popularity declined and it was progressively replaced by other yellow pigments like lead chromate and cadmium sulfide. Manufacturers today typically produce Naples yellow in combination with other pigments, such as ochre, iron oxide, lead white, titanium white, or zinc white, rather than pure lead antimonate.

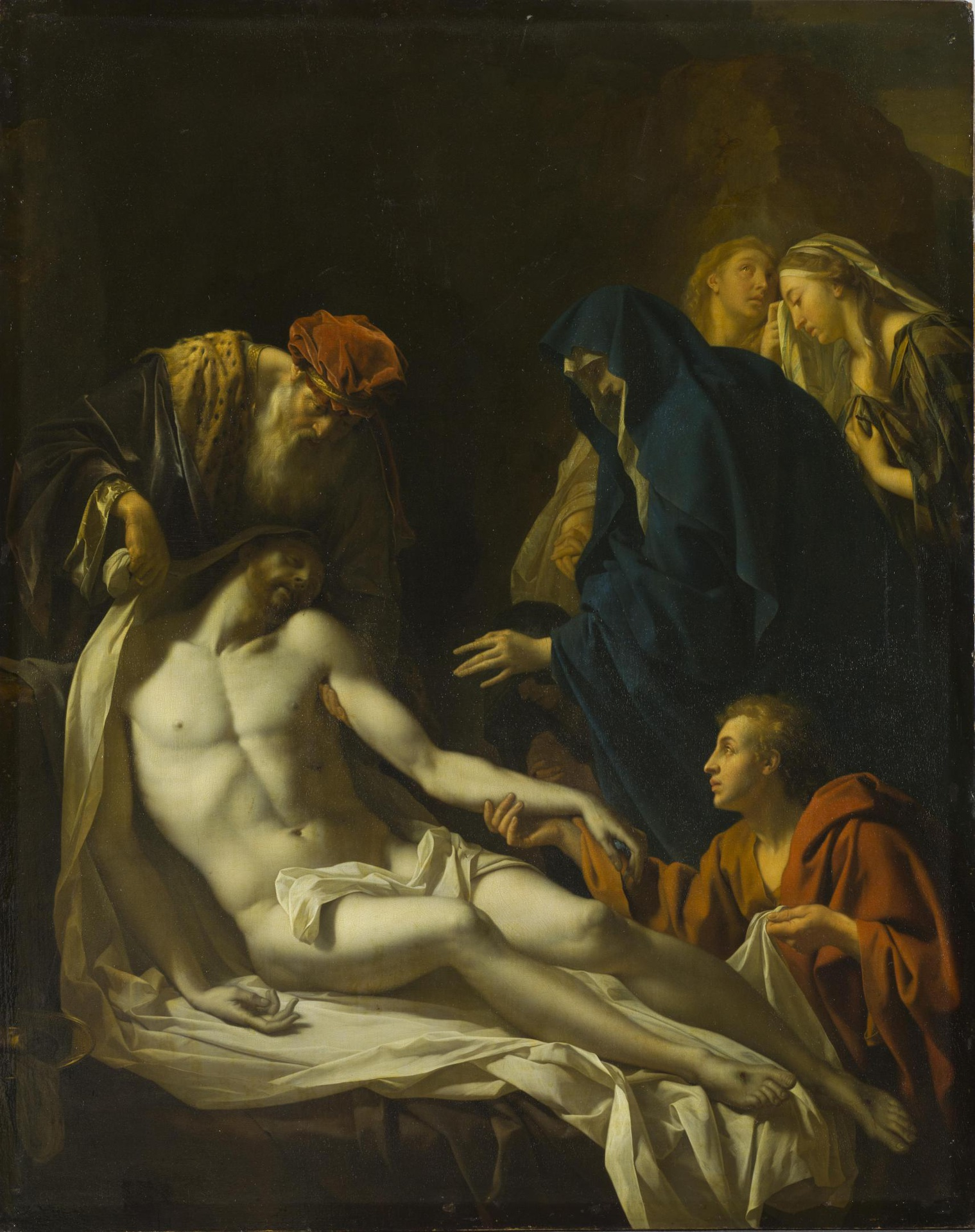
Adriaen van der Werff, Entombment of Christ, 1703. An early European painting that used Naples yellow.

== Visual characteristics ==
Naples yellow is a saturated yellow, occasionally with pink or off-white hues. It has a strong hiding power and effectively covers other pigments. Temperature during production affects its hue. A more vibrant lemon-yellow is produced at higher temperatures, whereas an orange-yellow is produced at lower temperatures. Some manufacturers also note that there are six different shades of Naples yellow, ranging from a greenish yellow to a pinkish orange yellow.

== Permanence ==
Naples yellow is not a stable pigment. It is susceptible to discoloration in humid air. George Field warned that Naples yellow can turn black. Naples yellow can also discolor in the presence of iron. Field therefore advised artists to use a palette knife made of ivory or horn, not metal.

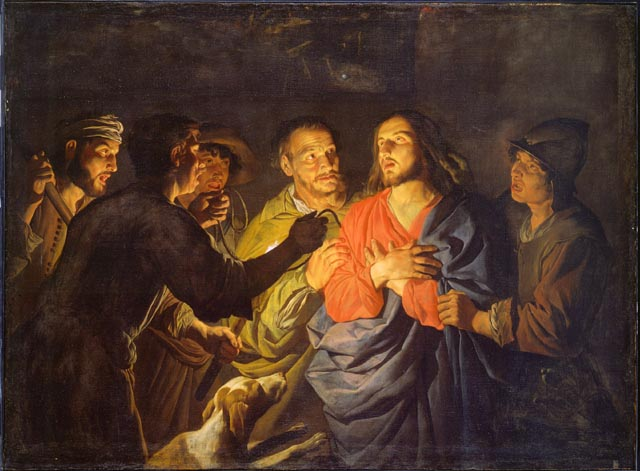
Matthias Stom, The Arrest of Christ, c. 1630–1632. The earliest occurrence of Naples yellow in European painting.

== Notable occurrences ==
Naples yellow was frequently used in ancient times to glaze pottery and glass. A piece of glass from the site of Amenhotep II's palace at Thebes (now at the Victoria and Albert Museum) is one of the earliest known examples. Naples yellow has frequently appeared on the palettes of European painters such as Anton Raphael Mengs, Francisco Goya, Jacques-Louis-David, Jean-Auguste-Dominique Ingres, Eugène Delacroix, and Paul Cézanne. The earliest occurrence of Naples yellow in European art is Matthias Stom's Arrest of Christ.

== See also ==
- List of inorganic pigments

== Literature ==
- Wainwright, I.N.M., Taylor, J.M. and Harley, R.D. Lead Antimonate yellow, in Artists' Pigments. A Handbook of Their History and Characteristics, Vol. 1: Feller, R.L. (Ed.) Oxford University Press 1986, p. 219 – 254
