= Liquid color =

The term liquid color or liquid color concentrate describes to a system consisting of a liquid binder (carrier), dyes or pigments and other additives such as process additives, stabilisers or similar. The liquid colors are mixed into the plastic (raw polymer or recyclat) for coloring or changing the properties.

In general, there are three groups of liquid colors.

- Liquid colors, which are used to color plastic products.
- Liquid additive concentrates that provide specific properties in the end products, such as UV stabilization, flame retardancy, antistatic or anti-blocking.
- Combination liquid colors that contain both colorants and additives.

== History and market relevance ==
So-called liquid colours have been used for colouring plastics since the end of the 1960s / beginning of the 1970s. However, liquid colours are still not used extensively and have a market share of just 7% in Europe compared to 93% for masterbatch colouring. This is different in the US, where the market share of liquid colors is about 40%. This is mainly due to the inadequate dosing technology in the early days and the associated contamination in the production area. As a result, the liquid colorant gained a bad reputation and is still not very popular with processors, although the dosing systems have been adapted to the requirements of users, especially in the last decade, and clean and easy handling is possible.

== Fields of application ==
It is possible to add liquid colors to a variety of thermoplastic and thermoset processing methods, such as

- Film extrusion/ thermoforming sheets
- Foam extrusion
- Blown films
- Profile extrusion
- Injection moulding
- Injection blow moulding
- Sealing compounds
- Plastisol hot dipping process

The products obtained from the processing methods are used in the following areas, for example:

- Packaging industry
- Medical Technology
- Automotive Industry
- furniture industry
- Electronics industry
- Toy industry

== Manufacture ==
Depending on the plastic, the choice of the liquid carrier is decisive due to the processing temperatures, compatibility and the later application. In order to prevent migration of the carrier liquid as far as possible, well-tolerated liquid carriers are used which interact with the polymer.

The typical components are:

- Fatty acid esters or fatty acid ester ethoxylates
- Plasticisers
- Paraffin, mineral and natural oils
- Alkyd oils
- Polyisobutylene
- Polyhydric alcohols or alcohol ethoxylates
- Lubricant
- Antistatics

Different mixtures of the components are also used.

The pigment preparations are produced in batches. For this the formulation components are distributed into a binder previously selected for the respective application and then dispersed. The most optimal breaking up of agglomerates is crucial to ensure a high effectiveness of the colour concentrates and / or functional process additives. Dissolvers, bead mills and roller mills are usually used here. For transparent, thin film applications, particularly well broken down pigments are required. In practice, particle sizes < 5 μm have proven successful for film applications.

== Dosing technology ==
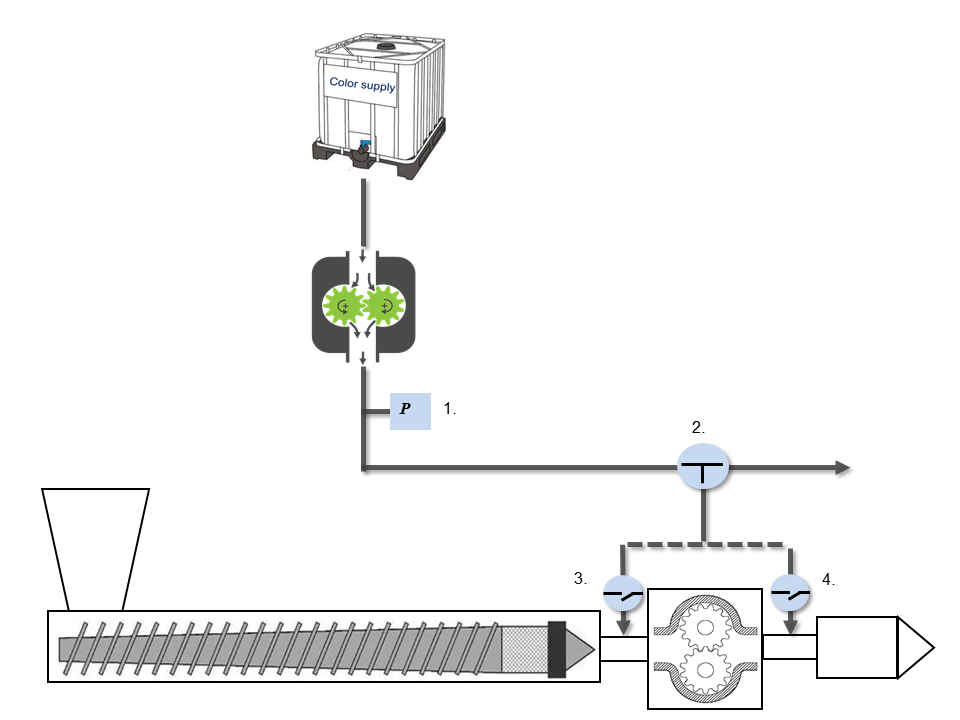
Dosing of liquid color into the melt of an extruder by using a gear pump

The liquid colours can be dosed in different ways. The simplest possibility is to use a so-called drum. Here the polymer granulate is wetted with the liquid color, homogenized in a mixing device and usually processed further. In large-scale applications, aggregates such as peristaltic pumps, Progressive Cavity Pumps or gear pumps are usually used. Here, the dosing can take place above the hopper or directly into the melt.

== Advantages and Disadvantages ==
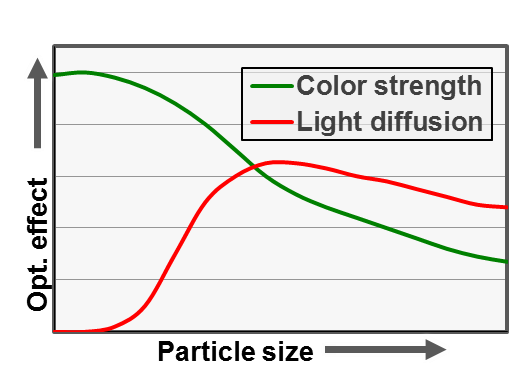
Positive effect of colour intensity and light scattering of liquid colour

=== Advantages ===
Due to batch production, the pigments can be broken down in the liquid carrier medium until they are optimally dispersed. The particles are therefore very finely distributed, which has a positive effect on color intensity and light scattering.

Each batch can be controlled in terms of colour, viscosity and particle size distribution and, if necessary, corrected as a whole.

If the liquid colorant is added to the main hopper together with the raw polymer, the distribution of the liquid colorant is statistically better than that of masterbatch even before melting. Without additional mixing units, a homogeneous, streak-free coloration can be achieved with highly concentrated liquid color from 0.5% dosage.

Due to the wetting with liquid carrier, the pigments adhere less strongly to the metal components of the processing machines, which results in sometimes significantly reduced color change times. Especially when using hot runner systems, the number of cleaning cycles can be reduced. In addition, it is possible to inject the liquid colorant downstream into the plastic melt with appropriate dosing technology. This means that only part of the production line has to be flushed when changing colors, which saves a considerable amount of material and time.

The production of the liquid colours takes place at room temperature. A maximum of 40 °C is achieved by shearing. This means that heat-sensitive pigments such as fluorescent or daylight pigments are not thermally damaged. Defect patterns such as black specks and streaks are reduced and rejects are minimized.

Liquid colors do not have to be pre-dried, which reduces energy costs and handling effort and also further reduces the thermal preload.

The coloring of bio-based plastics with liquid colors leads to an increase in characteristic values in the notched bar impact test.

=== Disadvantages ===
The disadvantages are the high cleaning effort without using suitable dosing equipment. When dosing in the feed zone, very high colouring concentrations are not possible, since above a certain colour dosing level, overlubrication of the plasticizing screw can occur system-related. This means an excessive liquid film on the plasticizing screw, which hinders the uniform conveying of the polymer granulate. The maximum color dosage depends heavily on the polymer used (particle size, surface finish and surface energy), the machine configurations and the pigment load of the liquid color. This can cause problems with very thin-walled parts that must be colored as opaque as possible, or even prevent coloring with liquid color altogether.

If the liquid colorants are not sufficiently stabilized, the colorants may settle. This can lead to uncontrolled flocculation, i.e. pigment particles are in direct contact with each other and can only be separated from each other by high shear forces. When suitable additives are used, pigment particles are connected to a network via additive molecules. Thus there is no direct pigment-pigment contact. Such flocculates can be destroyed by low shear forces, such as manual stirring.

== See also ==
- Dispersion
- Plastic colorant
- Masterbatch
- Plastic
- Injection molding
- Extrusion
- Solid additive
- Surfactant
