= Plastic colorant =

Chemical compounds used to color plastic

Plastic colorants are chemical compounds used to color plastic. Those compounds come in a form of dyes and pigments. The type of a colorant is chosen based on the type of a polymeric resin, that needs to be colored. Dyes are usually used with polycarbonates, polystyrene and acrylic polymers. Pigments are better suited for use with polyolefins.

The colorant must satisfy various constraints, for example, the compound must be chemically compatible with the base resin, be a suitable match with a color standard (see e.g. International Color Consortium), be chemically stable, which in this case means being able to survive the stresses and processing temperature (heat stability) in the fabrication process and be durable enough to match the life duration of the product.

The parameters of the compound vary with a desired effect, which may include the final product being pearlescent, metallic, fluorescent, phosphorescent, thermochromic or photochromic.

The exact chemical formula will furthermore depend on the type of application: general purpose, food contact item, toy, package subject to CONEG, etc.

Different methods for delivering colorants in molding plastics include masterbatches (concentrates), a method which involves a concentrate being separated into resin, cube blends ("salt & pepper mixes" - dry blending) which are natural polymers, already sprayed into natural polymers, surface coating, and precolored resins, which involve using precolored materials to make manufacturing cheaper.

== Examples ==
Colorant	Chemical class	Type
Diarylide pigment	azo dye	pigment
Sudan stain	azo dye	dye
Oil Blue A	anthraquinone	dye
Disperse Red 11	anthraquinone	dye

== See also ==
- Liquid color
- Fuel dyes
