= Pigment =

Powder used to add or alter colour

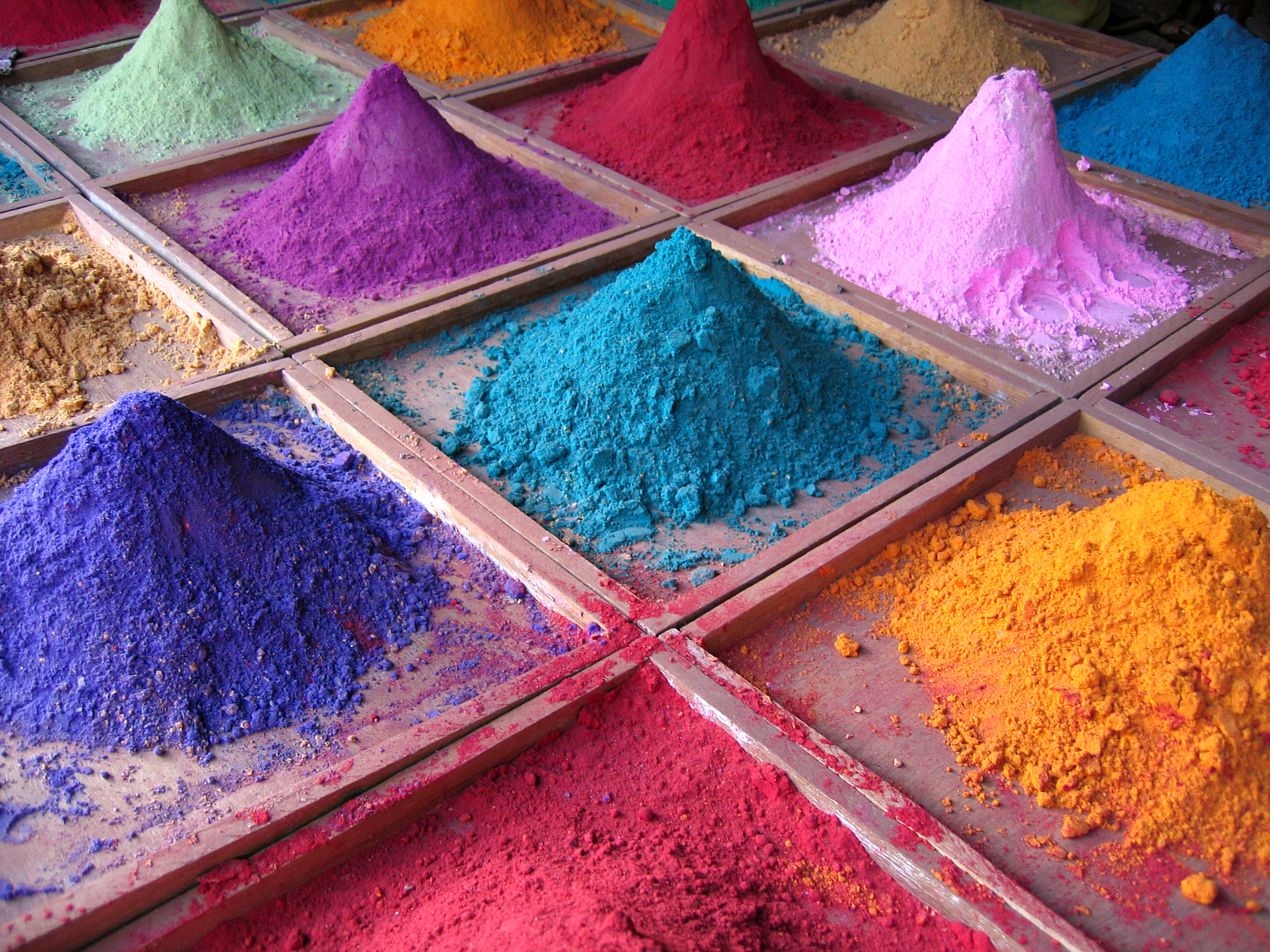
Pigments for sale at a market stall in Goa, India

A pigment is a chemical compound that gives a substance or organism color, or is used by humans to add or alter color or change visual appearance. Pigments are nearly or completely insoluble and chemically unreactive in water or another medium; in contrast, dyes are colored substances which are soluble or go into solution at some stage in their use. Dyes are often organic compounds whereas pigments are often inorganic. Pigments of prehistoric and historic value include ochre, charcoal, and lapis lazuli. Biological pigments are compounds produced by living organisms that provide coloration.

== Economic impact ==
In 2006, around 7.4 million tons of inorganic, organic, and special pigments were marketed worldwide. According to an April 2018 report by Bloomberg Businessweek, the estimated value of the pigment industry globally is $30 billion. The value of titanium dioxide – used to enhance the white brightness of many products – was placed at $13.2 billion per year, while the color Ferrari red is valued at $300 million each year. For organic pigments, the major application is printing inks followed by paints and coloring plastics and textiles.

== Physical principles ==
A wide variety of wavelengths (colors) encounter a pigment. This pigment absorbs red and green light, but reflects blue—giving the substance a blue-colored appearance.

Like all materials, the color of pigments arises because they absorb only certain wavelengths of visible light. The bonding properties of the material determine the wavelength and efficiency of light absorption. Light of other wavelengths are reflected or scattered. The reflected light spectrum defines the color that we observe.

The appearance of pigments is sensitive to the source light. Sunlight has a high color temperature and a fairly uniform spectrum. Sunlight is considered a standard for white light. Artificial light sources are less uniform.

Color spaces used to represent colors numerically must specify their light source. Lab color measurements, unless otherwise noted, assume that the measurement was recorded under a D65 light source, or "Daylight 6500 K", which is roughly the color temperature of sunlight.

Sunlight encounters Rosco R80 "Primary Blue" pigment. The product of the source spectrum and the reflectance spectrum of the pigment results in the final spectrum, and the appearance of blue.

Other properties of a color, such as its saturation or lightness, may be determined by the other substances that accompany pigments. Binders and fillers can affect the color.

== History ==
Minerals have been used as colorants since prehistoric times. Early humans used paint for aesthetic purposes such as body decoration. Pigments and paint grinding equipment believed to be between 350,000 and 400,000 years old have been reported in a cave at Twin Rivers, near Lusaka, Zambia. Ochre, iron oxide, was the first color of paint. A favored blue pigment was derived from lapis lazuli. Pigments based on minerals and clays often bear the name of the city or region where they were originally mined. Raw sienna and burnt sienna came from Siena, Italy, while raw umber and burnt umber came from Umbria. These pigments were among the easiest to synthesize, and chemists created modern colors based on the originals. These were more consistent than colors mined from the original ore bodies, but the place names remained. Also found in many Paleolithic and Neolithic cave paintings are Red Ochre, anhydrous Fe_{2}O_{3}, and the hydrated Yellow Ochre (Fe_{2}O_{3}^{.}H_{2}O). Charcoal—or carbon black—has also been used as a black pigment since prehistoric times.

The first known synthetic pigment was Egyptian blue, which is first attested on an alabaster bowl in Egypt dated to Naqada III (circa 3250 BC). Egyptian blue (blue frit), is calcium copper silicate CaCuSi_{4}O_{10}, made by heating a mixture of quartz sand, lime, a flux and a copper source, such as malachite. Already invented in the Predynastic Period of Egypt, its use became widespread by the 4th Dynasty. It was the blue pigment par excellence of Roman antiquity; its art technological traces vanished in the course of the Middle Ages until its rediscovery in the context of the Egyptian campaign and the excavations in Pompeii and Herculaneum. Later premodern synthetic pigments include white lead (basic lead carbonate, (PbCO_{3})_{2}Pb(OH)_{2}), vermilion, verdigris, and lead-tin yellow. Vermilion, a mercury sulfide, was originally made by grinding a powder of natural cinnabar. From the 17th century on, it was also synthesized from the elements. It was favored by old masters such as Titian. Indian yellow was once produced by collecting the urine of cattle that had been fed only mango leaves. Dutch and Flemish painters of the 17th and 18th centuries favored it for its luminescent qualities, and often used it to represent sunlight. Since mango leaves are nutritionally inadequate for cattle, the practice of harvesting Indian yellow was eventually declared to be inhumane. Modern hues of Indian yellow are made from synthetic pigments. Vermillion has been partially replaced in by cadmium reds.

Because of the cost of lapis lazuli, substitutes were often used. Prussian blue, the oldest modern synthetic pigment, was discovered by accident in 1704. By the early 19th century, synthetic and metallic blue pigments included French ultramarine, a synthetic form of lapis lazuli. Ultramarine was manufactured by treating aluminium silicate with sulfur. Various forms of cobalt blue and Cerulean blue were also introduced. In the early 20th century, Phthalo Blue, a synthetic metallo-organic pigment was prepared. At the same time, Royal Blue, another name once given to tints produced from lapis lazuli, has evolved to signify a much lighter and brighter color, and is usually mixed from Phthalo Blue and titanium dioxide, or from inexpensive synthetic blue dyes.

The discovery in 1856 of mauveine, the first aniline dyes, was a forerunner for the development of hundreds of synthetic dyes and pigments like azo and diazo compounds. These dyes ushered in the flourishing of organic chemistry, including systematic designs of colorants. The development of organic chemistry diminished the dependence on inorganic pigments.

Paintings illustrating advances in pigments

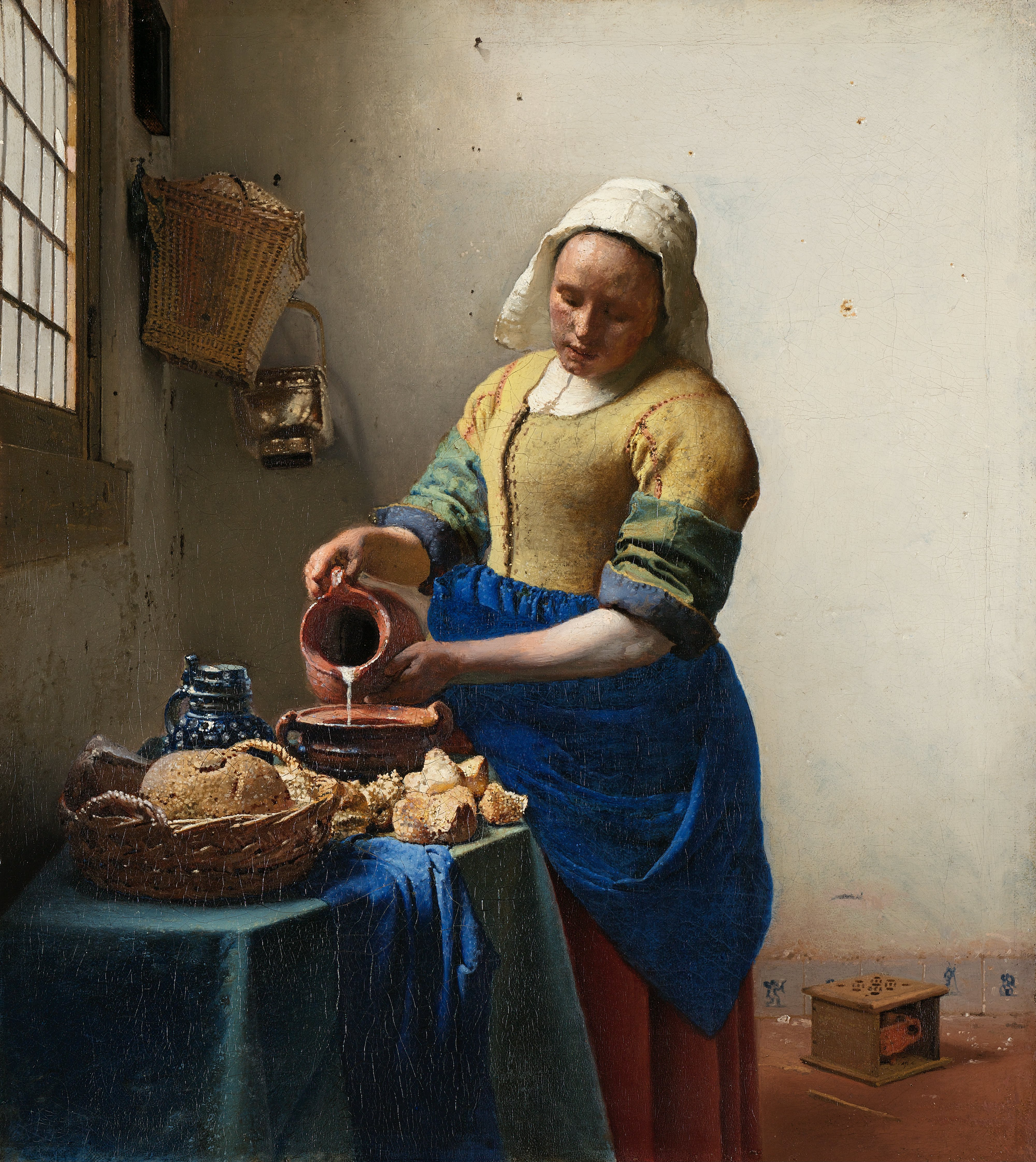
The Milkmaid by Johannes Vermeer (c. 1658). Vermeer was lavish in his choice of expensive pigments, including lead-tin yellow, natural ultramarine, and madder lake, as shown in the vibrant painting.

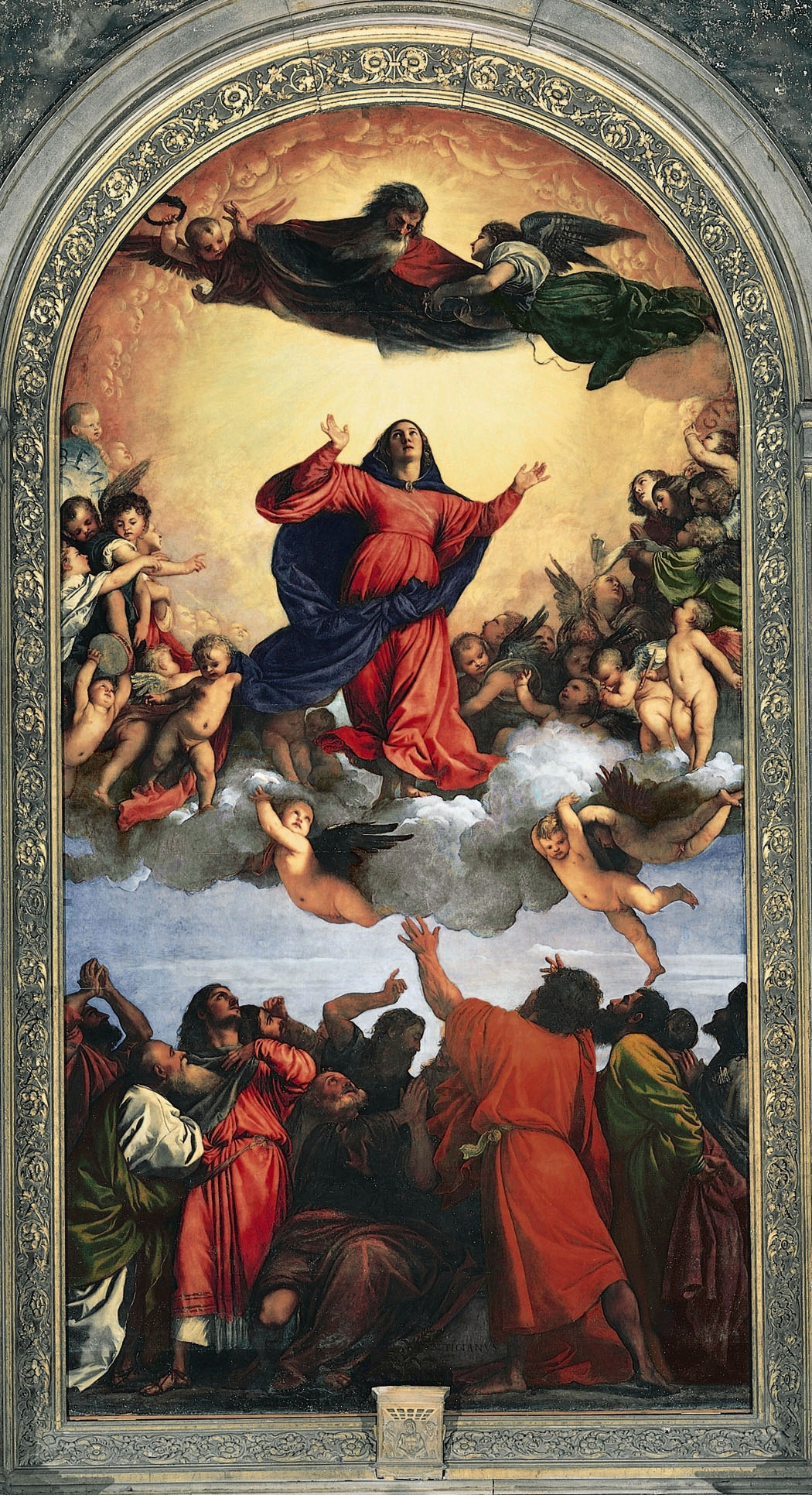
Titian used the historic pigment vermilion to create the reds in the oil painting of Assunta, completed c. 1518.

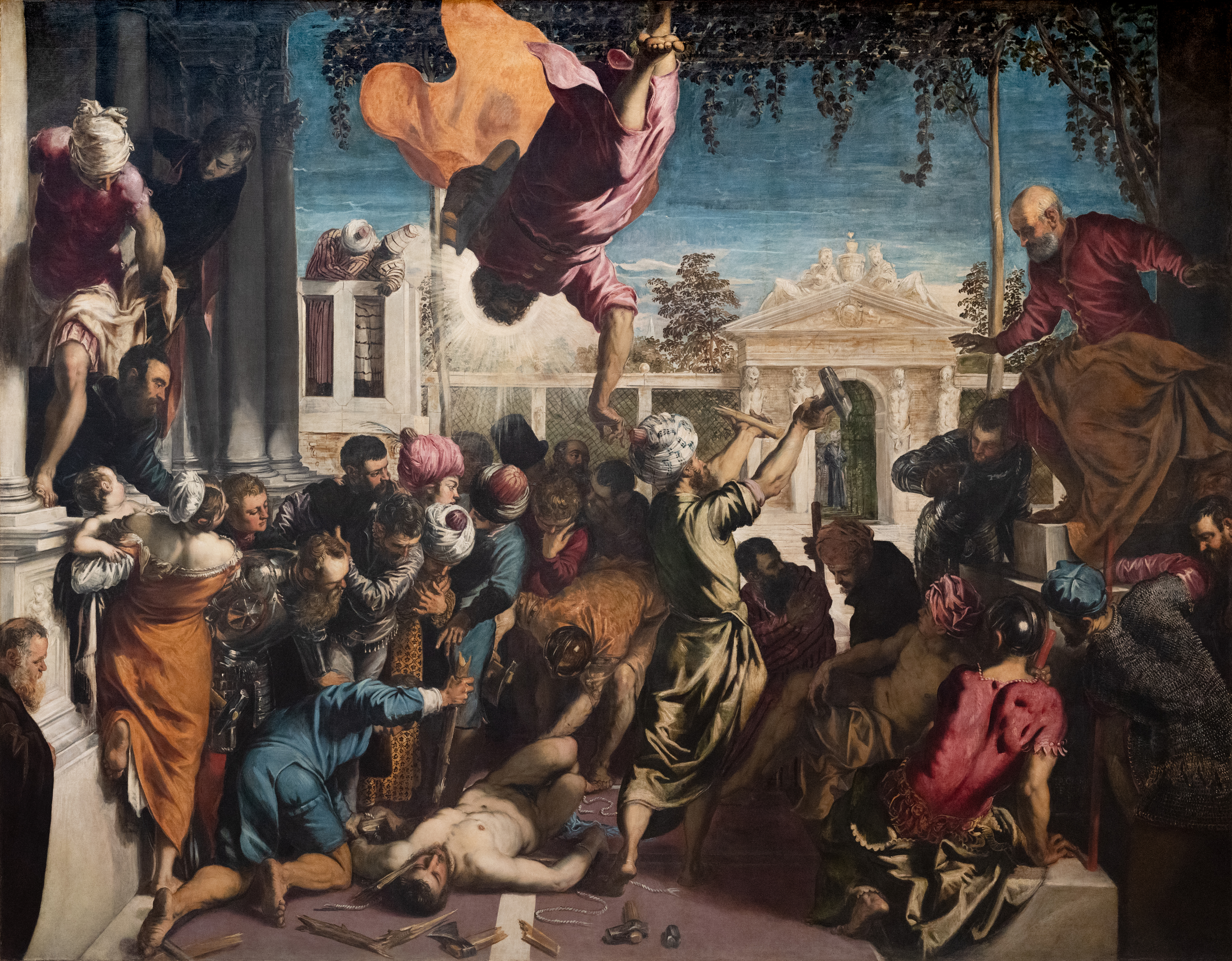
Miracle of the Slave by Tintoretto (c. 1548). The son of a master dyer, Tintoretto used Carmine Red Lake pigment, derived from the cochineal insect, to achieve dramatic color effects.

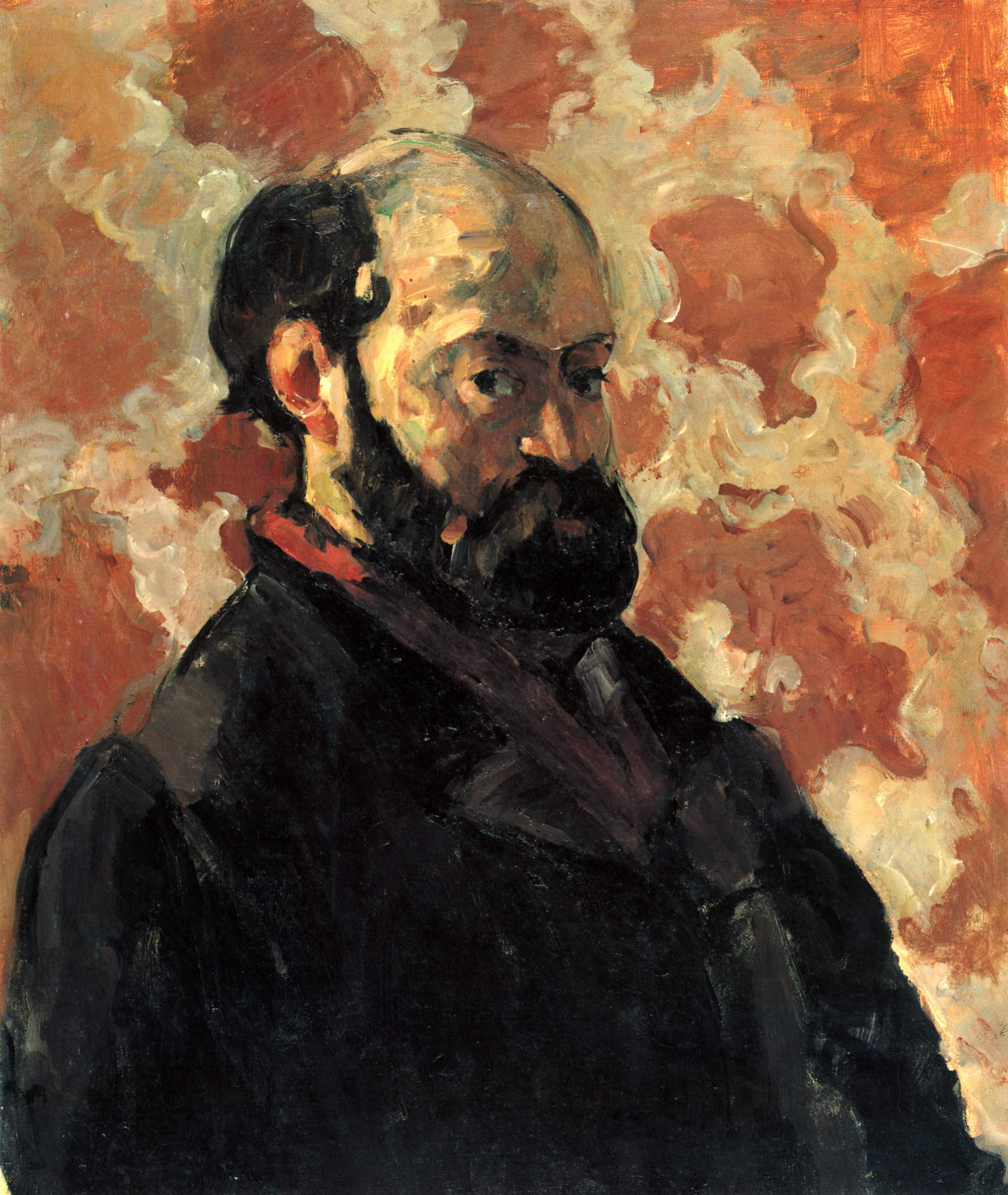
Self Portrait by Paul Cézanne. Working in the late 19th century, Cézanne had a much broader palette of colors than his predecessors.

== Manufacturing and industrial standards ==
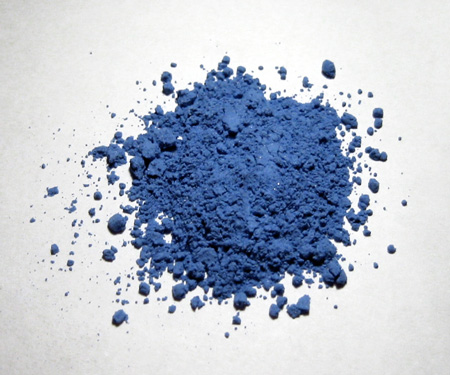
Natural ultramarine pigment in powdered form

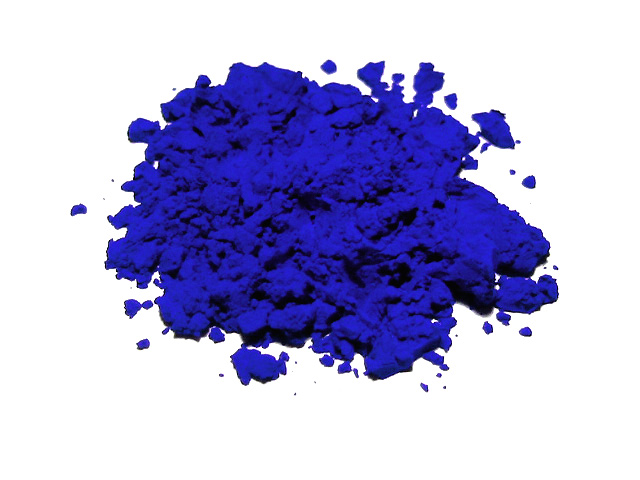
Synthetic ultramarine pigment is chemically identical to natural ultramarine

Before the development of synthetic pigments, and the refinement of techniques for extracting mineral pigments, batches of color were often inconsistent. With the development of a modern color industry, manufacturers and professionals have cooperated to create international standards for identifying, producing, measuring, and testing colors.

First published in 1905, the Munsell color system became the foundation for a series of color models, providing objective methods for the measurement of color. The Munsell system describes a color in three dimensions, hue, value (lightness), and chroma (color purity), where chroma is the difference from gray at a given hue and value.

By the middle 20th century, standardized methods for pigment chemistry were available, part of an international movement to create such standards in industry. The International Organization for Standardization (ISO) develops technical standards for the manufacture of pigments and dyes. ISO standards define various industrial and chemical properties, and how to test for them. The principal ISO standards that relate to all pigments are as follows:

- ISO-787 General methods of test for pigments and extenders.
- ISO-8780 Methods of dispersion for assessment of dispersion characteristics.

Other ISO standards pertain to particular classes or categories of pigments, based on their chemical composition, such as ultramarine pigments, titanium dioxide, iron oxide pigments, and so forth.

Many manufacturers of paints, inks, textiles, plastics, and colors have voluntarily adopted the Colour Index International (CII) as a standard for identifying the pigments that they use in manufacturing particular colors. First published in 1925—and now published jointly on the web by the Society of Dyers and Colourists (United Kingdom) and the American Association of Textile Chemists and Colorists (US)—this index is recognized internationally as the authoritative reference on colorants. It encompasses more than 27,000 products under more than 13,000 generic color index names.

In the CII schema, each pigment has a generic index number that identifies it chemically, regardless of proprietary and historic names. For example, Phthalocyanine Blue BN has been known by a variety of generic and proprietary names since its discovery in the 1930s. In much of Europe, phthalocyanine blue is better known as Helio Blue, or by a proprietary name such as Winsor Blue. An American paint manufacturer, Grumbacher, registered an alternate spelling (Thanos Blue) as a trademark. Colour Index International resolves all these conflicting historic, generic, and proprietary names so that manufacturers and consumers can identify the pigment (or dye) used in a particular color product. In the CII, all phthalocyanine blue pigments are designated by a generic color index number as either PB15 or PB16, short for pigment blue 15 and pigment blue 16; these two numbers reflect slight variations in molecular structure, which produce a slightly more greenish or reddish blue.

=== Processing ===
Samples of pigments used in ancient Greek painting, display at the Acropolis Museum, Athens

Pigments are typically produced as primary particles. These primary particles may fuse across their surfaces to form aggregates. The term agglomerates refers to primary particles and/or aggregates joined at their corners or edges. During the dispersion process, these pigment agglomerates are fractured as the pigments are incorporated into an application medium, resulting in smaller agglomerates, aggregates, and primary particles. Once formed, these are wetted by a dispersing medium and, ideally, achieve a uniform statistical distribution throughout the application medium.

In solid form, pigments can be used in their pure state (primary pigment), as a solid blend of two or more pigments, or as a mixture with one or more fillers. Mixing with fillers reduces color strength, allowing for more precise dosing of small quantities—a practice commonly employed in powder coatings. Due to spatial proximity, primary pigments exhibit enhanced intensity (simultaneous contrast).

For liquid coatings, pre-dispersed pigment preparations—which may be binder-based or binder-free—are frequently used. These preparations are formulated similarly to the coating itself; they are pre-dispersed and contain high pigment concentrations within additives, solvents, water, or binders, depending on the application. The primary advantage of pigment preparations lies in their simple and precise incorporation, as the pigment is already dispersed and standardized. However, certain additives may be disadvantageous if the preparation is incompatible with specific coating systems.

A tinting system consists of a combination of several (typically 12–20) pigment preparations, an automatic dosing system, and formulation software. This method is standard for emulsion paint. Pigment preparations may exist as mixtures with other pigments or fillers. In addition to common liquid preparations, granulated versions made with highly soluble binders are available for applications where additional solvents are undesirable in the paint formulation.

A third option, prevalent in the plastics industry, involves the use of solid or liquid pigment preparations known as masterbatches or liquid colorants. During masterbatch production, pigments are extruded or kneaded into a binder matrix at elevated processing temperatures. Upon cooling, the solid masterbatches are typically granulated to ensure precise and reproducible color shades when incorporated into plastic. Depending on the desired effect, masterbatches may contain various pigments or fillers. Liquid pigment preparations are produced in batches at room temperature; formulation components are distributed into a pre-selected binder and subsequently dispersed. It is critical that agglomerates are optimally broken down to ensure that the color concentrates and functional process additives remain highly effective. Dissolvers, agitator bead mills and roller mills are typically utilized for this purpose.

== Figures of merit ==
The following are some of the attributes of pigments that determine their suitability for particular manufacturing processes and applications:

- Lightfastness and sensitivity for damage from ultraviolet light
- Heat stability
- Toxicity
- Tinting strength
- Staining
- Dispersion (which can be measured with a Hegman gauge)
- Opacity or transparency
- Resistance to alkalis and acids
- Reactions and interactions between pigments

== Swatches ==
Swatches are used to communicate colors accurately. The types of swatches are dictated by the media, i.e., printing, computers, plastics, and textiles. Generally, the medium that offers the broadest gamut of color shades is widely used across diverse media.

=== Printed swatches ===
Reference standards are provided by printed swatches of color shades. PANTONE, RAL, Munsell, etc. are widely used standards of color communication across diverse media like printing, plastics, and textiles.

=== Plastic swatches ===
Companies manufacturing color masterbatches and pigments for plastics offer plastic swatches in injection molded color chips. These color chips are supplied to the designer or customer to choose and select the color for their specific plastic products.

Plastic swatches are available in various special effects like pearl, metallic, fluorescent, sparkle, mosaic etc. However, these effects are difficult to replicate on other media like print and computer display. Plastic swatches have been created by 3D modelling to including various special effects.

=== Computer swatches ===
The appearance of pigments in natural light is difficult to replicate on a computer display. Approximations are required. The Munsell Color System provides an objective measure of color in three dimensions: hue, value (or lightness), and chroma. Computer displays in general fail to show the true chroma of many pigments, but the hue and lightness can be reproduced with relative accuracy. However, when the gamma of a computer display deviates from the reference value, the hue is also systematically biased.

The following approximations assume a display device at gamma 2.2, using the sRGB color space. The further a display device deviates from these standards, the less accurate these swatches will be. Swatches are based on the average measurements of several lots of single-pigment watercolor paints, converted from Lab color space to sRGB color space for viewing on a computer display. The appearance of a pigment may depend on the brand and even the batch. Furthermore, pigments have inherently complex reflectance spectra that will render their color appearance greatly different depending on the spectrum of the source illumination, a property called metamerism. Averaged measurements of pigment samples will only yield approximations of their true appearance under a specific source of illumination. Computer display systems use a technique called chromatic adaptation transforms to emulate the correlated color temperature of illumination sources, and cannot perfectly reproduce the intricate spectral combinations originally seen. In many cases, the perceived color of a pigment falls outside of the gamut of computer displays and a method called gamut mapping is used to approximate the true appearance. Gamut mapping trades off any one of lightness, hue, or saturation accuracy to render the color on screen, depending on the priority chosen in the conversion's ICC rendering intent.

#990024 Tyrian red	PR106 – #E34234 Vermilion (genuine)	#FFB02E Indian yellow

PB29 – #003BAF Ultramarine blue	PB27 – #0B3E66 Prussian blue

== Plastic colorants ==
The use of pigments with polymers has been of interest in applications such as giving plastic different colors for appearance, marketability, and practicality purposes. Major challenges when choosing a color to be used in plastics are issues such as environmental issues from production, safety in production and handling, toxicity and ecotoxicity of the final product, traces of harmful chemicals in the product, environmental fate of the product when disposed, use of heavy metals and dichlorobenzidine in the pigment, distortion of the pigment, disposal of pigment, and ability to recycle. Thus, the requirements of colorants for plastics are ease of use, physical and chemical inertness, compatibility with additives, satisfactory performance with intended use, nontoxicity, and environmental impact.

== Pigments by chemical composition ==
Pigments, at least for commercial use, are often classified as inorganic vs organic. Traditional pigments are inorganic, often oxides and sulfides of transition metals. They are intrinsically insoluble owing to their polymeric structure, which feature M-O-M and M-S-M linkages.

=== Inorganic pigments ===
For those inorganic pigments containing metal ions, these materials are often classified according to that metal.

- Barium: barium white (lithopone)
- Cadmium pigments: cadmium yellow, cadmium red, cadmium green, cadmium orange, cadmium sulfoselenide
- Carbon pigments: carbon black (including vine black, lamp black), ivory black (bone charcoal)
- Chromium pigments: chrome yellow and chrome green (viridian)
- Cobalt pigments: cobalt violet, cobalt blue, cerulean blue, aureolin (cobalt yellow)
- Copper pigments: Han purple, Han blue, Paris green
- Iron oxide pigments: oxide red, Venetian red, Prussian blue, raw sienna, burnt sienna, raw umber, burnt umber
- Lead pigments: lead white, Naples yellow, red lead, lead-tin yellow
- Manganese pigments: manganese violet, YInMn blue, manganese oxide brown or black
- Mercury pigments: vermilion
- Sulfur pigments: ultramarine, ultramarine green shade, lapis lazuli
- Titanium pigments: titanium yellow, titanium white, titanium black
- Zinc pigments: zinc white, zinc ferrite, zinc yellow

Aluminum powder is sometimes considered as a pigment, conferring a metallic sheen.

Some traditional pigments are of no present day significance, for example the copper-oxide/hydroxide materials malachite, verdigris, and azurite are unstable. Caput mortuum is obscure. sanguine, an iron oxide-containing red chalk, is used in artwork. Red ochre and yellow ochre, also iron-based, are of no commercial value. Egyptian blue was used during Roman times.

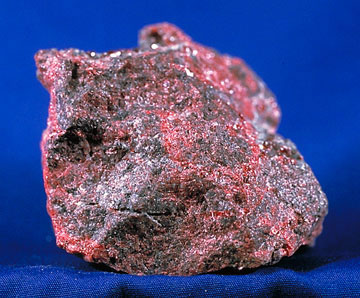
Cinnabar, mineral - a raw material for the cinnabar-colored red pigment mercury sulfide

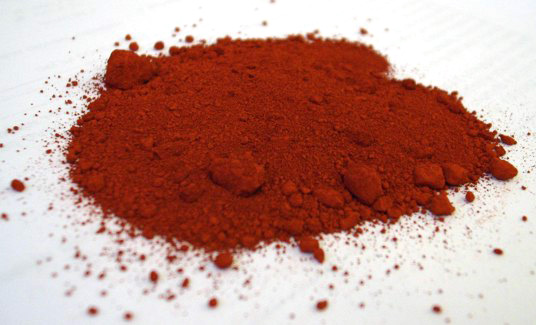
Iron oxide red, yellowish variant

==== Classification into natural and synthetically produced pigments ====
Inorganic pigments are distinguished by their origin: natural or synthetic. The first group comprises earths and minerals (earth colors, white minerals) that require minimal or purely mechanical processing, such as drying and grinding. The second group consists of synthetic inorganic pigments—such as metal effect pigments, carbon black, white pigments, iron oxide pigments, and zirconium silicates—which are products of various industrial manufacturing processes. Synthetic inorganic pigments are preferred industrially due to their superior purity and consistent quality.

A definitive classification or determination of natural versus artificial origin is not always required. For instance, such subdivisions are applied to iron oxide layers in prehistoric paintings. However, identifying a substance as cinnabarite (the red modification of mercury sulphide) does not inherently confirm a natural origin. Furthermore, in antiquity, "cinnabar" was often used as a synonym for any red pigment and was frequently synonymous with minium. The formal subdivision of inorganic pigments into natural and artificial categories only emerged in the 1940s and does not reflect chemical structure.

==== Classification according to chemical classes ====
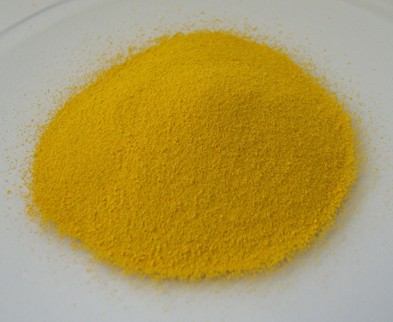
Bismutvanadat

Chemically, the most significant industrial pigments are divided into eight substance classes: titanium dioxide, carbon black, bismuth vanadate, metal oxides and hydroxides, Berlin blue, ultramarine, cadmium pigments, and chromates.

The oxides and hydroxides group is further categorized into iron oxide pigments, chromium oxides, and mixed phase oxide pigments such as Rinman's green (the latter includes subgroups such as spinel pigments, hematite pigments, inverse spinel pigments, and rutile derivatives). The chromate pigment group is subdivided into lead chromate, chromium green, and molybdate.

Carbon black occupies a unique position; while chemically inorganic by definition, it is often classified as an organic pigment in practice due to its fine particle size and the resulting application properties.

==== Properties ====
Most inorganic pigments are characterized by their chemical inertness toward atmospheric oxygen, making them exceptionally resistant to aging. They retain their color indefinitely, though the appearance may be affected by the degradation of organic binding media, such as oil, over time.

Their high thermal stability makes them indispensable for porcelain painting, as organic pigments cannot withstand the high temperatures of the firing process. In industrial applications, this heat resistance is vital for plastic coloration, powder coatings, and coil coatings—though heat-resistant organic pigments may be used in processes with lower temperature requirements.

Certain traditional pigments, such as cadmium sulphide, lead chromate, and molybdate red, are rarely used in modern contexts (particularly in Europe) due to the health risks associated with their heavy metals content.

The hues of inorganic pigments are often described as muted or "cloudy" compared to their organic counterparts. While this applies generally to pigments like iron oxide pigments or chromium oxide green, some inorganic pigments exhibit pure, brilliant hues. Industrially significant examples include bismuth vanadate, as well as the restricted pigments cadmium sulphide, lead chromate, and molybdate red, which provide high brilliance and excellent hiding power. Other notable examples include zaffer and ultramarine.

==== Industrial use ====
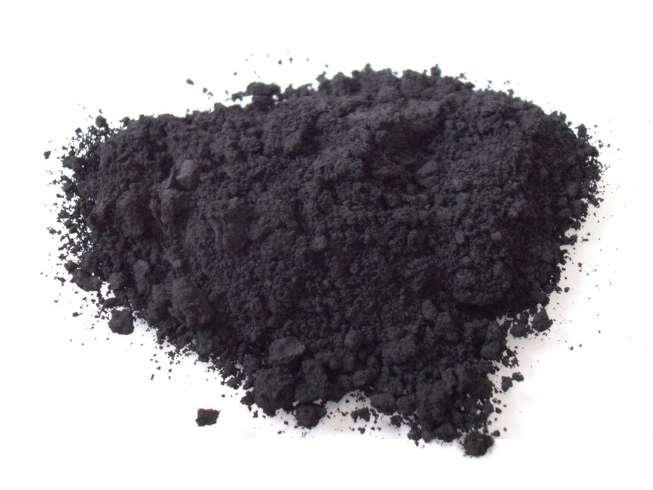
pigment carbon black

White pigments occupy a unique position due to their immense industrial scale and distribution. In the European paper industry alone, over 10 million tons are consumed annually, with white minerals—primarily calcium carbonate—representing the largest share.

In the coatings sector, white is of primary importance. In emulsion paints, it serves as the base color for tinting systems and remains the most prevalent shade. In terms of both value and production volume, titanium dioxide is the dominant pigment, accounting for approximately 60% of the total market. Global consumption of titanium dioxide reached nearly 4.5 million tons in 2006. Titanium white rose to prominence in the 1960s, displacing lead white due to its superior fastness properties and a general increase in demand within industrialized nations. Accessible iron oxide pigments rank second in global production, accounting for 22% by volume and 8% by value, followed by carbon black at 4% by volume and 9% by value. While the remaining inorganic and organic pigments account for the rest of the volume, their significantly higher price points mean they represent nearly 30% of the market by value.

Among the other inorganic pigments, chromium(III) oxide, ultramarine, bismuth vanadate, zirconium silicates, and mixed-phase oxide pigments are particularly important. Due to its refractive index, calcium carbonate is primarily utilized in the coatings industry as a filler rather than a pigment.

=== Organic pigments ===
Chemical structure of Phthalo Blue

Organic pigments are usually derived from petrochemicals. They feature extended conjugated double bonds, often aromatic rings. They owe their low solubility to intermolecular forces such as hydrogen bonds and pi-pi interactions. The most important organic pigments from the economic perspective are the phthalocyanines, e.g. phthalo blue, but the most numerous are azo-based pigments.

- quinacridone
- Phthalocyanine Blue BN, Phthalocyanine Green G,
- diarylides
- azo dyes
- anthraquinones
- indigo

==== Natural organic pigments ====
Organic pigments occur naturally as animal- or plant-derived colorants. Some of these pigments are easily produced; for instance, vine black consists of partially carbonized vine wood. Several historically significant pigments, such as the vibrant Indian yellow derived from the urine of cows, have lost their prominence due to the vast range of available synthetic pigments. The soluble, nearly colorless leuco form of indigo (leucoindigo or indigo white) is converted into the insoluble pigment indigo through oxidation by atmospheric oxygen.

==== Synthetic organic pigments ====
Synthetic organic pigments are classified according to their chemical structure. The most diverse and extensive group comprises the azo pigments, which account for over 50% of organic pigments sold. The remaining group is categorized as polycyclic pigments or, colloquially, non-azo pigments.

===== Azo pigments =====
Azo pigments are compounds whose properties as chromophores result primarily from the delocalization of electrons originating from an azo group (-N=N-). Consequently, all azo pigments contain at least one azo group. These pigments are further subdivided into classes where the chemical structure provides a broad indication of color fastness. The actual fastness is determined by the specific substituents and the particle size. A distinction is made between monoazo and disazo pigments based on the number of azo linkages present, with further classification based on their respective substituents.

Monoazo pigments include simple varieties such as β-naphthol pigments, naphthol AS pigments, and laked azo dyes. This group includes some of the most widely used organic pigments and represents the oldest industrially available category. Examples include the arylid yellow pigments C.I. Pigment Yellow 1, 3, and 74, C.I. Pigment Orange 5, and C.I. Pigment Red 112.

A notable subclass is the benzimidazolone pigments. These are monoazo pigments containing polycyclic substituents, which impart exceptional weather fastness, allowing them to achieve the highest fastness levels within the azo pigment category. Examples include C.I. Pigment Yellow 154 and C.I. Pigment Orange 36. Disazo pigments include diaryl yellow pigments (C.I. Pigment Yellow 83), disazo condensation pigments (C.I. Pigment Yellow 128), and acetoacetic acid anilide pigments (C.I. Pigment Yellow 155). Azo-metal complex pigments represent a special case, as they do not strictly contain a true azo group.

Laked pigments—originally soluble dyes converted into insoluble salts with metals—are utilized in textile dyeing. "Laking" refers to the process by which soluble dyes are fixed onto a fiber as coloring agents through reaction with metal salts or tannins.

===== Polycyclic pigments =====
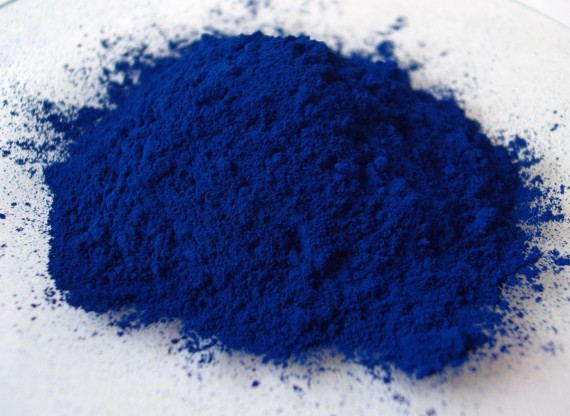
copper phthalocyanine, a polycyclic blue pigment

Polycyclic pigments are compounds where the chromophore property is generated by electron delocalization across an extended ring system.

Copper phthalocyanine pigments constitute approximately half of all polycyclic pigments and represent the most significant portion of this category. The primary representatives include various types of phthalocyanine blue and halogenated derivatives, such as phthalocyanine green. Other important polycyclic pigment classes include quinacridones, diketopyrrolopyrrole pigments, dioxazine colorants, perylenes, isoindolines, and inthanthrones.

===== Other groups =====
In addition to the two primary groups, various organic pigments exist with unique compositions, often tailored for specialized applications. Due to economic factors or specific fastness requirements, frequently only a single chemical compound within a particular structure is suitable for use as a pigment. This group includes laked dyes which, as heavy metal salts, have lost their solubility and thus function as pigments.

==== Properties ====
Organic pigments generally differ from inorganic pigments by exhibiting higher color strength, lower hiding power, higher chroma (saturation), and lower weather fastness. Furthermore, organic pigments are typically more expensive. They often undergo post-treatment to enhance specific application properties, such as dispersibility or hiding power. This post-treatment also facilitates particle size adjustment, which is critical for determining the fastness level, color strength, and the precise tuning of the coloration.

==== Toxicology ====
Regarding the toxicology of organic pigments, they are generally considered physiologically inert due to their low solubility. Health concerns are primarily associated with their status as particulate matter. Organic pigments are regarded as essentially non-biodegradable. Because pigments are integrated into intermediate or end products alongside dispersants, binders, and solvents, the toxicological effects of these auxiliary substances may also require evaluation.

Degradation products resulting from laser irradiation—such as during the removal of tattoo pigments—can pose toxicological risks. For example, the laser-induced cleavage of the tattoo pigment C.I. Pigment Red 22 (CAS No. 6448-95-9 Q27269269) has been shown to produce the toxic and carcinogenic compound 2-methyl-5-nitroaniline. Similarly, the irradiation of copper phthalocyanine can generate hydrocyanic acid.

=== Delimitation ===
Acid-base indicators are not classified as pigments; they are dyes whose color changes according to the pH of a solution.

Lake pigments consist of a coloring component and a largely colorless substrate. Both components are bound together via a conversion process, rendering them insoluble in water and binders. Historically, plant dyes were applied to white substrates such as chalk or white lead, with mordants like alum and sodium carbonate added to enhance the bond between the dye and the substrate.

=== Biological pigments ===
In biology, a pigment is any colored material of plant or animal cells. Many biological structures, such as skin, eyes, fur, and hair contain pigments (such as melanin). Animal skin coloration often comes about through specialized cells called chromatophores, which animals such as the octopus and chameleon can control to vary the animal's color. Many conditions affect the levels or nature of pigments in plant, animal, some protista, or fungus cells. For instance, the disorder called albinism affects the level of melanin production in animals.

Pigmentation in organisms serves many biological purposes, including camouflage, mimicry, aposematism (warning), sexual selection and other forms of signalling, photosynthesis (in plants), and basic physical purposes such as protection from sunburn.

Pigment color differs from structural color in that pigment color is the same for all viewing angles, whereas structural color is the result of selective reflection or iridescence, usually because of multilayer structures. For example, butterfly wings typically contain structural color, although many butterflies have cells that contain pigment as well.

Some important organic pigments were first obtained from natural sources, either as mixtures or as the purified compound. Almost all of these pigments can be produced more efficiently using the techniques of organic synthesis, which developed rapidly in the 19th Century. Some dramatic examples are indigo and alizarin, where large plantations were shuttered by the methods that started with coal tar (now petroleum).

- alizarin (chromophore in rose madder), now produced synthetically
- indigo, now produced synthetically
- gamboge, of historic interest
- cochineal red, of historic interest
- Indian yellow, now produced synthetically
- Tyrian purple, of historic interest

=== Polymer pigments ===
There has also been interest in making polymers that can be used as pigments. Some modern piments can have compatibility issues with paints. For example, white pigments such as titanium dioxide, calcite, zinc sulfide, and zinc oxide, can have compatibility issues with paints due to being inorganic compounds that can aggregate. Hybrid organic/inorganic pigments of different colors made of polymers and mica have been synthesizes with possible uses in cosmetics and coating applications.

=== Metal effect pigments ===
Brass and aluminum are the primary pigments used to produce a metal effect. Brass particles impart a golden appearance, while aluminum in platelet form creates a silvery effect. Former common designations include silver bronze for aluminum pigments and, depending on the alloy and shade, gold bronze, pale gold, rich pale gold, and rich gold for brass pigments.

The visual impression is angle-dependent. When viewed from a near-vertical angle (face), the brighter metal effect pigment is visible, whereas at a shallow grazing angle, the typically darker base color emerges. This phenomenon, resulting from the platelet-like shape of the particles, is known as flop. Aluminum flakes of an appropriate particle size produce a silver sheen, while spherical particles of the same size result in a uniform gray surface. Since untreated aluminum pigments exhibit limited stability, particularly in aqueous systems or under weathering, surface-treated variants have been developed to mitigate these disadvantages.

Color depth is closely related to grain size. The pigment's exact appearance is determined by particle size and the regularity of its shape. Coarse particles create a glittering effect known as sparkle, while fine particles produce a smoother flop with a softer transition as the viewing angle changes. Both types are frequently used in combination to achieve desired visual effects.

=== Pearlescent pigments ===
Operating principle of an effect pigment with multicolored pearlescence

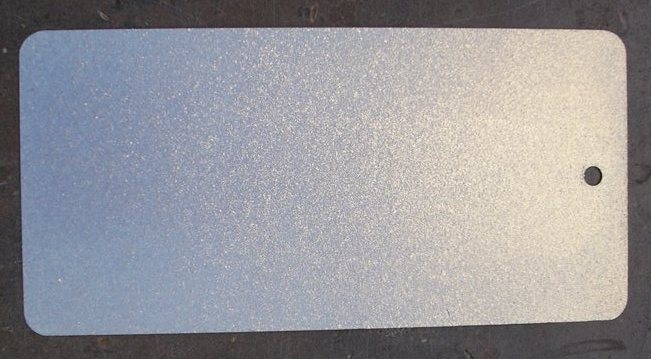
Color flop of an effect coating from blue to gold

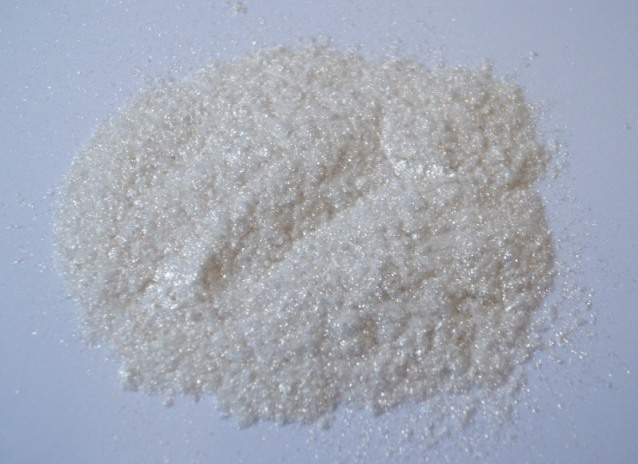
Interference pigment blue-gold

These are classified as interference pigments. They consist of platelet-shaped carrier substrates with a low refractive index—typically natural mica, silicon dioxide, or thin glass platelets—coated with one or more extremely thin, uniform oxide layers possessing a high refractive index. Preferred coating materials include titanium dioxide, iron(III) oxide, or zirconium dioxide, as well as their mixed oxides. Primary coating methods include sol-gel process, chemical vapor deposition (CVD), and physical vapor deposition (PVD). The resulting layer thicknesses are approximately 100 nm. Precise control of the coating thickness (within ±3 nm) and its homogeneity is vital during production.

By selecting specific coating parameters—primarily the refractive index, layer thickness, and layer sequence—nearly any color or shade can be achieved through the interference color effect. Under specific conditions, angle-dependent "color flop" effects can be produced, where the color tone shifts according to the observer's viewing angle.

Certain pearlescent pigments (e.g., bismuth chloride oxide) are non-toxic and are approved by the Food and Drug Administration in the United States for use in food coloring.

=== Luminescent pigments ===
Luminescent pigments include colorful fluorescent pigments used in daylight fluorescent paints ("neon colors") and afterglow paints based on phosphorescence. They are utilized in fluorescent paint. Fluorescent pigments generally consist of fluorescent dyes incorporated into a matrix to impart pigment properties. Inorganic substances doped for phosphorescence serve as afterglow pigments. Green luminescent pigments based on zinc sulphides are widely employed for marking escape routes.

Radioactive illuminants are not classified as pigments, despite being insoluble. These are self-luminous materials where the light emission is triggered by radioactive excitation rather than UV or daylight.

== See also ==
- Blue pigments
- Effect pigment
- Lake pigment
- List of Stone Age art
- Red pigments
- Rock art
- Subtractive color
- Plastic colorants
