= Metal effect pigment =

Pigments used to create an optical metallic effect

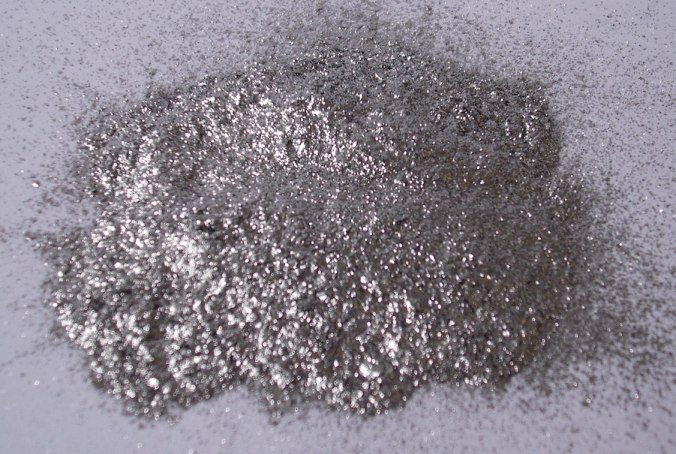
Aluminum pigment as powder

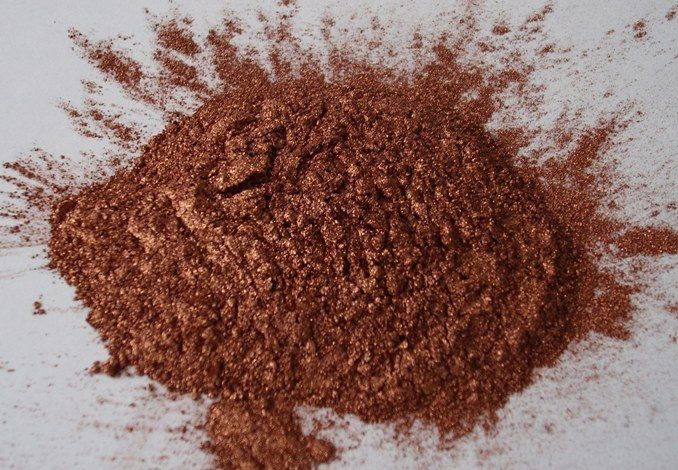
Copper pigment

Metal effect pigments, formerly referred to as bronzes, are pigments used to create an optical metallic effect, commonly also described as a metallic appearance. These pigments typically consist of platelet-shaped particles with particle diameters generally in the two- to three-digit micrometer range, although tetrahedral particle geometries have also been documented, which help prevent inhomogeneities in the metallic effect (flow lines). The optical effect of these effect pigments is based on the alignment of the planar particle surfaces parallel to the surface of the surrounding medium, where directional reflection occurs. Metal effect pigments are listed in the Color Index under C.I. Pigment Metal.

Metal effect pigments are used to achieve gloss effects in printing inks, plastics, cosmetics, and paints (see metallic paint). The most economically important materials are aluminum (C.I. Pigment Metal 1, silver bronze, see alumina effect pigment) and brass (C.I. Pigment Metal 2, gold bronze). According to estimates, the global market for metal effect pigments amounts to 25,000 tons annually.

== History ==
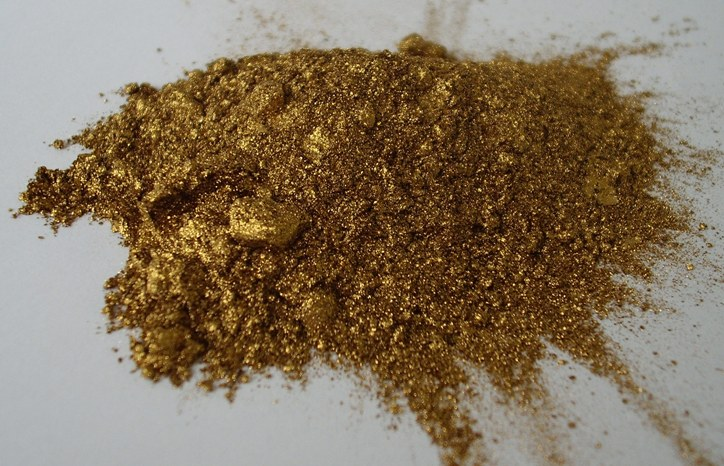
Brass pigment (Reichbleichgold)

Metal effect pigments, alongside pearl luster pigments, are the oldest subgroup of effect pigments. The underlying concept emerged between the fourth and third centuries BC from the gold beater trade in Egypt. Waste generated during the hammering of gold into extremely thin foils was mixed into precursors of modern lacquer systems, imparting a golden appearance. Since the 18th century AD, brass has been used as a substitute for expensive gold. Later, fine aluminum flakes were developed to produce a silver-colored effect.

The first process for the large-scale production of aluminum pigments was developed in 1910 in the United States of America (stamping process). As this involved dry grinding, the risk of explosion was very high; consequently, the process was soon replaced by a wet-grinding method known as the "Hall process," named after its inventor and patent holder. Dry grinding is still commonly used for brass pigments.

== Classification ==
=== Leafing and non-leafing types ===
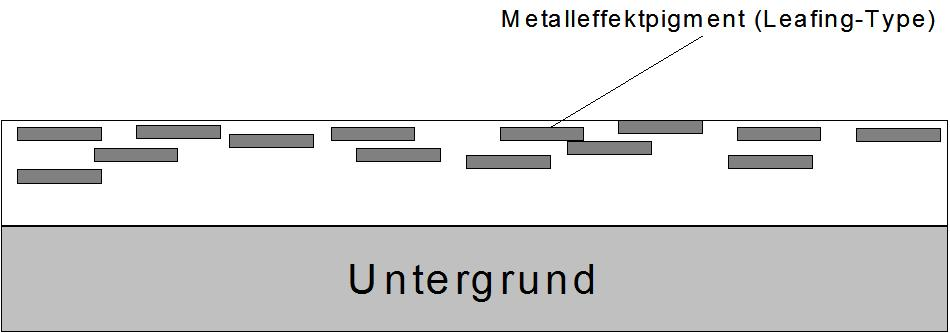
Orientation of leafing pigments in a coating layer

A fundamental distinction is made between leafing and non-leafing pigments. In leafing pigments, the platelets orient themselves at the interface after application within the coating film. This produces a strong metallic gloss effect but results in poor smudge and scratch resistance. Typical applications include printing inks, reflective coatings, and aerosol coatings, where optical performance is the primary consideration. Brass pigments are generally leafing types.

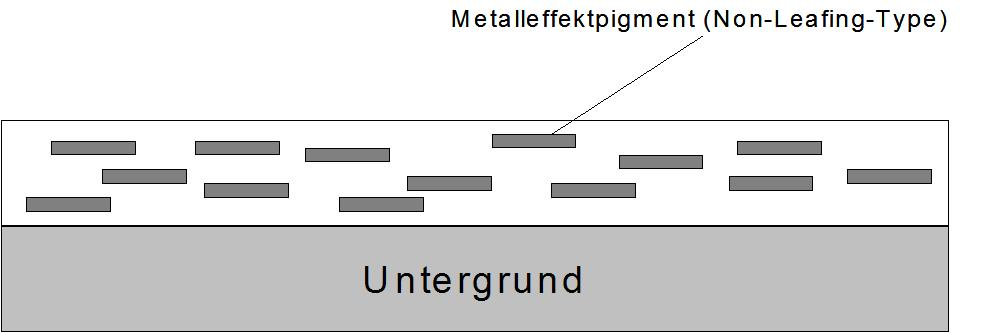
Orientation of non-leafing pigments in a coating layer

Non-leafing pigments are evenly distributed throughout the film matrix after application. This provides protection against abrasion and chemical attack, although the resulting appearance is grayer and less intensely metallic. They can also be combined with colored pigments to produce colored metallic effects. This is only possible with leafing pigments at low concentrations, as their accumulation at the paint surface otherwise obscures the uniformly distributed colored pigments. The main applications of non-leafing pigments include automotive coatings, coatings for cell phones and electrical components, and industrial coatings in general.

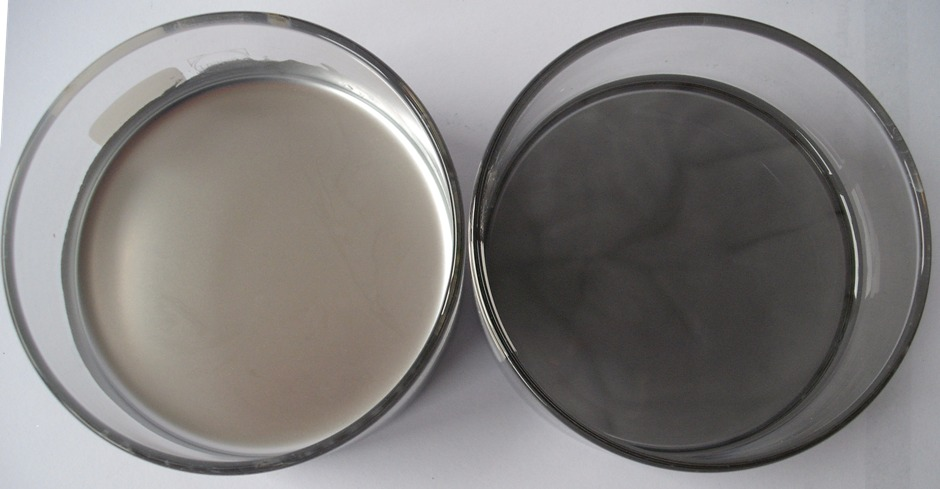
Comparison between a leafing aluminum pigment (left) and a non-leafing aluminum pigment (right)

=== Surface properties ===
Standard grades are also referred to as cornflakes due to their shape. These flakes are highly irregular and possess uneven surfaces. Cornflakes represent the original form of metal effect pigments. Since the early 1990s, rounded flakes with smooth surfaces have also been available. Owing to their shape, these are known as "silver dollars" and exhibit greater brightness and brilliance than cornflake types, making them widely used in modern coatings. Silver dollar types are produced from specially prepared semolina with a spherical surface. During grinding, these particles are deformed rather than crushed.

=== High-purity grades ===
In the past, aluminum grades with very high aluminum content were frequently used for premium coatings, such as automotive finishes. These grades provide significantly improved corrosion resistance compared with standard grades. However, their importance has declined due to the widespread adoption of two-layer coating systems (overcoating with clear lacquer).

== Manufacture ==
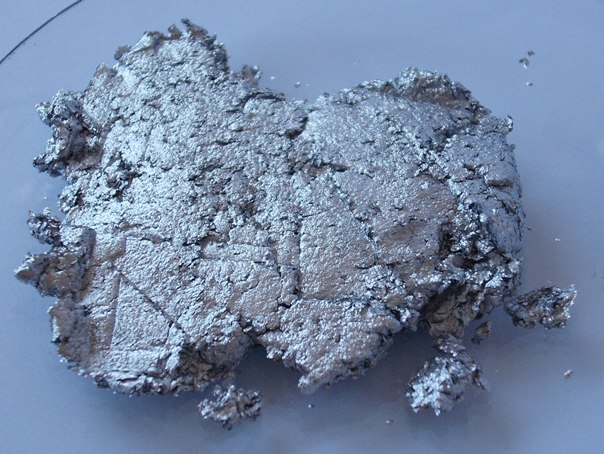
Aluminum pigment as pigment preparation

The metal to be processed (aluminum or brass) is first melted and, upon reaching the melting temperature, atomized from the melt. This produces irregularly shaped, spherical particles (semolina). The resulting metal powders are then transformed into flakes and comminuted in ball mills. For aluminum pigments, this process takes place in white spirit together with a lubricant (oleic acid for non-leafing pigments and stearic acid for leafing pigments), as otherwise there is a risk of dust explosion. In contrast, dry grinding can be carried out safely for brass pigments, since dust explosions do not occur due to their significantly higher density. After grinding, the white spirit is removed from the resulting mixture (slurry) using a filter press. In the final step, the filter cake is adjusted to the desired commercial form.

== Properties ==
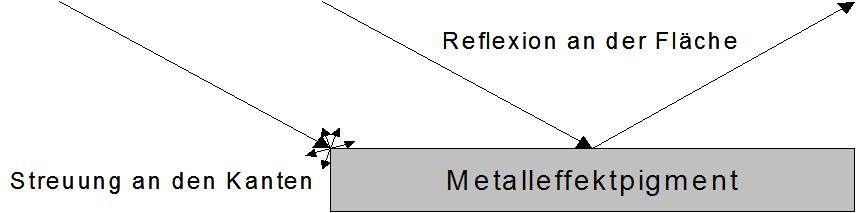
Optical effect of a single metal effect pigment

Metal effect pigments are approximately 20 micrometers in length and up to one micrometer in thickness. They can only develop their characteristic effect when aligned parallel to one another and to both the substrate and coating surface within the coating film. Incident light is reflected from the surface of the effect pigment and scattered at its edges. At shallow viewing angles, scattering predominates, causing the coating to appear dark. At steeper viewing angles, reflection dominates, making the paint—and thus the regions containing the effect pigment—appear bright. The variation in brightness with viewing angle is referred to as brightness flop. If individual pigment particles are visible, this is known as the sparkle effect. This effect is enhanced through the use of larger pigment particles. In contrast to pearlescent pigments, the pigment platelets themselves are opaque.

Due to their angle-dependent brightness, colorimetric evaluation is challenging. However, developments in colorimetry have led to the availability of multi-angle measuring devices that enable metrological assessment of these effects. Standardization]] was published in 2000.

Excessive shear force during dispersion can cause the platelets to fracture, preventing them from achieving the desired optical effect. Gentle processing is therefore essential when incorporating effect pigments. In low-viscosity systems, there is also a risk of sedimentation. In this context, commercially available pigment preparations are particularly important, as they require less intensive dispersion.

Elemental aluminum reacts with water to form aluminum hydroxide and hydrogen. Because the large specific surface area of the platelet-shaped particles intensifies this effect, the pigments may develop a grayish appearance. By using inhibitors or surface coatings (commonly based on silicon dioxide, aluminum oxide, or polyacrylates), applied through modifications of the Hall process, so-called gassing-stable aluminum pigments can be produced.

== Applications ==
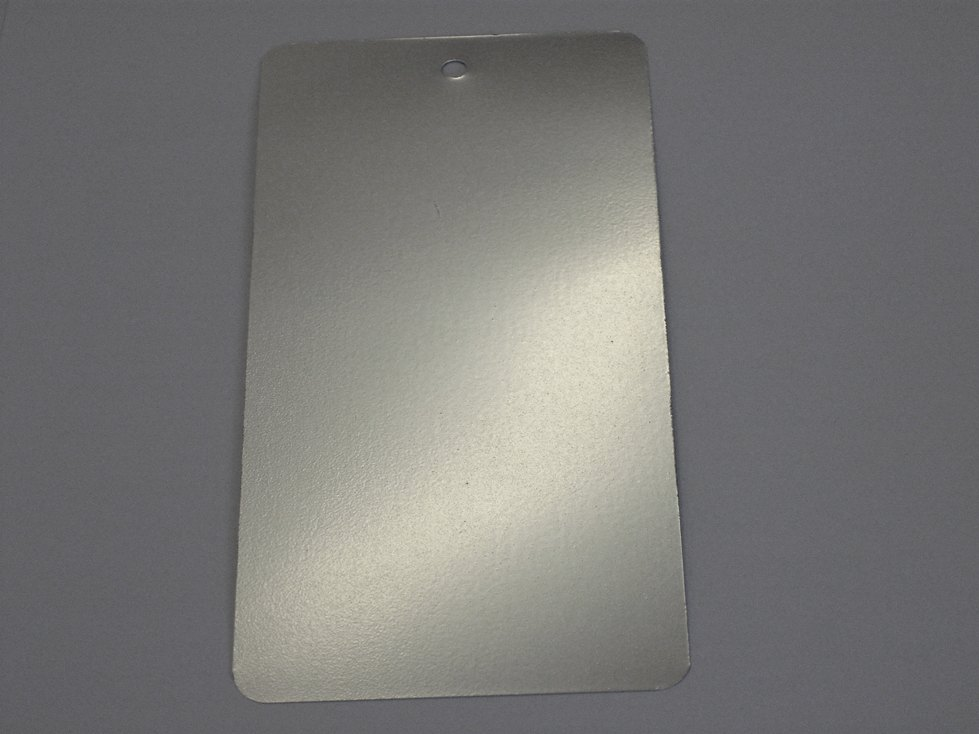
Metallic paint with aluminum pigment

As a substitute for expensive poliment gilding, "bronzes" were used in the 19th century for the industrial production of picture frames. Shellac served as a binding agent, and linseed oil was also used. To prevent oxidation, an additional layer of clear varnish was generally required. In the DIY sector, historical—even genuinely gilded—frames are often "refreshed" using metal pigments, which can make later restoration difficult.

Metal effect pigments have been used in paints, especially automotive coatings, since the 1920s. Another important application is powder coatings, although certain limitations apply in this area. In addition to these primary uses, the pigments are also employed in plastics, printing inks, and cosmetics.

== List of metal effect pigments listed in the Color Index ==
All metal effect pigments listed in the Colour Index are presented below. According to recent editions of the Colour Index, C.I. Pigment Metal 3, 4, and 5 are no longer available.

Generic Name	Constitution Number	Base metal / Alloy
C.I. Pigment Metal 1	C.I. 77000	Aluminum
C.I. Pigment Metal 2	C.I. 77400	Copper, Bronze
C.I. Pigment Metal 3	C.I. 77480	Gold
C.I. Pigment Metal 4	C.I. 77575	Lead
C.I. Pigment Metal 5	C.I. 77860	Zinc
C.I. Pigment Metal 6	C.I. 77945	Tin

== See also ==
- Effect pigment
