= Alumina effect pigment =

An alumina effect pigment is a pearlescent pigment based on alumina (aluminium oxide). It is used for decorative purposes on paints and plastics, giving them a matte, metal-like appearance.

== Production process ==
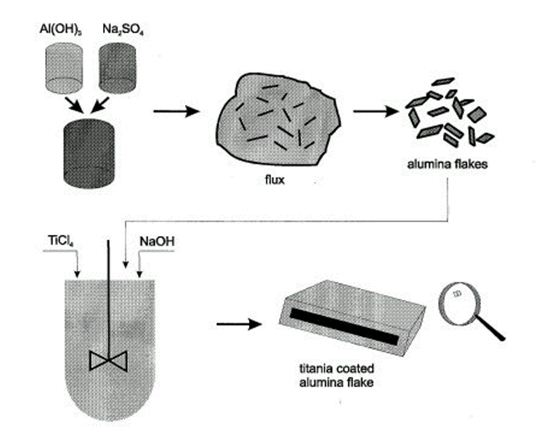
Fig. 1: Pure aluminium oxide flakes

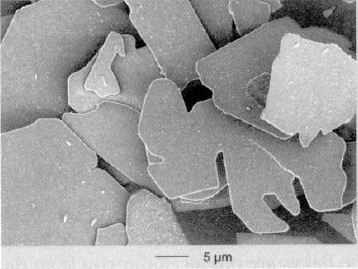
Pure aluminium oxide flakes

In the first step of the production process, Al_{2}O_{3} (Aluminium oxide) flakes with a very smooth surface are formed. The flakes are produced using a crystal growth process. They are formed in the corundum structure (α-Al_{2}O_{3}). The desired flake shape is achieved by controlled crystal growth in the axial and equatorial directions. The color purity and transparency of the effect pigments obtained by coating the Al_{2}O_{3} flakes with metal oxides can be attributed to the synthesis procedure yielding single-crystalline thin flakes

The coating of the alumina platelets with high-refractive metal oxides, such as with titanium dioxide and iron(III) oxide leads to strongly reflecting effect pigments. These pigments possess a strong glitter effect. The coating process is analogous to that used for metal oxide mica pigments except it starts from an aqueous suspension of Al_{2}O_{3} flakes. The complete manufacturing process of pigments based on aluminium oxide platelets, consisting of the flake production and the coating with metal oxides is shown in Figure 1

For outdoor applications they are modified with an additional weather stabilizing surface treatment.

== Products ==
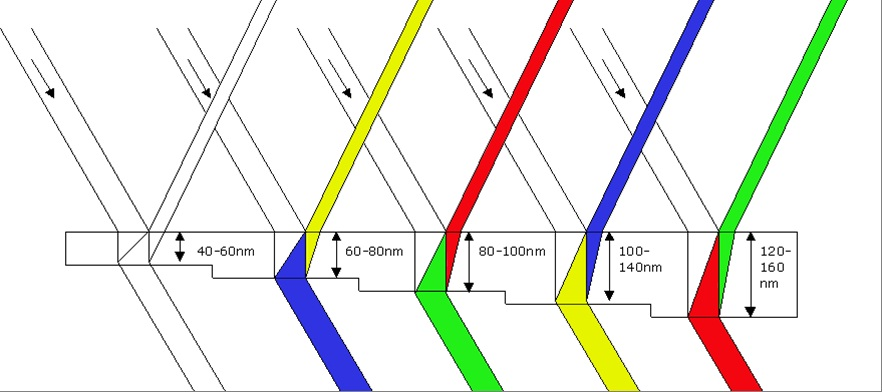
Thickness of TiO2 determines the inference color

Silverwhite and interference pigments based on Al_{2}O_{3}flakes can be produced—analogous to similar pigments based on mica platelets—in different colors, e.g. gold, red, blue or green, by variation of the titanium dioxide layer thickness.

Depending on the layer thickness, the coating with iron oxide leads to bronze-, copper- or red-colored effect pigments. The pigments obtainable at the market possess a narrow particle size distribution of about 5 to 30 μm as well as a high aspect ratio. The sparkle effect referred to above has its origin in the optimized thickness of all layers in the pigment structure, including the Al_{2}O_{3}substrate. Analytical investigations show that the thickness range of the aluminum oxide platelets and the resultant pigments can be controlled very precisely.

== Special effects ==
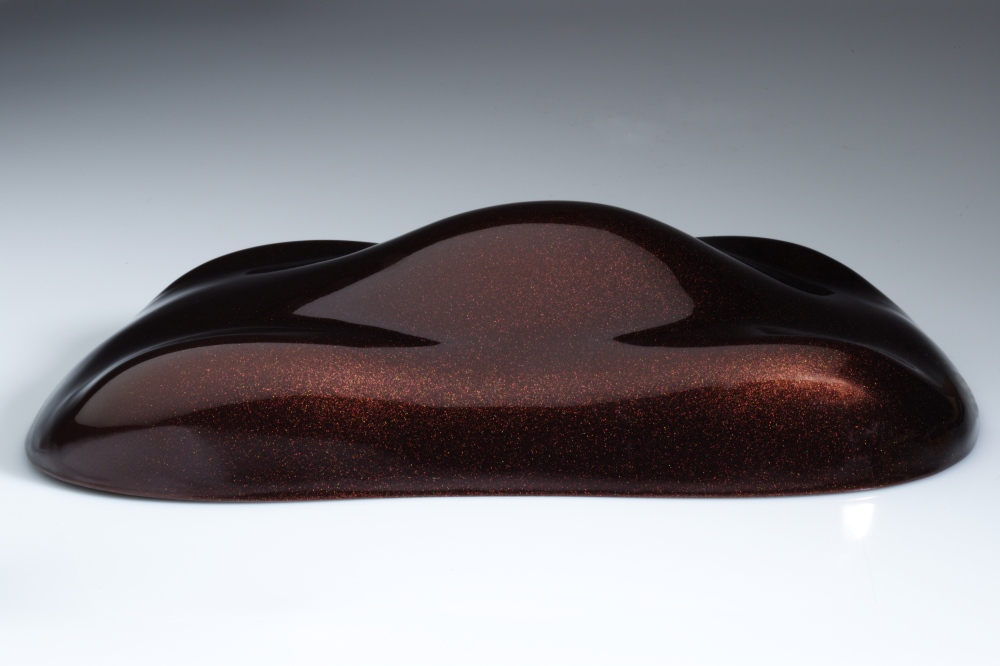
car dummy coated with iron oxide coated Alumina flake

The sparkle effect of the pigments in coating applications is controlled by the quantity of the added pigment. The effect is visible already at concentrations of 0.1% in the paint system. The intensity is steadily increased up to pigment concentrations of about 2%. The single light spots arising from the pigment structure and orientation in the paint system seem to spring back and forth when a painted metal plate is tilted. Also, the color of the other components of the paint has an influence in addition to the concentration of the pigment. A dark color, for example, forms a high contrast to the bright light spots and strengthens the effect. Favorable is also the use of a covering varnish in order to achieve an optimal effect.

The pigments can be applied with all painting techniques established for conventional pearlescent and interference pigments. Effect pigments based on alumina flakes may be applied in all substantial systems, i.e. in coatings, plastics, printing inks and cosmetic formulations. An additional surface treatment is applied to the pigment particles to adjust them to solvent-based and water-based coating systems. The pigments can be used in combination with many conventional pigments as well as with other effect pigments. Nearly unlimited styling possibilities are the result of these combinations.

== See also ==
- Effect pigment
- Xirallic

== Literature ==
- G. Pfaff: Special Effect Pigments. published by Vicentz Network GmbH, 2nd Edition, 2008, ISBN 3-86630-905-8
