= Effect pigment =

Pigment used to create special optical effects

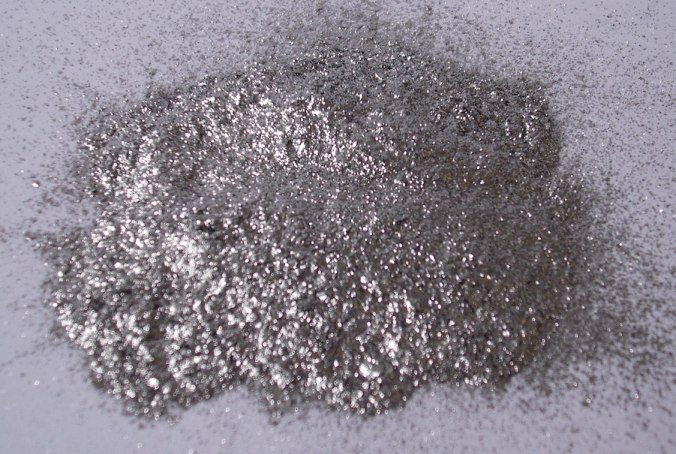
Aluminum pigment as powder

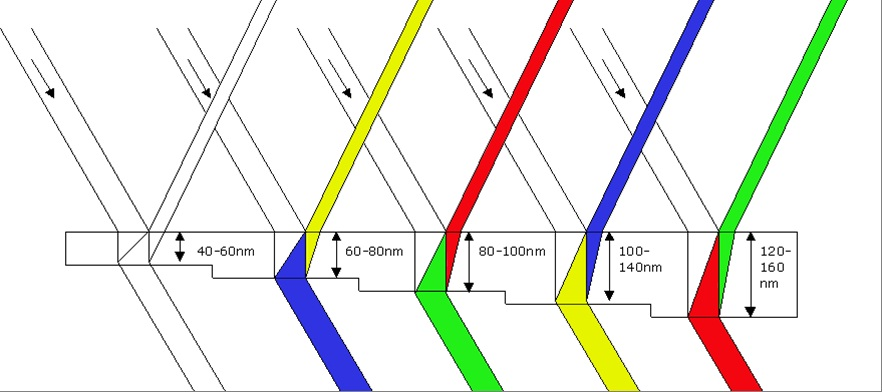
Thickness of TiO2 determines the inference color

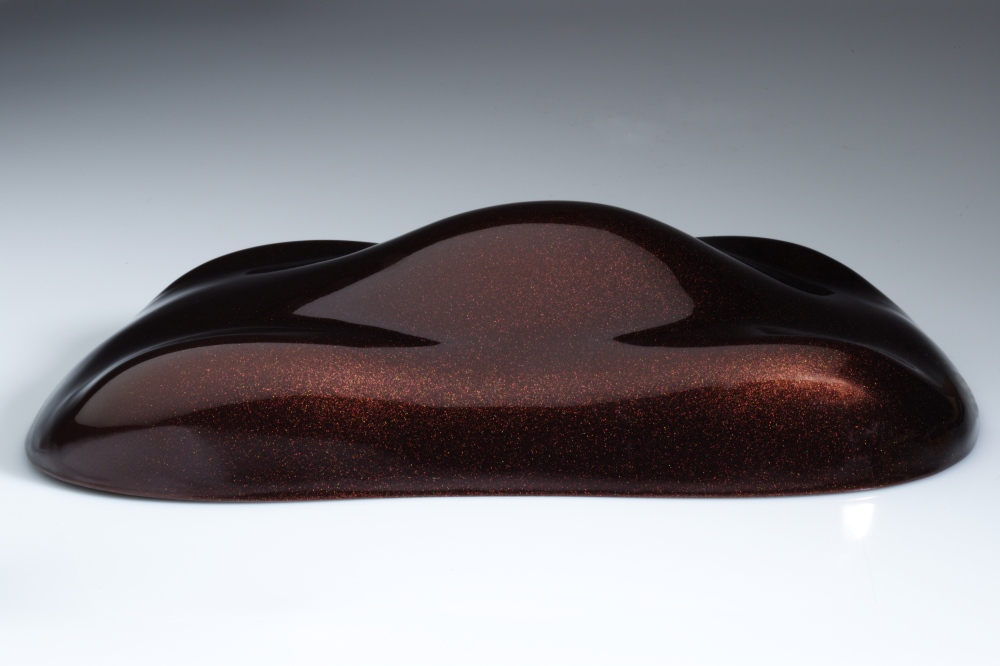
car dummy coated with iron oxide coated Alumina flake

Effect pigments are pigments used to create optical effects such as metallic appearance, pearlescence, glitter, and sparkling. They commonly consist of platelet-shaped particles whose optical effects depend on their orientation relative to the surrounding medium, incident light, and observer.

== Types ==
Metal effect pigments, formerly referred to as bronzes, are pigments used to create an optical metallic effect, commonly also described as a metallic appearance. These pigments typically consist of platelet-shaped particles with particle diameters generally in the two- to three-digit micrometer range, although tetrahedral particle geometries have also been documented, which help prevent inhomogeneities in the metallic effect (flow lines). The optical effect of these pigments is based on the alignment of the planar particle surfaces parallel to the surface of the surrounding medium, where directional reflection occurs.

Other effect pigments use non-metallic substrates, including many based on transparent or semitransparent platelet-shaped substrates, such as mica, alumina, silica, or glass, which may be coated with materials having a high refractive index, including titanium dioxide and iron(III) oxide. The optical effects of these can result from combinations of reflection, refraction, and thin-film interference, producing appearances such as pearlescence, iridescence, and angle-dependent color changes. An alumina effect pigment is a pearlescent pigment based on alumina (aluminium oxide). The coating of alumina platelets with high-refractive metal oxides such as titanium dioxide and iron(III) oxide produces strongly reflecting effect pigments with a pronounced glitter effect.

== Optical effects ==
The characteristic appearance of effect pigments varies with factors including particle size, particle orientation, and viewing angle. Metal effect pigments are approximately 20 micrometers in length and up to one micrometer in thickness. They develop their characteristic effect when aligned parallel to one another and to both the substrate and coating surface within the coating film. Incident light is reflected from the surface of the effect pigment and scattered at its edges. At shallow viewing angles, scattering predominates, causing the coating to appear dark, while at steeper viewing angles reflection predominates, causing the paint and regions containing the effect pigment to appear bright. The resulting variation in brightness with viewing angle is referred to as brightness flop.

If individual pigment particles are visible as bright points, this is known as the sparkle effect. The effect is enhanced through the use of larger pigment particles, and its appearance can vary with the geometry of illumination and observation.

In alumina effect pigments, the sparkle effect in coating applications is influenced by the concentration of pigment. Individual light spots arising from the pigment structure and orientation can appear to move as a painted surface is tilted. The color of other components of the paint also affects the visibility of the effect; a dark background, for example, increases the contrast with bright reflected points.

== Applications ==
Effect pigments are used in paints and other coatings, printing inks, plastics, and cosmetics. Metal effect pigments are widely used in metallic paint, including automotive coatings, while alumina effect pigments are used for decorative effects in paints and plastics.

== See also ==
- Alumina effect pigment
- Metal effect pigments
- Metallic paint
- Pearlescent coating
