= Xirallic =

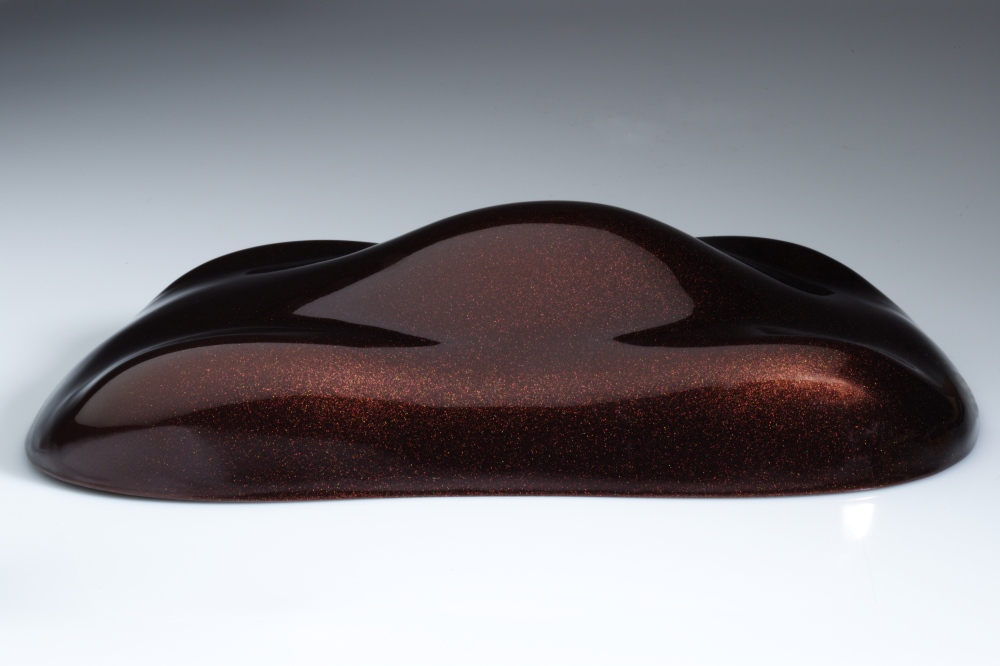
Car shape model varnished with an effect pigment based on an alumina substrate (Xirallic)

Xirallic is an alumina effect pigment made of aluminum oxide platelets covered with titanium oxide that shows a strong glitter effect with a distinct shimmering behavior.

It was developed and patented by researchers of the company Merck KGaA in Japan. Because the pigment was produced at a single plant in Onahama, production was severally curtailed following the 2011 Tōhoku earthquake and tsunami. The shortage of the pigment caused Ford and Chrysler to restrict the availability of cars and trucks in some red and black paints. The shortage also affected other automobile makes. Hyundai replaced Xirallic with mica in their paints. The plant reopened on 8 May 2011.

== See also ==
- Alumina effect pigment
