= Zinc white =

Inorganic pigment

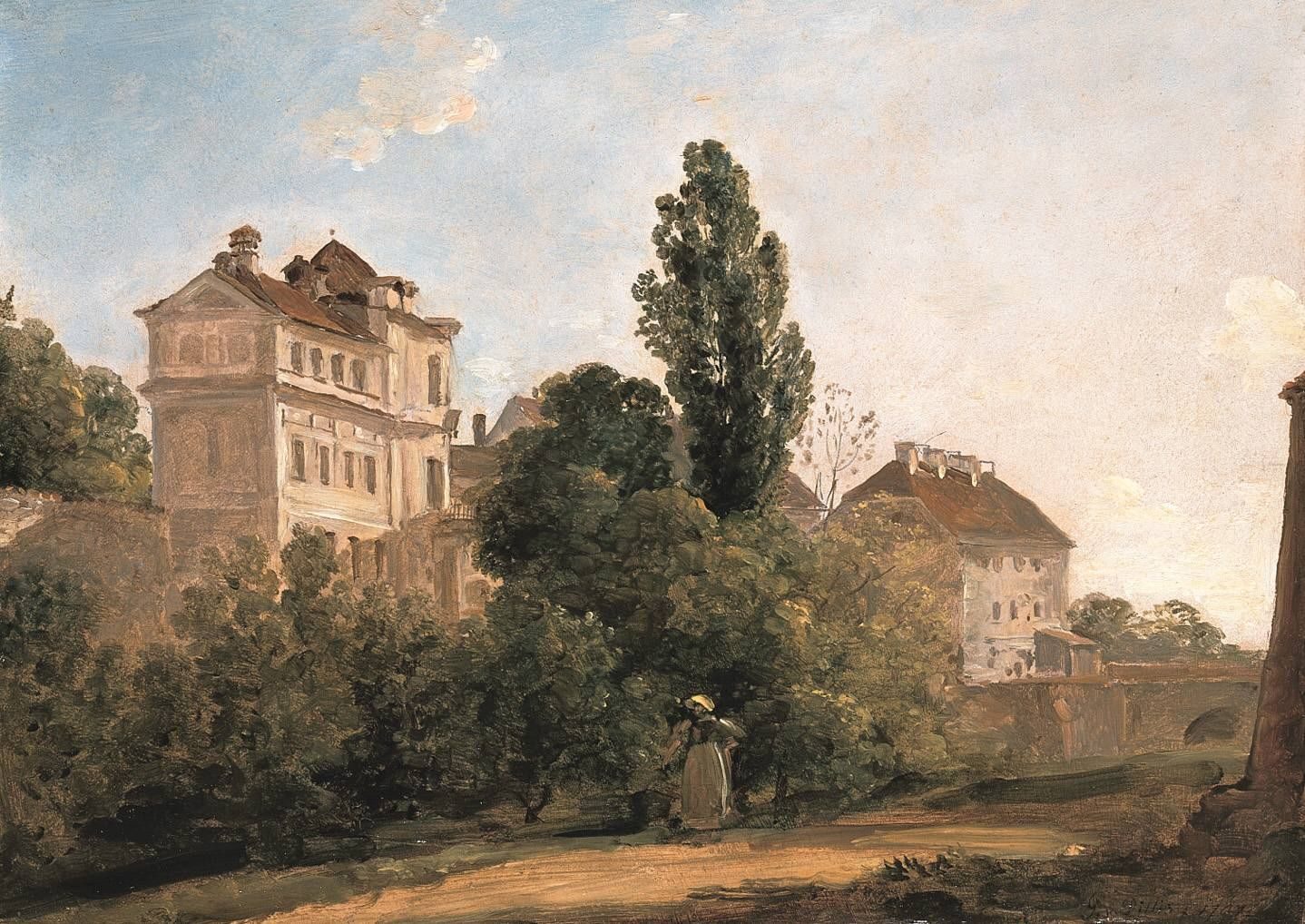
Johann Georg von Dills, Triva Castle, 1797. An early example of zinc white's use in painting

Zinc white is an inorganic pigment composed of zinc oxide that has been used by painters since the late eighteenth century. Alongside lead and titanium white, it is among the three most prominent white pigments that are commercially available today. Its primary advantages are its low toxicity (particularly in contrast with lead white) and the cool clarity of its color. It was initially developed in the 1780s by the French chemist and magistrate Louis-Bernard Guyton de Morveau, who struggled to popularize its use. The French Academy of Sciences approved of the invention in 1782, but artists from the French Royal Academy of Painting and Sculpture expressed skepticism. Initially, zinc white pigment was more costly to produce than lead white, but its price diminished as production methods improved over the course of the nineteenth century. While the superior safety of zinc white had been established by the end of the eighteenth century, manufacturers of lead white downplayed these differences, and lead continued to dominate the market for white paint until the early twentieth century.

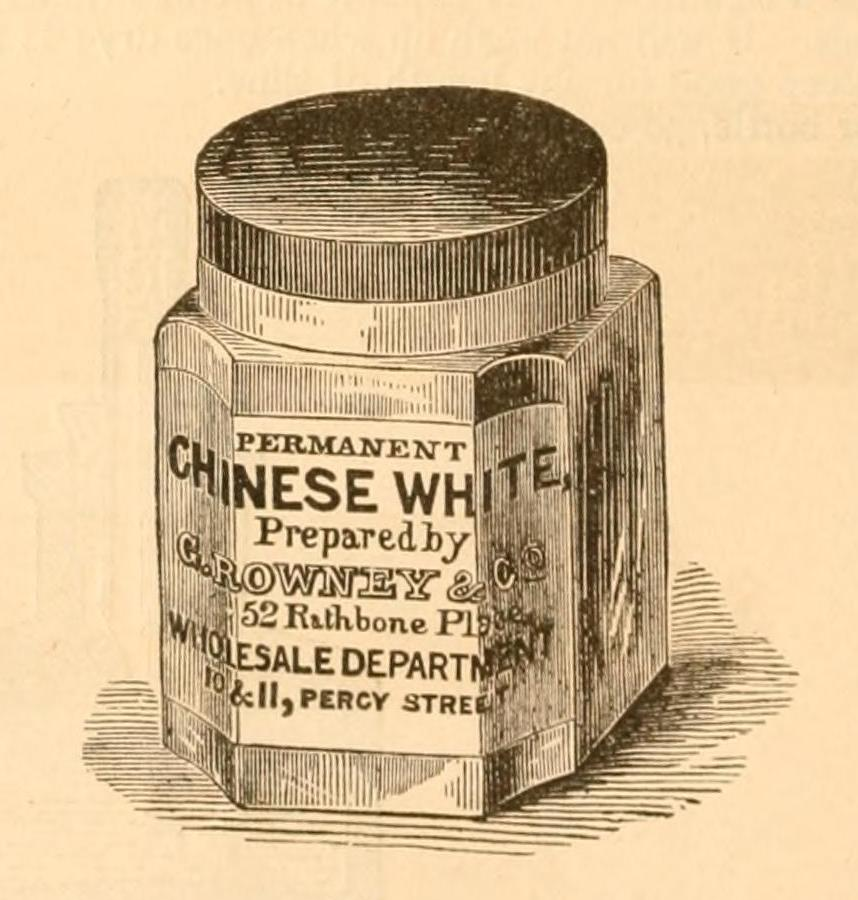
Zinc white was often marketed as "Chinese white" during the nineteenth century, as seen in this 1885 advertisement.

== History ==
Since antiquity, zinc oxide has been a readily available byproduct of brass production, but the idea of using it as a pigment was not widely considered until the eighteenth century. A major impetus for trying zinc oxide as a pigment was growing concern over the toxicity of lead-based white pigments. Initial experimentation occurred in Dijon in 1780; some accounts suggest that the initiative was led by the chemist Jean-Baptiste Courtois, while others credit Guyton de Morveau. A report drafted by Guyton de Morveau in 1782 brought the first significant attention to zinc oxide as a pigment. While the pigment was discussed in French and English sources throughout the 1780s, few artists reported having tried it at that time. The pigment was commercially available in Europe in the 1790s, but its use remained limited; commentators noted its high price and its thin viscosity.

The first major application for zinc white in painting was among watercolorists. Oil paints made with zinc white tended to dry slowly, but this problem did not occur with watercolor. The use of zinc white in watercolor was promoted in the 1830s by Winsor & Newton, which sold zinc white under the name "Chinese white." The name, which was later used by other manufacturers, may have been inspired by the European association of Chinese porcelain with pure white tones.

The paint manufacturer E. C. Leclaire is largely responsible for popularizing zinc white in oil painting. Working in the late 1830s and early 1840s, he improved the hiding power of zinc white and added siccatives that reduced its drying time in oil. He began industrially manufacturing zinc white in 1845, and others soon followed in the 1850s.

== Visual properties ==
Zinc white has a cooler hue than lead white, which tends to have a yellowish cast. Zinc white generally needs to be mixed with greater quantities of oil than lead white in order to create a spreadable oil paint, which reduces its hiding power; on their own, lead and zinc white refract light more or less equally.

== Permanence ==
Zinc white is much more resistant to yellowing compared to other white pigments when mixed with oil. However, paint made with zinc white tends to yield more brittle surfaces than other white paints, and its use can sometimes result in cracks. The brittleness of zinc white paint has proven to be a major issue in the work of Pre-Raphaelite painters.

== Notable occurrences ==
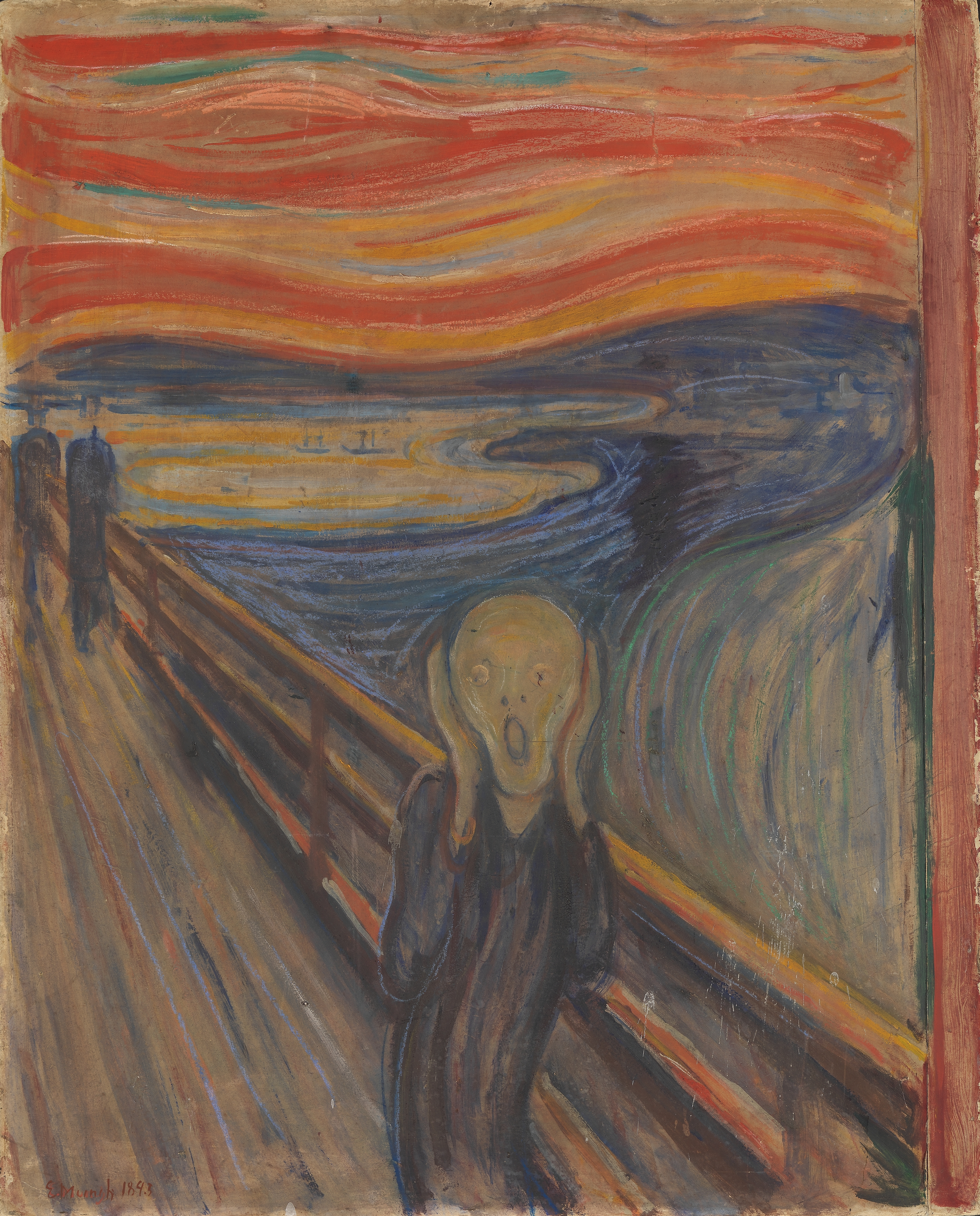
Edvard Munch, The Scream, 1893. Laboratory analysis has revealed the presence of zinc white in the painting.

While zinc white was available to painters by the end of the eighteenth century, relatively few examples of its use have been found before 1850, when its adoption steadily increased. Members of the Pre-Raphaelite Brotherhood embraced zinc white, frequently using it in their ground layers. John Singer Sargent used small amounts of zinc white in his work, but he favored lead white. The Impressionists almost completely avoided zinc white, according to laboratory analysis of their paintings. When zinc white has been found in works by Impressionists, it generally constitutes a lightening agent that was added to another color by the paint manufacturer, not the artist. Zinc white has been found in numerous works by Edvard Munch, including several versions of The Scream.
