= Titanium white =

White pigment invented in the 20th century

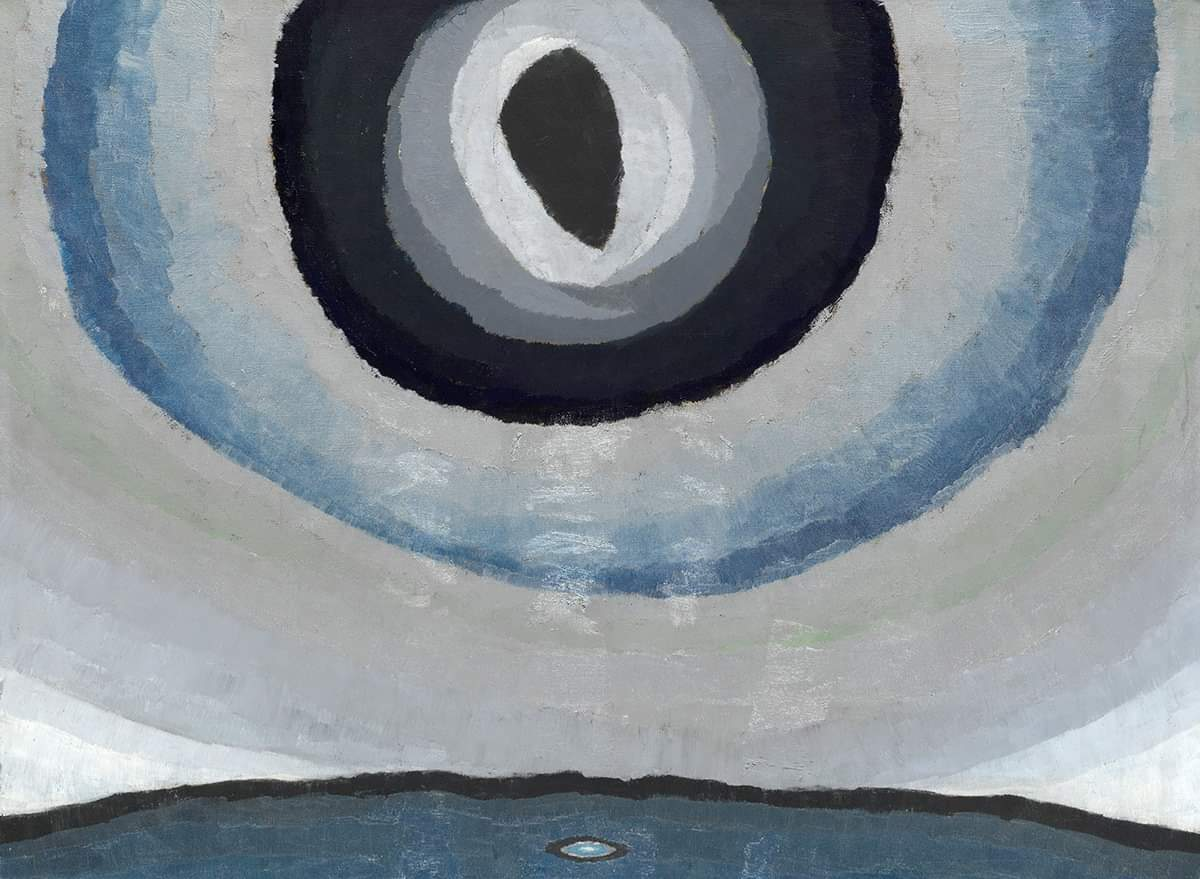
Arthur Dove, Silver Sun, 1929. The painting is an early documented instance of titanium white's use.

Titanium white, also Pigment White 6 or CI 77891, is a family of white pigments composed primarily of titanium dioxide. It is the most widely used white pigment in contemporary artistic applications because of its affordability, low toxicity, and high hiding power. Though the term titanium white most often refers to pigments containing titanium dioxide, it can also describe any white pigment that contains a titanium compound (e.g. zinc titanate, barium titanate, potassium titanate, titanium lithopone, titanium silicate).

== History ==
Titanium dioxide (TiO_{2}) is a bright white substance first named and created in a laboratory in the mid-19th century. It was initially used as a pigment in the ceramic arts for yellow glazes later in the century, and by the 1890s artists started to use white mixtures containing the compound. Industrial adoption of titanium dioxide in the early 20th century depended on improvements in pigment processing, including refining and grinding techniques that made the compound suitable for stable dispersion in oil-based paints.

According to a report spoken by Noel Heaton at a meeting of the Royal Society for the Encouragement of Arts, Manufactures and Commerce the first use of titanium compounds as pigments seemed to have been made by Dr. John Overton around 1870. Titanium dioxide became dominant in the paint industry because it had significantly higher tinting strength and hiding power than earlier white pigments such as lead white and zinc white. This meant manufacturers needed less pigment to achieve the same level of coverage, making it more economically efficient for large-scale industrial paint production. These properties helped drive its adoption in the early 20th century. The pigment was further developed for industrial use in the 1910s by the Titanium Pigment Company in the United States and the Titan Company in Norway, each working independently. The two manufactures cross-licensed their patents in 1920. By the late 1920s, titanium and zinc white had unseated lead white as the dominant product in the market for white pigment. Most art supply companies now explicitly advise that titanium white should be used instead of lead white for safety reasons.

== Visual characteristics ==
Titanium white provides greater hiding power and tinting strength than any other white pigment. Titanium white was initially more expensive to produce than lead white, but its superior hiding power soon made it a more economical choice because smaller quantities were required to achieve the same degree of opacity.

== Notable occurrences ==
Titanium white featured regularly in the palette of Arthur Dove, who was among its earliest adopters in the 1920s, as well as Bob Ross in The Joy of Painting, decades later. It has also been identified in the work of Thomas Hart Benton, Diego Rivera, Pablo Picasso, and Jackson Pollock.
