= Lead white =

White pigment

Lead white is a thick, opaque, and heavy white pigment composed primarily of basic lead carbonate, 2PbCO_{3}·Pb(OH)_{2}, with a crystalline molecular structure. It was the most widely produced and used white pigment in different parts of the world from antiquity until the nineteenth century, when it was displaced by less toxic zinc white and later by titanium white. Lead white has maintained relatively consistent production methods across times and regions, yet it has a wide range of applications in different contexts, such as home decoration, art production, and cosmetics. Given its affordability and distinctive visual qualities, lead white was particularly favored and generously used by artists in their paintings. However, most art supply companies now explicitly advise against the use of lead white because of the risk that it poses of lead poisoning. Even after this drawback was known, it continued to be used in paintings and cosmetics.

== Production methods ==
As one of the oldest synthetically produced pigments, lead white has been artificially produced in different cultures and periods using roughly the same production methods. A common technique in antiquity involved placing lead shavings above vinegar within specially designed clay pots, allowing the acidic vapors to react with the lead. As early as 300 B.C., such preparation of lead white from metallic lead and vinegar was probably used in China and later introduced to Japan in the seventh century. In seventeenth century Holland, the "Dutch" or "stack" method of producing lead white improved slightly upon the ancient process through the additional step of sealing clay pots in a room filled with horse manure or waste tan bark, which provided a source of heat and carbon dioxide, yielding basic lead carbonate through the combined action of the acetic vapors, carbonic acid, and heat. In England, a monopoly was granted for production of lead white in 1622.

== History of use ==
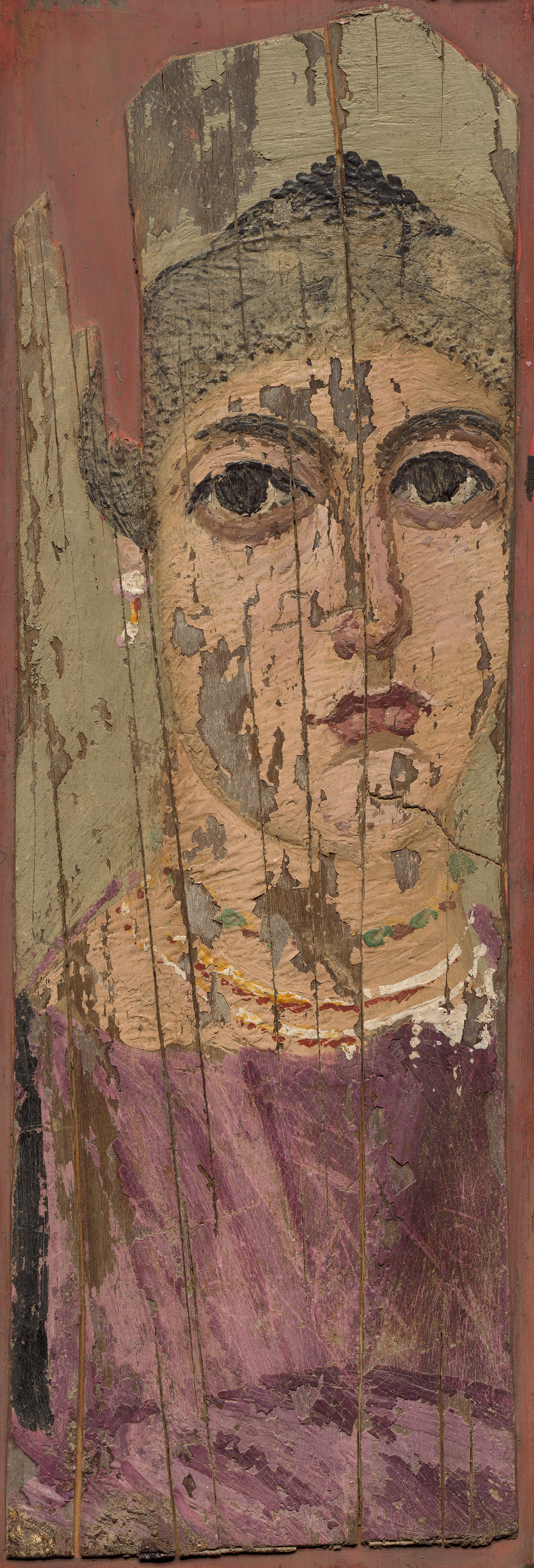
Portrait of a Woman, 2nd century, National Gallery of Art, Washington, D.C. The painting is an early documented instance of lead white's use.

Lead white has been widely used in various contexts across different cultures from ancient times to the present. Until the twentieth century, this highly versatile pigment was used in numerous applications, including enamel for ceramic tableware and bathroom fittings, house paints, and wallpapers. Within the realm of painting, lead white was occasionally used in wall paintings and tempera paintings on paper and silk in early times in China and Japan. Well into the nineteenth century, it was the sole white pigment used in European easel painting and had been widely adopted by artists due to its affordable costs and distinctive qualities, until the advent of zinc white. In modern times, titanium dioxide has largely taken the place of lead white due to safety concerns.

The danger of lead poisoning made lead white cosmetics especially hazardous. In eighteenth-century Europe, upper-class men and women powdered their face and body with beauty products to accentuate their white complexion as a sign of their affluence. Lead white, one of the most popular ingredients used in cosmetics to whiten the skin, was favored for its opacity in spite of the well-known risk of lead poisoning. In other cultural contexts such as Greece, China, and Japan, white lead had long been a popular cosmetic foundation to make skin look smooth and pale. Despite the fatal danger of lead poisoning, the use of white lead in cosmetics persisted for an extended period of time in history across many cultures.

== Visual characteristics ==
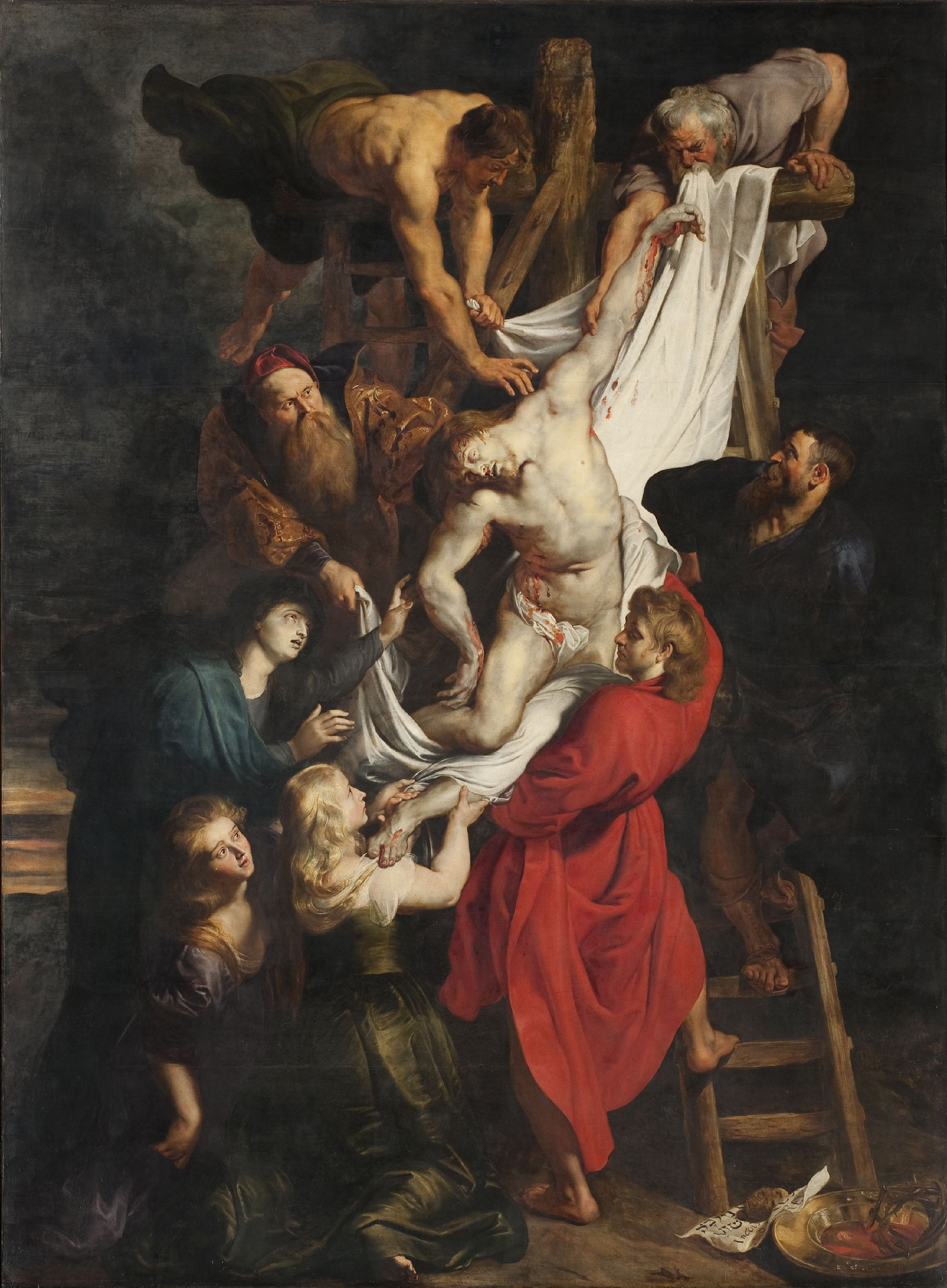
Peter Paul Rubens, Descent from the Cross (Central Panel), 1611–13. The Courtauld, London (Samuel Courtauld Trust). The painting exemplifies the use of a priming technique that mixed lead white with chalk by Dutch painters.

Given its high refractive index and low oil-absorption index, lead white generally requires a small amount of oil to make workable pastes with high hiding power. It has served to delineate forms in underpainting, for the modeling of bodies, and for highlights because of its high opacity and adherence. Today, when paintings are X-rayed, the often dense outline of lead white can appear as a kind of skeleton within a painting, indicating the underdrawing. In addition to being used independently, lead white is frequently used to produce tints of other colors. In combination with blue, it appears often in depictions of the sky, and it is commonly used with red and brown pigments to create flesh tones. Additionally, admixtures of lead white with other whites such as calcium carbonate and chalk for making opaque watercolor may also be encountered in paintings, especially those created by sixteenth and seventeenth-centuries Dutch artists.

== Permanence ==
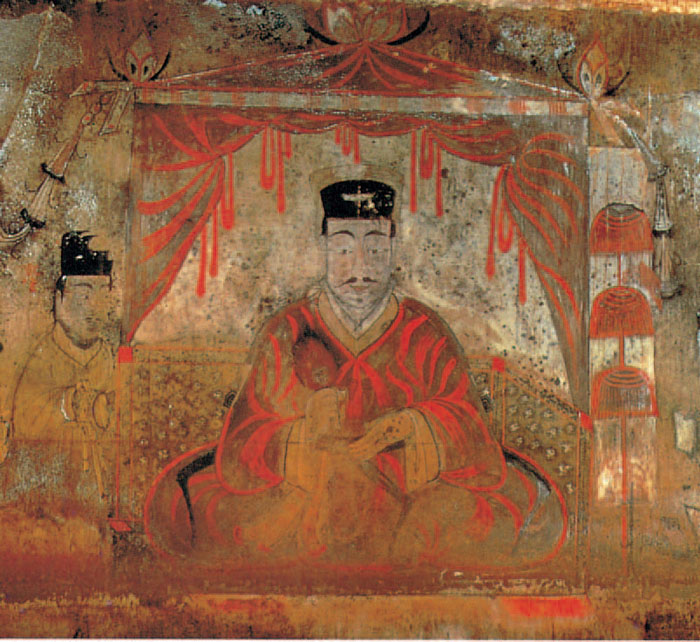
A mural painting in Anak Tomb No. 3, in which the use of lead white as the base layer to prime the cave wall has enabled the mural to maintain its fresh appearance for centuries.

Lead white is compatible with various binding media and has remarkable permanence, being lightfast.However, its permanence also depends on its relationships to different media. Most of the lead white of European paintings was ground in vegetable drying oil, particularly linseed oil with superior drying properties. Once the mixture has completely dried, it results in a tough and resistant film that is less prone to swelling in organic solvents compared to other oil-pigment mixtures. While lead white locked in a drying oil film and protected with varnish endures for centuries without blackening, it turns black when used in watercolor, as seen in the highlights of old master drawings, due to the presence of hydrogen sulfide in the air.

== Notable occurrences ==
The ubiquity of lead white for much of recorded history makes its occurrences in both western and non-western art widespread. Several examples, significant for their early date, are Fayum portraits from the second century CE. Over eighty Dutch paintings dating from the mid-fifteenth to the mid-nineteenth centuries have been found to contain lead white. Lead white can also be found in paintings well into the 20th century, including in the work of major artists such as Picasso. There are a number of occurrences of lead white as a pigment in East Asian paintings, especially murals or silk paintings. Most notable among them are the Dunhuang cave paintings found in western China, which date from the ninth or tenth century, as well as the Japanese wall paintings in the Daigo-ji Pagoda and the Korean mural paintings in Anak Tomb No. 3.
