= Masterbatch =

Additive used to color or impart other properties from plastic

A masterbatch is a concentrated mixture of pigments and / or additives blended and extruded together in a carrier matrix, such as resin or wax, that is used to add these mixed additives to a final plastic product. The additives may be used for colouring (a "colour masterbatch") or for imparting other properties (an "additive masterbatch"). The typical alternative to using a masterbatch is to compound the plastic from raw undiluted additives.

== Manufacturing plastics from masterbatches ==
The general process for the manufacture of masterbatches involves first identifying and weighing the needed pigments and/or additives, then mixing the pigments or additives with a carrier resin or polymer. Finally, the concentrated mixture is extruded, cooled and formed into granules, powders, or other masterbatch vehicles and the final product is bagged.

The carrier material of the masterbatch can be based on wax (a universal carrier) or a specific polymer that is identical to or compatible with the natural polymer used (a polymer-specific carrier). Polymers such as EVA or LDPE can be used as carriers for polyolefins and nylon, while polystyrene can be used for ABS, SAN, and sometimes polycarbonates. When a carrier other than the base plastic is used, this carrier material may modify the resulting plastic's properties. The usual ratio of masterbatch to base polymer is 1–5%. Several masterbatches (colors and various additives) can be used together.

Processing machines are usually fed with premixed granules of the host polymer and the masterbatch, where the final mixing takes place in the screw and extrusion parts of the processor. Granule processing is sometimes prone to causing adverse effects, such as the separation of the masterbatch and the base material in the hopper. As an alternative, the masterbatch can be added directly to the machine's screw as a free-flowing solid or, if the masterbatch is liquid, by a peristaltic pump. Such use of liquid masterbatches allows highly accurate dosing and quick color changes between machine runs.

Masterbatches are highly concentrated compared to the target composition, with high "let-down ratios"; for example, often 25 kgs of a masterbatch can be used to compound one ton of base polymer.

The dilutive nature of masterbatches, compared to raw additives, allows for higher accuracy in dosing small amounts of expensive additives. The use of granular solid masterbatches reduces problems with dust typically inherent to the use of finer-grained solid additives. Solid masterbatches have longer shelf lives than solutions in solvents, which evaporate over time. The masterbatch usually contains 40–65% of the additive, but the range can be as wide as 15–80% in extreme cases.

== Using masterbatches in plastic manufacturing ==
The additives in a masterbatch are chosen to impart desired physical property changes to a final plastic product. They can increase volumetric output due to thermal conductivity and volumetric expansion at a given temperature as well as potentially increasing the toughness, flexural stiffness, adhesion, and printability of a final product. The additives in a masterbatch can modify the permanent electrical conductivity of a plastic product, which can prevent problems caused by static electrical charges, or the specific heat capacity, which can help reduce material costs by reducing energy used to run the machine.

Depending on the needs of the output product, manufacturers mix primary plastic with additives in a certain amount. These raw materials are mixed through the process of casting, compression and pressing to create the masterbatch, which can be used directly as an input material or in combination with other materials to make plastic products through different forming methods.

== Applications of masterbatches ==
Additive masterbatches modify various properties of the base plastic:

- Ultraviolet light resistance
- Flame Retardant
- Anti-fouling
- Anti-static
- Lubrication
- Anti-slip
- Corrosion Inhibitors for metals packaged in plastic
- Anti-microbials
- Anti-oxidants / Polymer stabilizers
- Extrusion aids
- Phosphorescence
- Anti-Counterfeit
- Product Security

Masterbatches are used in the following areas:

- Plastics and Packaging Industry: Masterbatch is extensively used in the plastics and packaging sector for colouring and enhancing the properties of plastic materials used in packaging products.
- Automotive Industry: Masterbatch is applied in the automotive sector for colouring and improving the properties of plastic components used in vehicle interiors, exteriors, and various parts.
- Textile Industry: In the textile industry, masterbatch is used for colouring and modifying the properties of synthetic fibres and fabrics, such as polyester and nylon.
- Agricultural Film Production: Masterbatch is employed in the production of agricultural films, contributing to properties like UV resistance and durability.
- Construction and Building Materials: Masterbatch is used in the construction industry to enhance the properties of plastic materials used in pipes, cables, and other building components.
- Medical Devices: In the medical industry, masterbatch is used in the manufacturing of plastic components for medical devices, ensuring compliance with regulatory standards.
- Electronics: Masterbatch is applied in the electronics industry for colouring and improving the properties of plastic parts used in electronic devices and components.
- Furniture Manufacturing: Masterbatch is used in the production of plastic components for furniture, providing colour options and enhancing material properties.
- Food Packaging: Masterbatch is employed in the food packaging industry to colour and modify the properties of plastic materials used in packaging for food products.
