= List of inorganic pigments =

The following list includes commercially or artistically important inorganic pigments of natural and synthetic origin.

== Purple pigments ==
Aluminosilicate pigments

- Ultramarine violet (PV15): a synthetic or naturally occurring sulfur containing silicate mineral.

Arsenic pigments

- London purple — an arsenical insecticide/pigment mixture derived from aniline-dye waste.

Copper pigments

- Han purple: BaCuSi_{2}O_{6}.

Cobalt pigments

- Cobalt violet (PV14): Co_{3}(PO_{4})_{2}.

Gold pigments

- Purple of Cassius: Gold nanoparticles suspended in tin dioxide - Au_{x} • SnO_{2}.

Iron pigments

- Caput mortuum (Mars Violet) — a purple‑brown hematite iron oxide pigment, Fe_{2}O_{3}.

Manganese pigments

- Manganese violet: NH_{4}MnP_{2}O_{7} (PV16) manganic ammonium pyrophosphate.

Strontium pigments

- Strontium Violet (PV62) — Sr_{5}(PO_{4})_{3}Cu_{0.3}O.

== Blue pigments ==
Aluminosilicate pigments

- Ultramarine (PB29): a synthetic or naturally occurring sulfur containing silicate mineral - Na_{8–10}Al_{6}Si_{6}O_{24}S_{2–4} (generalized formula).
- Smalt CoO·nSiO_{2}.

Cobalt pigments

- Cobalt blue (PB28): cobalt(II) aluminate.
- Cerulean blue (PB35): cobalt(II) stannate.
- Cerium uranium blue
- Cobalt chromite blue-green spinel CoCr_{2}O_{4}.
- Cobalt zinc aluminate spinel CoZnAl_{2}O_{4}.

Copper pigments

- Azurite Cu_{3}(CO_{3})_{2}(OH)_{2}.
- Blue Verditer Cu_{2}(OH)_{2}CO_{3}.

Iron pigments

- Prussian blue (PB27): a synthetic inert pigment made of iron and cyanide: C_{18}Fe_{7}N_{18}.
- Vivianite Fe_{3}(PO_{4})_{2}·8H_{2}O.

Manganese pigments

- YInMn Blue: a synthetic pigment (YIn_{1−x}Mn_{x}O_{3}).
- Manganese blue: barium manganate(VI) sulfate.

Zirconium pigments

- Zirconium–vanadium blue zircon ZrSiO_{4}:V.

== Green pigments ==
Arsenic Pigments

- Scheele's Green: yellowish-green pigment commonly used during the early to mid-19th century (AsCuHO_{3}).
- Paris Green: It was manufactured in 1814 to be a pigment to make a vibrant green paint.

Cadmium pigments

- Cadmium green: a light green pigment consisting of a mixture of cadmium yellow (CdS) and chrome green (Cr_{2}O_{3}).

Chromium pigments

- Chrome green (PG17): anhydrous chromium(III) oxide (Cr_{2}O_{3}).
- Viridian (PG18): hydrated chromium(III) oxide Cr_{2}O_{3} • xH_{2}O.

Cobalt pigments

- Cobalt green: also known as Rinman's green or zinc green (CoZnO_{2}).
- Cobalt titanate green CoTiO_{3}.

Copper pigments

- Malachite: cupric carbonate hydroxide (Cu_{2}CO_{3}(OH)_{2}), unstable.
- Scheele's Green (also called Schloss green): cupric arsenite (CuHAsO_{3}).
- Brunswick green: various pigments, some with copper.
- Verdigris Cu(CH_{3}COO)_{2}·nCu(OH)_{2}.
- Atacamite Cu_{2}Cl(OH)_{3}.
- Brochantite Cu_{4}SO_{4}(OH)_{6}.
- Green verditer Cu_{2}(OH)_{2}CO_{3}.
- Egyptian Green CaCuSi_{4}O_{10} + Fe compounds.

Other pigments

- Green earth: also known as terre verte and Verona green (K[(Al,Fe^{3+}),(Fe^{2+},Mg](AlSi_{3},Si_{4})O_{10}(OH)_{2}).

== Yellow pigments ==
Arsenic pigments

- Orpiment: natural monoclinic arsenic sulfide (As_{2}S_{3}).
- Pararealgar AsS.

Bismuth pigments

- Primrose yellow (PY184): bismuth vanadate (BiVO_{4}).
- Bismuth molybdate Bi_{2}MoO_{6}.

Cadmium pigments

- Cadmium yellow (PY37): cadmium sulfide (CdS), which also occurs as the mineral greenockite.
- Cadmium Lemon (PY37) CdS + ZnS.

Chromium pigments

- Chrome yellow or crocoite (PY34): lead chromate (PbCrO_{4}).
- Strontium yellow (PY32): SrCrO_{4}.
- Barium Yellow (PY31) BaCrO_{4}.
- Zinc Yellow (PY36) 4ZnCrO_{4}·K_{2}O·H_{2}O.

Cobalt pigments

- Aureolin or cobalt yellow (PY40): potassium cobaltinitrite (K_{3}Co(NO_{2})_{6}).

Iron pigments

- Yellow ochre (PY43): a naturally occurring clay of monohydrated ferric oxide (Fe_{2}O_{3}·H_{2}O).
- Mars Yellow (PY42) Fe_{2}O_{3}·nH_{2}O.

Lead pigments

- Naples yellow (PY41).
- Lead-tin-yellow: PbSnO_{4} or Pb(Sn,Si)O_{3}.
- Massicot PbO.

Titanium pigments

- Titanium yellow (PY53): NiO·Sb_{2}O_{3}·20TiO_{2}.

Tin pigments

- Mosaic gold: stannic sulfide (SnS_{2}).

Zinc pigments

- Zinc yellow (PY36): zinc chromate (ZnCrO_{4}), a highly toxic substance with anti-corrosive properties which was historically most often used to paint over metals.

== Orange pigments ==
Arsenic pigments

- Realgar As_{4}S_{4}.

Bismuth pigments

- Bismuth Vanadate Orange (PO86) BiVO_{4}.
- Bismuth Oxyhalide Orange (PO85) BiOCl·Bi_{2}S_{3}.

Cadmium pigments

- Cadmium orange (PO20): an intermediate between cadmium red and cadmium yellow: cadmium sulfoselenide.

Vanadium pigments

- Bismuth vanadate orange (PO86): similar to vermilion.

== Red pigments ==
Arsenic pigments

- Realgar: As_{4}S_{4} - a highly toxic natural pigment.

Cadmium pigments

- Cadmium red (PR108): cadmium sulfo-selenide (Cd2SSe).

Cerium pigments

- Cerium sulfide red (PR265).

Iron oxide pigments

- Sanguine, Caput mortuum, Indian red, Venetian red, oxide red (PR102).
- Red ochre (PR102): anhydrous Fe_{2}O_{3}.
- Burnt sienna (PBr7): a pigment produced by heating raw sienna.

Lead pigments

- Minium (pigment): also known as red lead, lead tetroxide, Pb_{3}O_{4}.

Mercury pigments

- Vermilion or cinnabar (PR106): HgS.

== Brown pigments ==
Clay earth pigments (naturally formed iron oxides)

- Raw umber (PBr7): a natural clay pigment consisting of iron oxide, manganese oxide and aluminum oxide: Fe_{2}O_{3} + MnO_{2} + nH_{2}O + SiO_{2} + Al_{2}O_{3}. When calcined (heated) it is referred to as burnt umber and has more intense colors.
- Raw sienna (PBr7): a naturally occurring yellow-brown pigment from limonite clay. Used in art since prehistoric times.

== Black pigments ==
Carbonaceous pigments

- Aniline black (PBk1).
- Lamp black (PBk6).
- Carbon black (PBk7).
- Vine black (PBk8).
- Ivory black (PBk9).
- Graphite (PBk10).
- Mineral Black (PBk18).

Iron pigments

- Mars black or Iron black (PBk11) (C.I. No.77499) Synthetic magnetite Fe_{3}O_{4}.

Manganese pigments

- Manganese dioxide (PBk14): blackish or brown in color, used since prehistoric times (MnO_{2}).
- Iron manganese oxide (PBk33, (Fe,Mn)_{2}O_{3}).

Molybdenum pigments

- Molybdenum Disulfide (PBk34).

Titanium pigments

- Titanium black: Titanium(III) oxide (Ti_{2}O_{3}).
- Titanium Dioxide Black: (PBk35) (CAS 51745-87-0) Reduced titanium oxide.

Others

- Iron Titanium Brown Spinel (PBk12).
- Cobalt Black (PBk13).
- Zinc Sulfide (PBk17).
- Slate Black (PBk19).
- Copper Chromite Black (PBk22, PBk28).
- Tin Antimony Gray (PBk23).
- Titanium Vanadium Antimony Gray (PBk24).
- Cobalt Nickel Gray (PBk25).
- Manganese Ferrite Black (PBk26) (Fe,Mn)_{2}O_{4.}
- Iron Cobalt Chromite Black (PBk27).
- Iron Cobalt Black (PBk29).
- Chrome Iron Nickel Black (PBk30).

== White pigments ==
Antimony pigment

- Antimony white: antimony(III) oxide (Sb_{2}O_{3}).

Barium pigments

- Barium sulfate (PW5 or baryte): barium sulfate (BaSO_{4}).
- Lithopone: BaSO_{4}•ZnS.

Lead pigment

- Cremnitz white (PW1): basic lead(II) carbonate ((PbCO_{3})_{2}·Pb(OH)_{2}).

Titanium pigment

- Titanium white (PW6): titanium(IV) oxide (TiO_{2}).

Zinc pigments

- Zinc white (PW4): zinc oxide (ZnO).
- Sachtolith: zinc sulfide (ZnS).

== Fluorescent pigments ==
- Uranium salts.

== Safety ==
A number of pigments, especially traditional ones, contain heavy metals such as lead, mercury, and cadmium that are highly toxic. The use of these pigments is now highly restricted in many countries. For more information, see the article on lead paint.

== See also ==
- List of dyes
- Blue pigments
- Green pigments
- Red pigments
