= Verdigris =

Green copper-based pigment

Color coordinates
- Hex triplet: #43B3AE
- sRGB^{B} (r, g, b): (67, 179, 174)
- HSV (h, s, v): (177°, 63%, 70%)
- CIELCh_{uv} (L, C, h): (67, 45, 187°)
- ISCC–NBS descriptor: Brilliant bluish green
- B: Normalized to [0–255] (byte)

Verdigris on Fontana del Nettuno in Florence, Italy

Verdigris (/ˈvɜːrdɪɡriː(s)/) is a common name for any of a variety of somewhat toxic copper salts of acetic acid, which range in colour from green to a bluish-green depending on their chemical composition. Once used as a medicine and pharmaceutical preparation, verdigris occurs naturally, creating a patina on copper, bronze, and brass, and is the main component of a historic green pigment used for artistic purposes from antiquity until the late 20th century, including in easel painting, polychromatic sculptures, and illumination of maps. However, due to its instability, its popularity declined as other green pigments became readily available. The instability of its appearance stems from its hydration level and basicity, which change as the pigment interacts with other materials over time.

== History ==
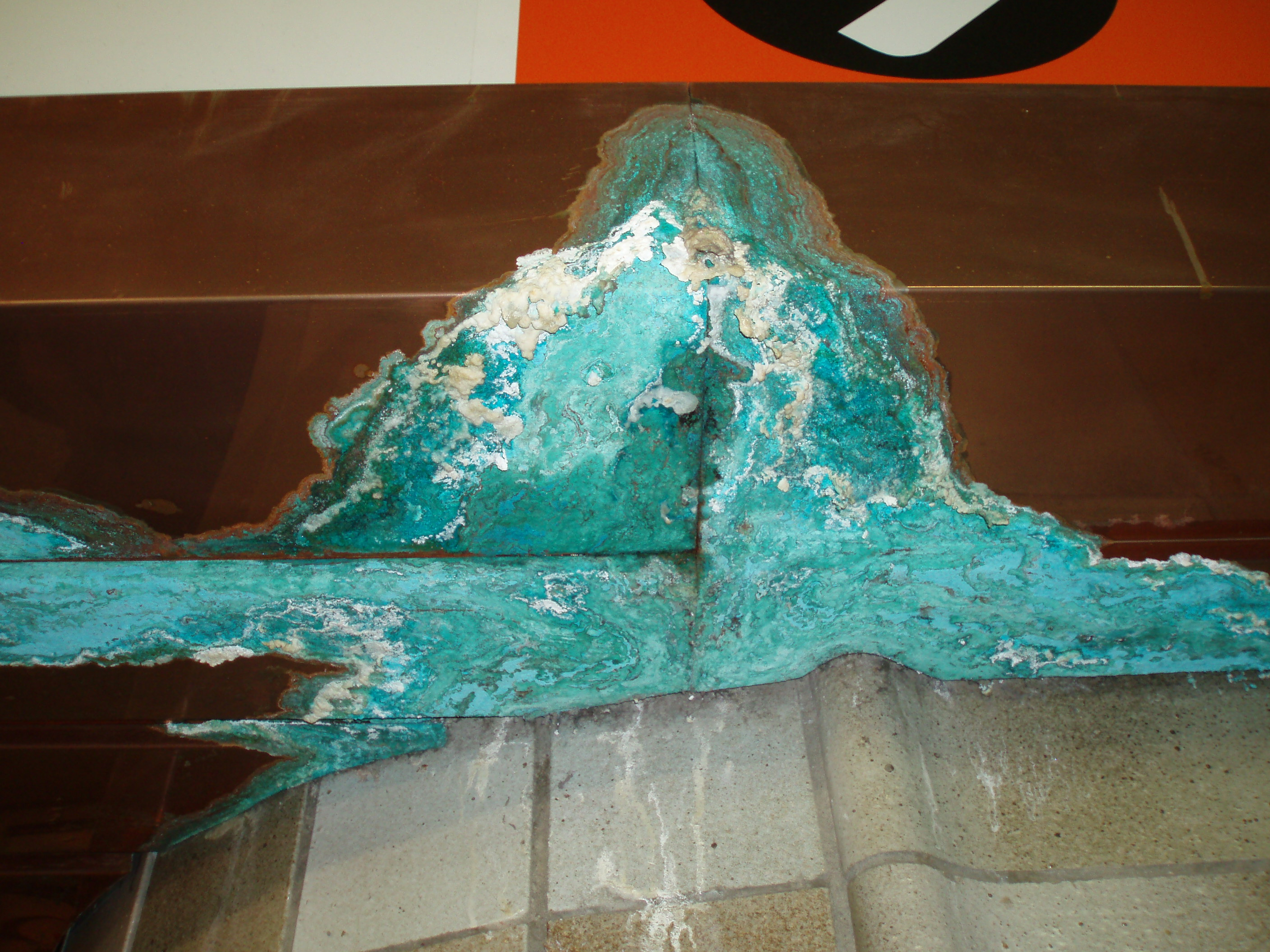
Naturally occurring verdigris on exposed metal in the Prague Metro.

=== Etymology ===
The name verdigris comes from the Middle English vertegrez, from the Old French verte grez. According to one view, it comes from vert d'aigre, "green [made by action] of vinegar". The modern French writing of this word is vert-de-gris ("green of grey"), sounding like the older name verdet gris ("grey greenish"), itself a deformation of verte grez. It was used as a pigment in paintings and other art objects (as green color), mostly imported from Greece, and hence it is more usually given another etymology as vert-de-Grèce ("green of Greece").

=== Production ===
Copper(II) acetate is prepared by treatment of copper(II) hydroxide with acetic acid. The historical methods used for producing verdigris have been recorded in artistic treaties, manuscripts on alchemy, works in natural history, and texts on medicine. The most common ingredients used were copper and vinegar. Throughout history, recipes changed. In the Middle Ages, copper strips were attached to a wooden block with acetic acid; the block was then buried in dung. A few weeks later, the block was to be dug up, and the verdigris scraped off. Another method of production was developed in 18th-century Montpellier, France, a locale which had the ideal climate to produce verdigris for pulverization. The industry there was long dominated by women, with verdigris manufactured in household cellars using copper plates stacked in clay pots that were filled with distilled wine. The acid in the grapes caused the copper to develop crystals. The crystals ripened into verdigris and were scraped off when matured. It was a profitable business, and 80% of production was sold abroad through certified female brokers. At the height of its popularity, in the 1710s, the government had to enforce inspection systems to address growing fraudulent practices. By the 20th century, the production of verdigris had moved away from Montpellier and more cost-efficient methods of producing green pigments sent the industry into decline after WWI.

== Chemical composition ==
Verdigris is a collective term for copper acetate, whose chemical varieties produce different hues. The technical literature is inconsistent in describing these variations. Some sources refer to "neutral verdigris" as copper(II) acetate monohydrate (Cu(CH_{3}CO_{2})_{2}·(H_{2}O)) and to "blue verdigris" as Cu(CH_{3}CO_{2})_{2}·CuO·(H_{2}O)_{6}. Other sources describe the main copper salt in natural verdigris as Cu_{4}SO_{4}(OH)_{6} (brochantite). Still, other sources describe it as basic copper carbonate (Cu_{2}CO_{3}(OH)_{2}), or as Cu(CH_{3}CO_{2})_{2}·(Cu(OH)_{2})_{n} where n varies from 0 to 3. In marine environments, the main copper salt is tribasic copper chloride (Cu_{2}(OH)_{3}Cl).

Overall, variations of verdigris can be divided into two groups: basic verdigris and neutral verdigris. The difference in colour depends on the hydration level and degrees of basicity.

=== Toxicity ===
Verdigris, which was once used as a medicine and pharmaceutical preparation is mildly poisonous. Symptoms of toxicity include nausea, anemia and death, although widespread acquired immunity has been documented, as occurred with female workers in Montpellier. Nontoxic substitutes have been developed for some applications, such as art pigments.

== Uses ==
Verdigris is a naturally occurring protective layer on metals such as copper, brass, and bronze. In addition to being a desirable artistic effect, it has been used primarily as a pigment and in now-outdated medicinal preparations.

When burned, verdigris produces a green flame.

=== Pigment ===
Verdigris has been used as a pigment since antiquity, including in paintings in Rome and Pompeii. The use of verdigris continued into the Middle Ages, Renaissance and Baroque paintings. It has been identified in The Last Supper (1306) by Giotto. During the 15th and 16th centuries, it was used in paintings for its transparency and brilliance. It was difficult to create strong green colors in paintings due to the limitations of the existing green, yellow and blue pigments. In early Italian, Netherlandish, and German paintings, verdigris was widely used to create pure green tones for landscapes and drapery, such as the green coat of Saint John in the Mond Crucifixion by Raphael. Verdigris was used as both glaze and opaque paint. When verdigris glaze was combined with lead white or lead-tin yellow, it created a deeply saturated green. It was used in oil-based house paint for French and Dutch country houses. Verdigris also was used as an imitation of 'Chinese varnish' on European lacquer. However, during the 19th century, the use of verdigris began to decrease as alternatives such as Emerald Green and viridian became more popular.

==== Stability ====
As a pigment, verdigris is subject to colour change. The changes are most pronounced during the first month of exposure to air. The changes also depend on the type of binding agent and type of verdigris used. For example, changes are less pronounced with neutral verdigris in oil and egg tempera compared to basic verdigris. With aging, the green pigment in these applications will show signs of browning or darkening. For example, in Botticelli's The Mystical Nativity, from 1500, the blue-green costumes of the angels have darkened to a dark green colour.

Verdigris pigment is lightfast in oil paint, as numerous examples of 15th-century paintings show. However, its lightfastness and air resistance are very low in other media. Copper resinate, made from verdigris by boiling it in a resin, is not lightfast, even in oil paint. In the presence of light and air, green copper resinate becomes stable brown copper oxide. The browning mechanism is attributed to the transient formation of Cu(I) in the pigment and oil system. The reduction of Cu(II) into Cu(I) due to the release of a carboxylate, causes changes in the optical properties of pigment. Furthermore, linseed oil induces the transformation of the copper acetate bimetallic structure, and forms monomeric series. Dioxygen that reacts with partially decarboxylated dimers to form a peroxy-Cu dimer complex is responsible for the darkening of the pigment.

In previous literature on painting, verdigris has been described as unstable when combined with other pigments which leads to further deterioration. Due to the fickle nature of the pigment, it required special preparation of paint, carefully layered application, and immediate sealing with varnish to avoid rapid discoloration (but not in the case of oil paint). However, further scientific research suggests that the difficulties are less extreme than previously described. The pigment nonetheless has the ability to degrade cellulosic materials, such as paper. In terms of identification and reproduction, modern technology and reproducible synthesis procedures have been developed to be used for museums and collections to identify distinct verdigris phases in historical artworks. Certain components of historical verdigris pigments, copper(II) acetates, are partially irreproducible based on the given historical recipes.

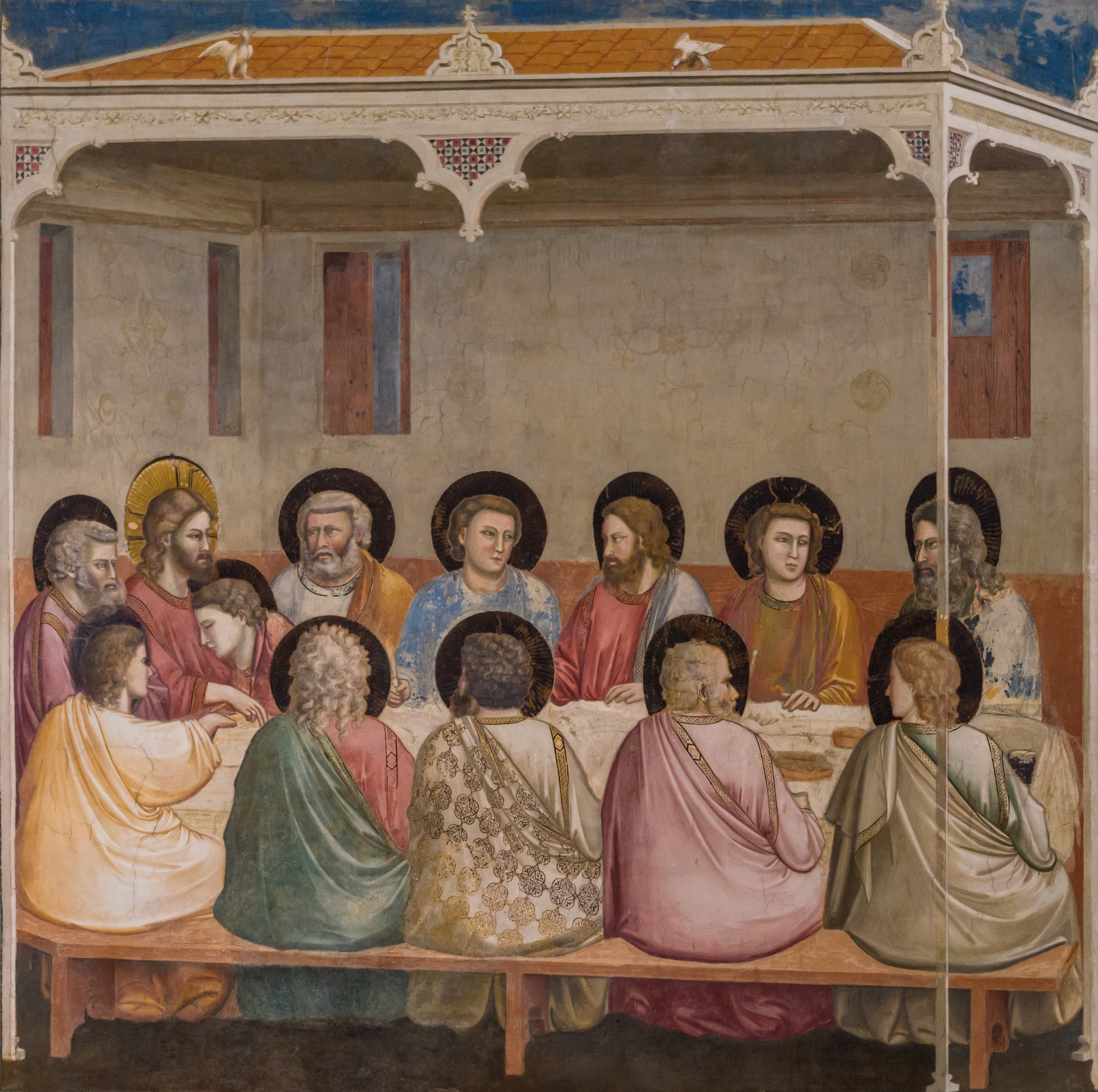
One of the earliest uses of verdigris as a pigment in painting; Last Supper (1306) by Giotto Di Bondone

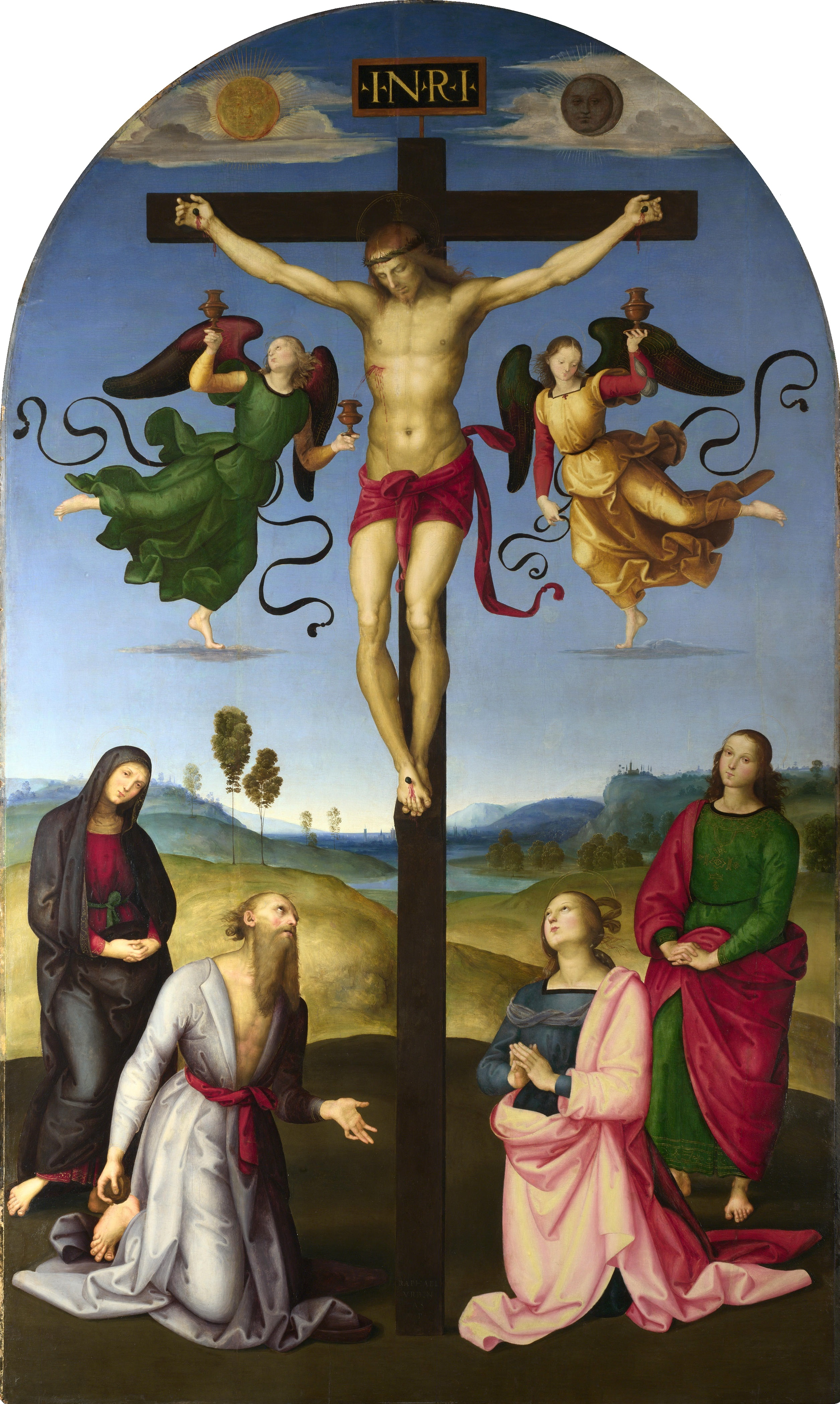
Raphael used verdigris for the green coat of Saint John, the left angel's frock, and other accents, in The Mond Crucifixion.

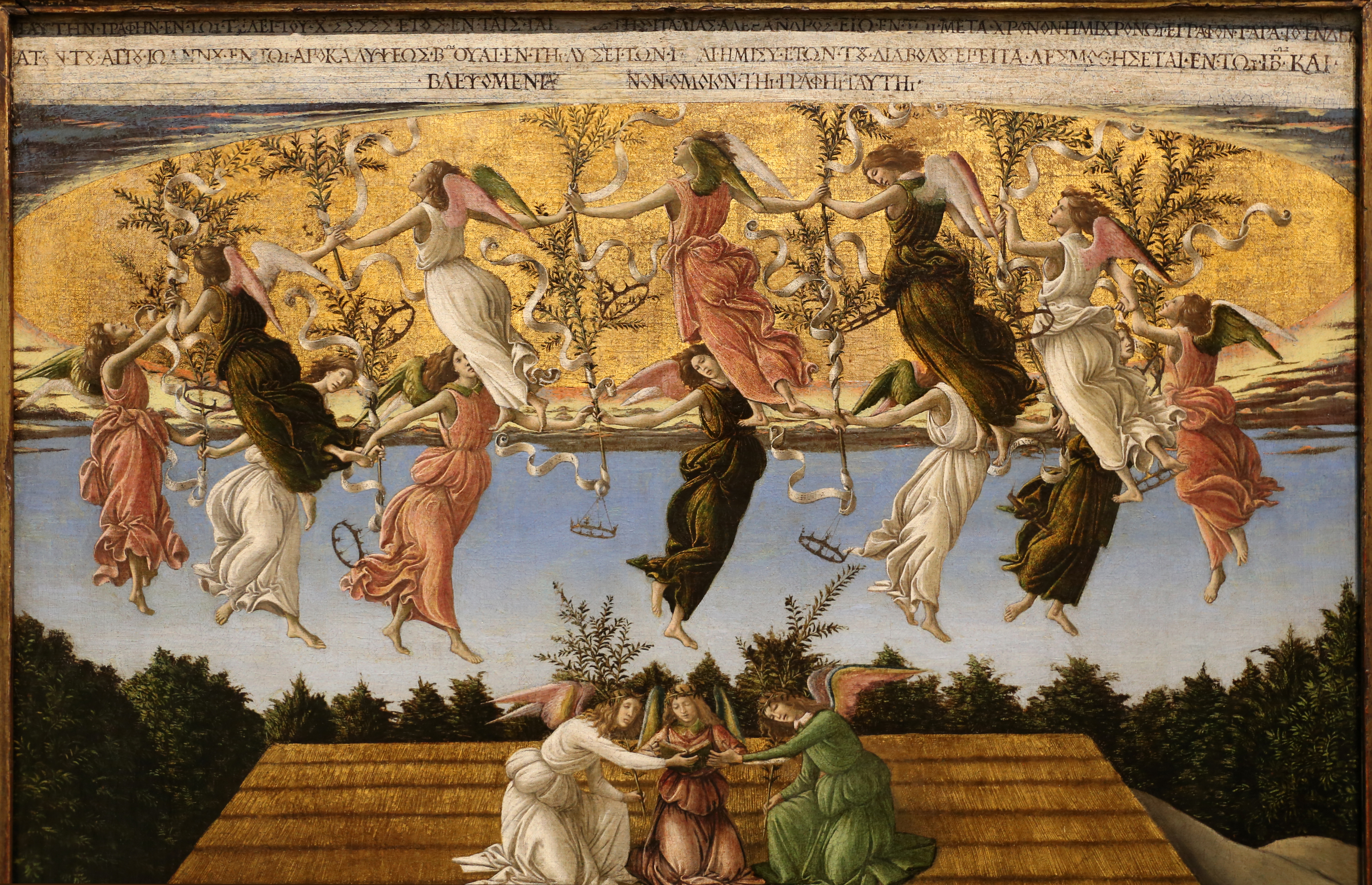
The Verdigris of the angels' costumes in Nativita Mistica by Botticelli darkened from bluish green to foliage green.

=== Medicine ===
Verdigris has also been used in medicine, and is identified in the Pharmacologia of John Ayrton Paris as the healing rust of the Spear of Telephus mentioned by Homer. Verdigris solids were also used for pharmaceutical preparations in the 18th century to treat canker sores.

== See also ==
- Bronze disease
- Green pigments
- List of colors
- List of inorganic pigments
- Patina
