= Caput mortuum (pigment) =

Historical purple pigment

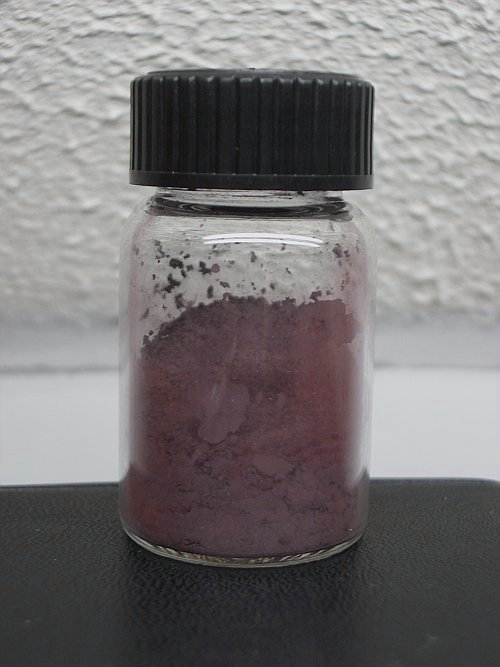
Ferric oxide

Caput mortuum (Latin for 'dead head', and variously spelled caput mortum or caput mortem), also known as cardinal purple, is the name given to a purple variety of hematite iron oxide pigment, used in oil paints and paper dyes. Due to the cultural significance of its deep purple colour, it was popular for painting the robes of religious figures and important personages (e.g. art patrons), with its popularity peaking in the 18th and 19th centuries.

The name for this pigment may have come from the alchemical usage, since iron oxide (rust) is a useless residue (caput mortuum) of oxidization. It was originally a byproduct of sulfuric acid manufacture during the 17th and 18th centuries, and was possibly an early form of the copperas process used for the manufacture of Venetian red and copperas red.
