= Titanium yellow =

Nickel antimony titanium yellow pigment

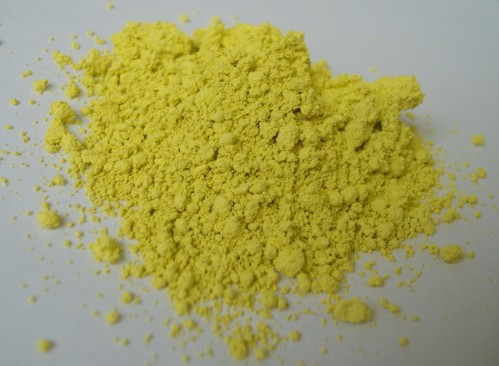
- Commercial pigment

Color coordinates
- Hex triplet: #EEE600
- sRGB^{B} (r, g, b): (238, 230, 0)
- HSV (h, s, v): (58°, 100%, 93%)
- CIELCh_{uv} (L, C, h): (89, 98, 83°)
- B: Normalized to [0–255] (byte)

Titanium yellow
Names
- IUPAC name: Titanium yellow; nickel antimony titanium yellow; nickel antimony titanium yellow rutile; CI Pigment Yellow 53; C.I. 77788

Identifiers
CAS Number	8007-18-9
3D model (JSmol)	Interactive image
ECHA InfoCard	100.029.410
EC Number	232-353-3
CompTox Dashboard (EPA)	DTXSID7029295
- InChI: InChI=1S/Ni.44O.2Sb.20Ti.12H/q+2;44*-2;2*+3;20*+4;;;;;;;;;;;; Key: KTGGHEZYKTWVFJ-UHFFFAOYSA-N
- SMILES: [O-2].[O-2].[O-2].[O-2].[O-2].[O-2].[O-2].[O-2].[O-2].[O-2].[O-2].[O-2].[O-2].[O-2].[O-2].[O-2].[O-2].[O-2].[O-2].[O-2].[O-2].[O-2].[O-2].[O-2].[O-2].[O-2].[O-2].[O-2].[O-2].[O-2].[O-2].[O-2].[O-2].[O-2].[O-2].[O-2].[O-2].[O-2].[O-2].[O-2].[O-2].[O-2].[O-2].[O-2].[Ni+2].[Sb+3].[Sb+3].[Ti+4].[Ti+4].[Ti+4].[Ti+4].[Ti+4].[Ti+4].[Ti+4].[Ti+4].[Ti+4].[Ti+4].[Ti+4].[Ti+4].[Ti+4].[Ti+4].[Ti+4].[Ti+4].[Ti+4].[Ti+4].[Ti+4].[Ti+4]

Properties
Chemical formula	NiO·Sb_{2}O_{3}·20TiO_{2}
Appearance	Yellow pigment
- Except where otherwise noted, data are given for materials in their standard state (at 25 °C [77 °F], 100 kPa). Infobox references

Titanium yellow is a yellow pigment with the chemical composition NiO·Sb_{2}O_{3}·20TiO_{2}. It is considered a complex inorganic color pigment (CICP), formerly known as a mixed phase metal oxide. The pigment has a rutile crystal lattice, with 2–5% of titanium ions replaced with nickel(II) and 9–12% of them replaced with antimony(III).

== Properties ==
Titanium yellow has a melting point above 1000 °C and extremely low solubility in water.

As other CICPs, it has excellent heat stability and good chemical stability.

== Production ==
CICPs such as titanium yellow are manufactured by calcining fine powders of metal oxides, hydroxides, or carbonates in solid state at temperatures between 650 and 1300 °C.

== Use ==
Titanium yellow is used primarily as a pigment for plastics and ceramic glazes, and in art painting.

It also finds use in high-end applications such as automotive and coil coatings.

== Safety ==
While titanium yellow contains antimony and nickel, it is considered relatively inert and can be regarded as "physiologically and environmentally harmless."

== See also ==
- List of colors
- List of inorganic pigments
