= Celadonite =

Mica mineral in the celadonite subgroup

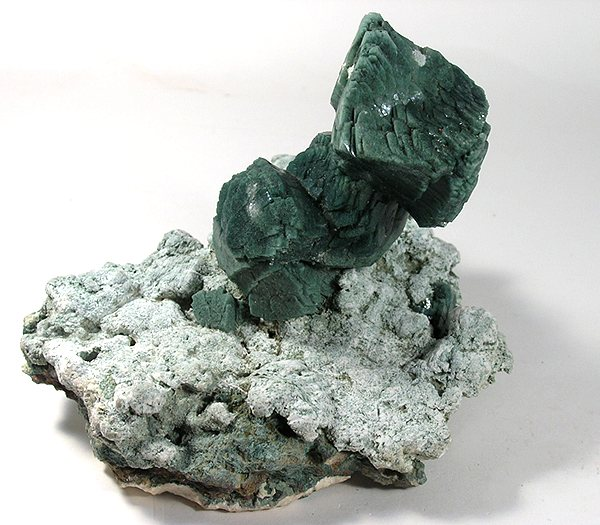
- Green crystals of heulandite which owe their green colour to many tiny inclusions of celadonite

General
- Category: Phyllosilicate minerals
- Group: Mica group, dioctahedral mica group, celadonite subgroup
- Formula: K(MgFe^{3+}◻)(Si_{4}O_{10})(OH)_{2}
- IMA symbol: Cel
- Crystal system: Monoclinic
- Crystal class: Spheroidal (2) (same H-M symbol)
- Space group: C2

Identification
- Color: Blue-green to olive to applegreen
- Cleavage: Perfect on {001}
- Tenacity: Fragile
- Mohs scale hardness: 2
- Luster: Waxy, dull, earthy
- Diaphaneity: Translucent
- Specific gravity: 2.95 – 3.05
- Density: 2.95 – 3.05
- Optical properties: Biaxial (−)
- Pleochroism: Visible
- 2V angle: 5° – 8°
- Common impurities: Mn, Na, Ca
- Other characteristics: Radioactive 9.11% (K)

Celadonite is a mica group mineral, a phyllosilicate of potassium, iron in both oxidation states, aluminium and hydroxide with formula K(MgFe^{3+}◻)(Si_{4}O_{10})(OH)_{2}.

It crystallizes in the monoclinic system and usually forms massive aggregates of prismatic crystallites or, more commonly, in dull clay masses. It is soft with a Mohs hardness of 2 and a specific gravity of 3. It forms vesicle fillings and linings in altered basaltic lavas. Early research suggests this mineral has ties to weakly metamorphosed plutonic rocks during formation, and is also found with montmorillonite clays or zeolite crystals. Association with zeolites may indicate these minerals favor the same underlying conditions of crystal growth.

It was first described in 1847 on Monte Baldo, near Verona, Italy. The name is from the French celadon, for sea-green. It is one of two minerals, along with glauconite, used in making the pigment known as green earth, which was an important pigment for the decoration of Joseon buildings (so much so that the only site which produces celadonite in South Korea is a designated natural monument).

Common impurities are manganese, calcium and sodium (previously known as natrium).
