= Sven Rinman =

Swedish chemist and mineralogist

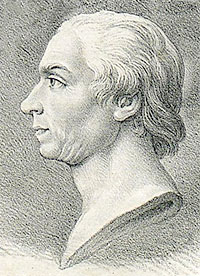
- Lithography
- Born: 23 June 1720; Uppsala, Sweden
- Died: 20 December 1792 (aged 72); Eskilstuna, Sweden
- Known for: discovery of cobalt green

Sven Rinman (23 June (N.S)/12 June (O.S) 1720 – 20 December 1792) was a Swedish chemist and mineralogist who discovered the pigment cobalt green, sometimes also called Rinman's green. He had a great influence on mining and the steel production in Sweden.

== Life and work ==
Rinman was born in Uppsala on 23 June(N.S) 1720. At the age of 20 he became an intern at the Royal Bureau of Mines. In the years 1746 and 1747 Rinman visited several European countries to improve his knowledge on mining and metallurgy. After his return he became inspector in several mines and metal works. His research on mining and metallurgy had a big influence on the Swedish industry. He was elected a member of the Royal Swedish Academy of Sciences in 1753. His two most widely used books Bergwerks lexicon(1788–89) (Mining lexicon) and Afhandling rörande mechaniquen (1794) (Treatise on Mechanics), which was published by his son Carl after his death, became standard for mining engineers in Sweden.
