= Cobalt green =

Cobalt green is an ambiguous term for either of two families of green inorganic pigments. Both are obtained by doping cobalt(II) oxide into colorless host oxides.

== Spinel-based cobalt green ==
Doping Co(II) into Mg(II) and Zn(II) sites of Mg_{2}TiO_{4} and Zn_{2}TiO_{4}, respectively gives one family of cobalt greens. These materials adopt the spinel structure.

== Rinman's green ==
Rinman's green
Names
- Other names: Cinnabar green; Turquoise green; Rinman's green; Rinmann's green; Zinc green

Properties
Chemical formula	Zn_{1−x}Co_{x}O
Solubility in water	Insoluble
- Except where otherwise noted, data are given for materials in their standard state (at 25 °C [77 °F], 100 kPa). Infobox references

Rinman's green, also referred to as Rinmann's green, is obtained by doping cobalt(II) oxide into zinc oxide. Sven Rinman, a Swedish chemist, discovered this compound in 1780. Zinc oxide–derived pigments have been used in many industries and processes. It is rarely used because it is a weak chromophore and relatively expensive compared to chromium(III) oxide.

The structure and color of compositions Zn_{1−x}Co_{x}O depends on the value of x. For x ≤ 0.3, the material adopts the Wurtzite structure (of ZnO) and is intensely green. For x ≥ 0.7, the material has the sodium chloride structure (of CoO) and is pink. Intermediate values of x give a mixture of the two phases.

Cobalt green has been tested for use in "spintronic" devices. Cobalt green is attractive in this application because it is magnetic at room temperature.

== See also ==
- Cobalt blue
- List of inorganic pigments
