= Cerium uranium blue =

Cerium uranium blue is the name given to solid solutions of cerium(IV) oxide, CeO_{2}, and uranium(IV) oxide, UO_{2}, of variable composition from 0 to 100% uranium.

== Synthesis and properties ==
Cerium uranium blue was first obtained by heating together cerium sulfate and uranyl sulfate with an excess of magnesium chloride at high temperature. The composition of the product was somewhat variable, approximating to 2CeO_{2}.UO_{2}. A similar product was obtained when ammonia was added to a solution containing uranyl nitrate and cerium(III) nitrate; the precipitate, initially yellow in colour, turned blue after a while. It is more conveniently made by heating together cerium(IV) oxide, CeO_{2}, and uranium(IV)oxide, UO_{2}, at 1000 °C for several days.

Both CeO_{2} and UO_{2} crystallize with the fluorite crystal structure. The lattice constants are very similar, 5.41 Å and 5.47 Å, respectively. Solid solutions can be made with uranium content from 0 to 100%. The lattice constant changes smoothly between the values for the two components as the composition changes. A similar series of solid solutions are formed between cerium(IV) oxide and thorium oxide.

The blue colour is due to an intense charge transfer transition when an electron is transferred from an orbital localized on uranium(IV), a mild reducing agent, to an orbital localized on cerium(IV), a strong oxidizing agent. Complete transfer would result in the production of uranium(VI) and cerium(III), the reverse of the reaction observed with the precipitate from aqueous solution.
