= Viridian =

Shade of bluish green

Color coordinates
- Hex triplet: #40826D
- sRGB^{B} (r, g, b): (64, 130, 109)
- HSV (h, s, v): (161°, 51%, 51%)
- CIELCh_{uv} (L, C, h): (50, 31, 160°)
- Source: Maerz and Paul
- ISCC–NBS descriptor: Moderate green
- B: Normalized to [0–255] (byte)

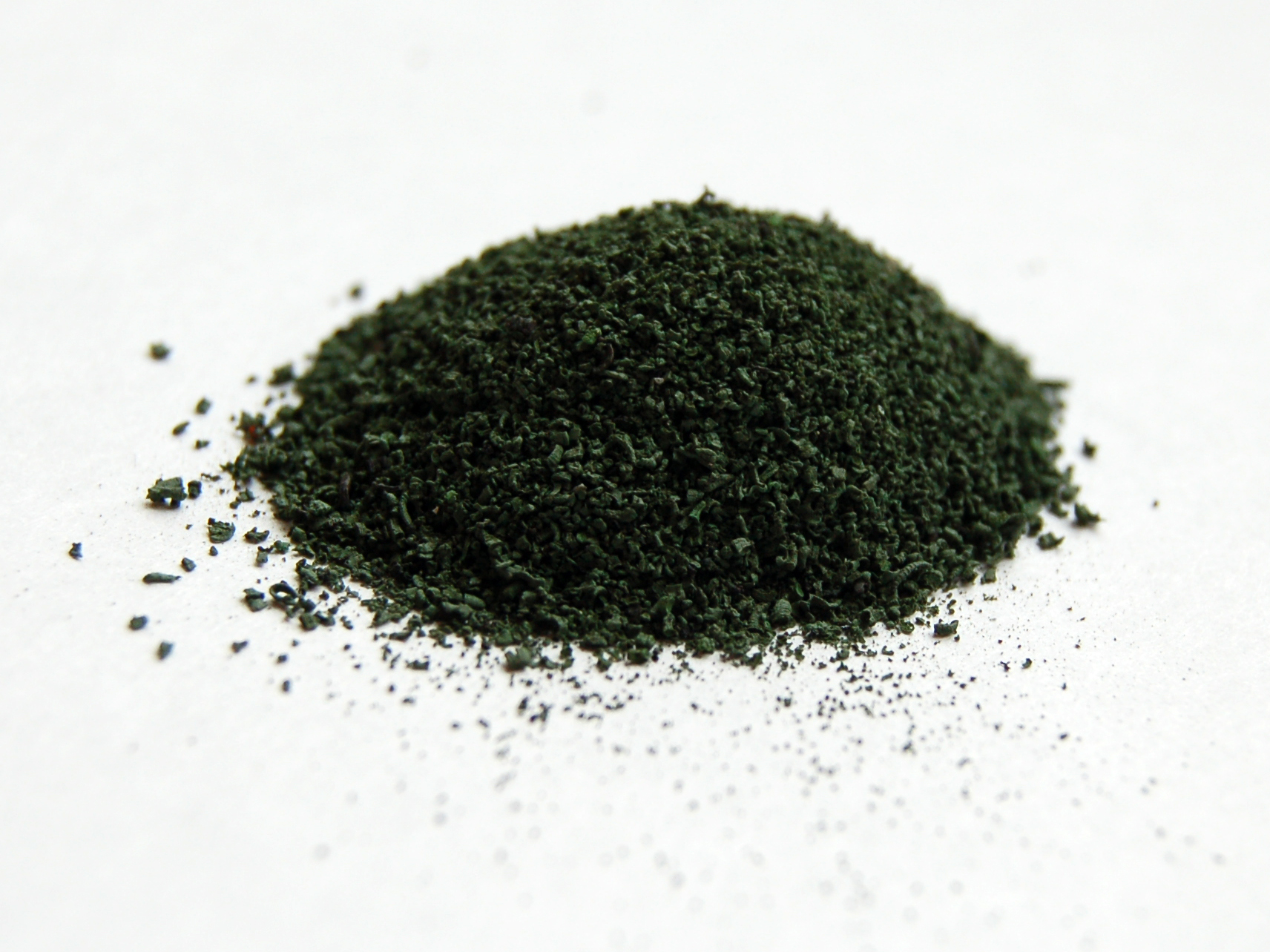
Chromium(III) oxide sample

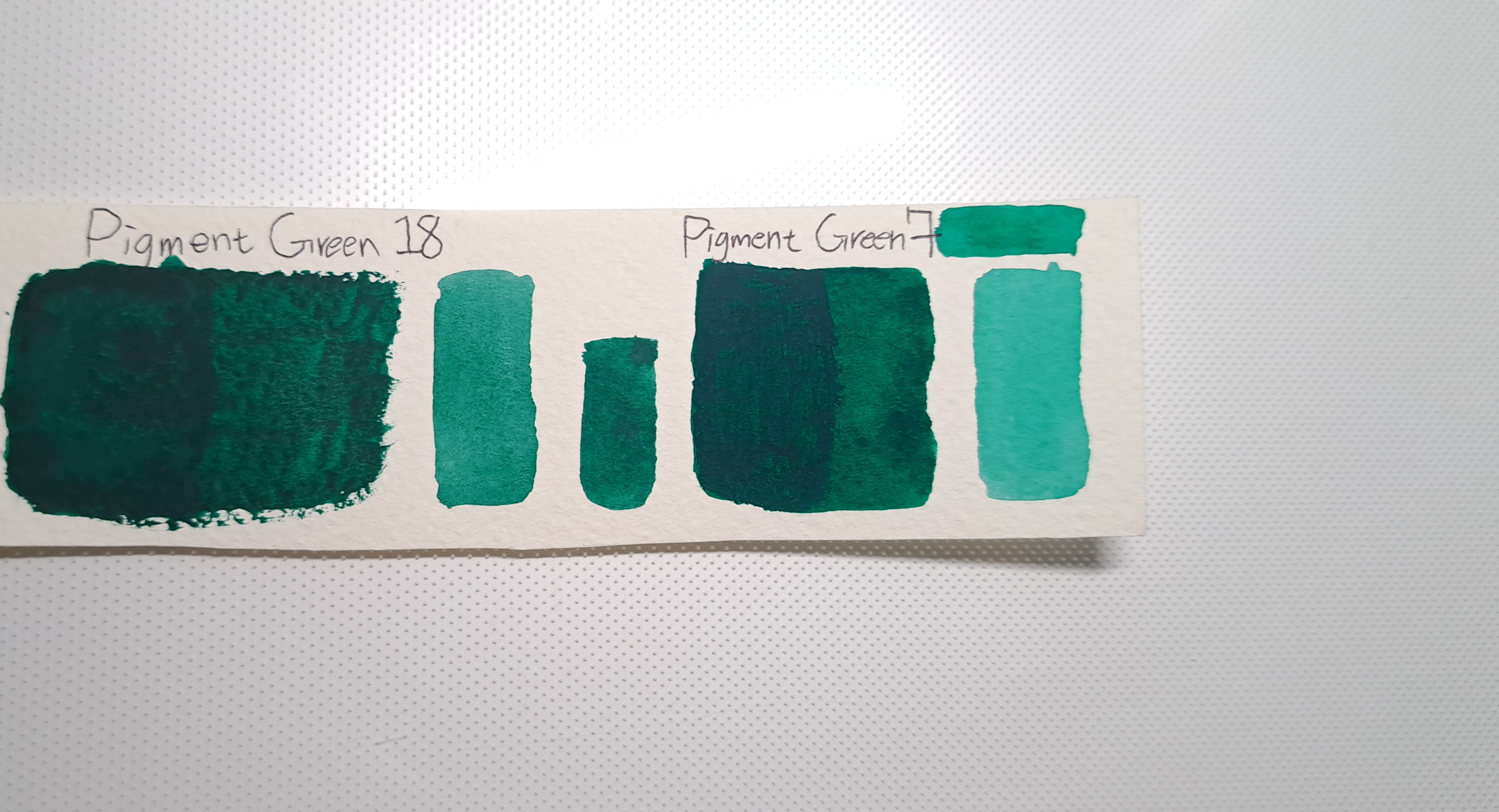
Viridian (Pigment Green 18), left 3 smears; and Phthalocyanine Green (Pigment Green 7), right 3 smears

Viridian is a blue-green pigment, a hydrated chromium(III) oxide, of medium saturation and relatively dark in value. It is composed of a majority of green, followed by blue. The first recorded use of viridian as a color name in English was in the 1860s. Viridian takes its name from the Latin viridis, meaning "green". The pigment was first prepared in mid-19th-century Paris and remains available from several US manufacturers as prepared artists' colors in all media.

== History ==
Viridian pigment was first prepared in 1838 in Paris by Parisian color chemist and painter Pannetier alongside his assistant Binet as a hydrated form of chromium oxide. The preparation process was demanding, expensive, and shrouded in secrecy. The French chemist C. E. Guignet developed and patented a cheaper manufacturing method in 1859 that enabled larger distribution and use of the pigment. This method involved calcining a combination of boric acid and potassium bichromate, then washing the material.

Winsor and Newton's catalogue listed the pigment as early as 1849. It was used as early as 1840 in a work by J. M. W. Turner. Viridian was in prominent use by the mid-nineteenth century, but was less popular than three to four times more affordable alternatives including emerald and chrome greens.

== Visual characteristics ==
Viridian is a bright shade of spring green, which places the color between green and teal on the color wheel, or, in paint, a tertiary blue–green color. Viridian is dark in value, has medium saturation, and is transparent.

== Variations of viridian ==
=== Paolo Veronese green ===
Paolo Veronese Green

Color coordinates
- Hex triplet: #009B7D
- sRGB^{B} (r, g, b): (0, 155, 125)
- HSV (h, s, v): (168°, 100%, 61%)
- CIELCh_{uv} (L, C, h): (57, 49, 163°)
- Source: Gallego and Sanz
- ISCC–NBS descriptor: Strong green
- B: Normalized to [0–255] (byte)

Paolo Veronese green is the color that is called verde veronés in the Guía de coloraciones (Guide to colorations) by Rosa Gallego and Juan Carlos Sanz, a color dictionary published in 2005 that is widely popular in the Hispanophone realm.

Paolo Veronese green was a color formulated and used by the noted 16th-century Venetian artist Paolo Veronese.

Paolo Veronese green began to be used as a color name in English sometime in the 1800s (exact year uncertain).

Another name for this color is transparent oxide of chromium.

=== Viridian green ===
Viridian Green

Color coordinates
- Hex triplet: #009698
- sRGB^{B} (r, g, b): (0, 150, 152)
- HSV (h, s, v): (181°, 100%, 60%)
- CIELCh_{uv} (L, C, h): (56, 45, 194°)
- ISCC–NBS descriptor: Moderate bluish green
- B: Normalized to [0–255] (byte)

At right is displayed the color viridian green.

=== Generic viridian ===
Generic Viridian

Color coordinates
- Hex triplet: #007F66
- sRGB^{B} (r, g, b): (0, 127, 102)
- HSV (h, s, v): (168°, 100%, 50%)
- CIELCh_{uv} (L, C, h): (47, 41, 163°)
- Source: Gallego and Sanz
- ISCC–NBS descriptor: Moderate green
- B: Normalized to [0–255] (byte)

Generic viridian is the color that is called Viridian inspecifico in the Guía de coloraciones (Guide to colorations) by Rosa Gallego and Juan Carlos Sanz, a color dictionary published in 2005 that is widely popular in the Hispanophone realm.

=== Spanish viridian ===
Spanish Viridian

Color coordinates
- Hex triplet: #007F5C
- sRGB^{B} (r, g, b): (0, 127, 92)
- HSV (h, s, v): (163°, 100%, 50%)
- CIELCh_{uv} (L, C, h): (47, 44, 154°)
- Source: Gallego and Sanz
- ISCC–NBS descriptor: Strong green
- B: Normalized to [0–255] (byte)

Spanish viridian is the color that is called Viridian specifico in the Guía de coloraciones (Guide to colorations) by Rosa Gallego and Juan Carlos Sanz, a color dictionary published in 2005 that is widely popular in the Hispanophone realm.

== Permanence ==
Viridian is considered durable and permanent as an artist's pigment. Viridian is unaffected by temperatures up to 260 °C (500 °F), but it is unsuitable for use in ceramic glazes. Viridian is compatible with all pigments in all media, and has high oil absorption. Pure pigment formulations of viridian are hard and may separate in tubes, but adding barium sulfate in small quantities enables easy grinding and dispersion.

== Notable occurrences ==
=== Fine art painting ===
- Fritz Bamberger, Afterglow in the Sierra Nevada, 1863.
- Claude Monet, Arrival of the Normandy Train, Gare Saint-Lazare, 1877, oil on canvas includes traces of viridian in the grassy area.
- Pierre-Auguste Renoir, Flowers, 1919.
Selected Paintings Containing Viridian
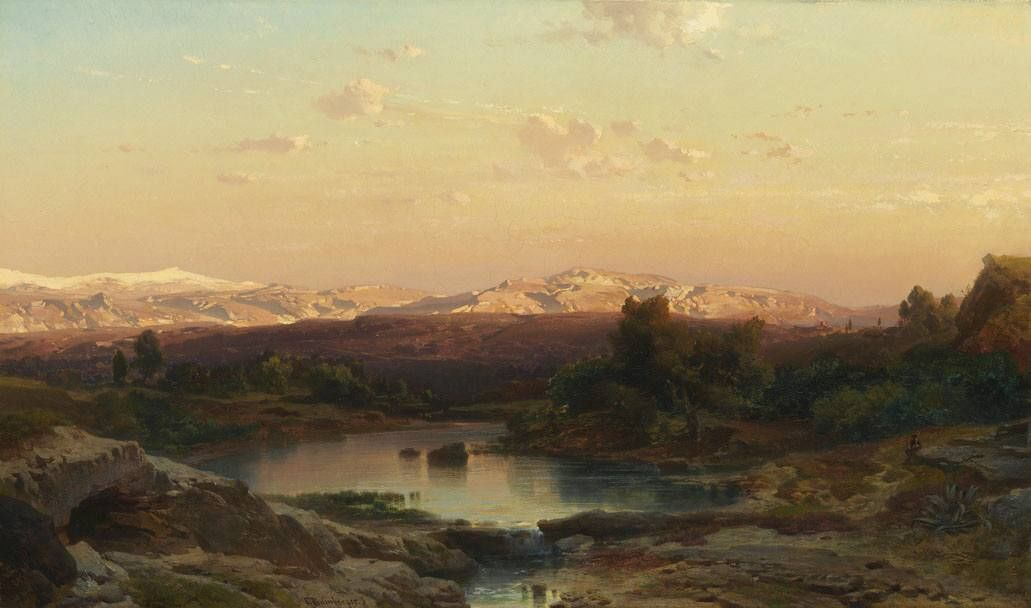
Fritz Bamberger - Ansicht der Sierra Nevada, 1863. Bavarian State Painting Collections

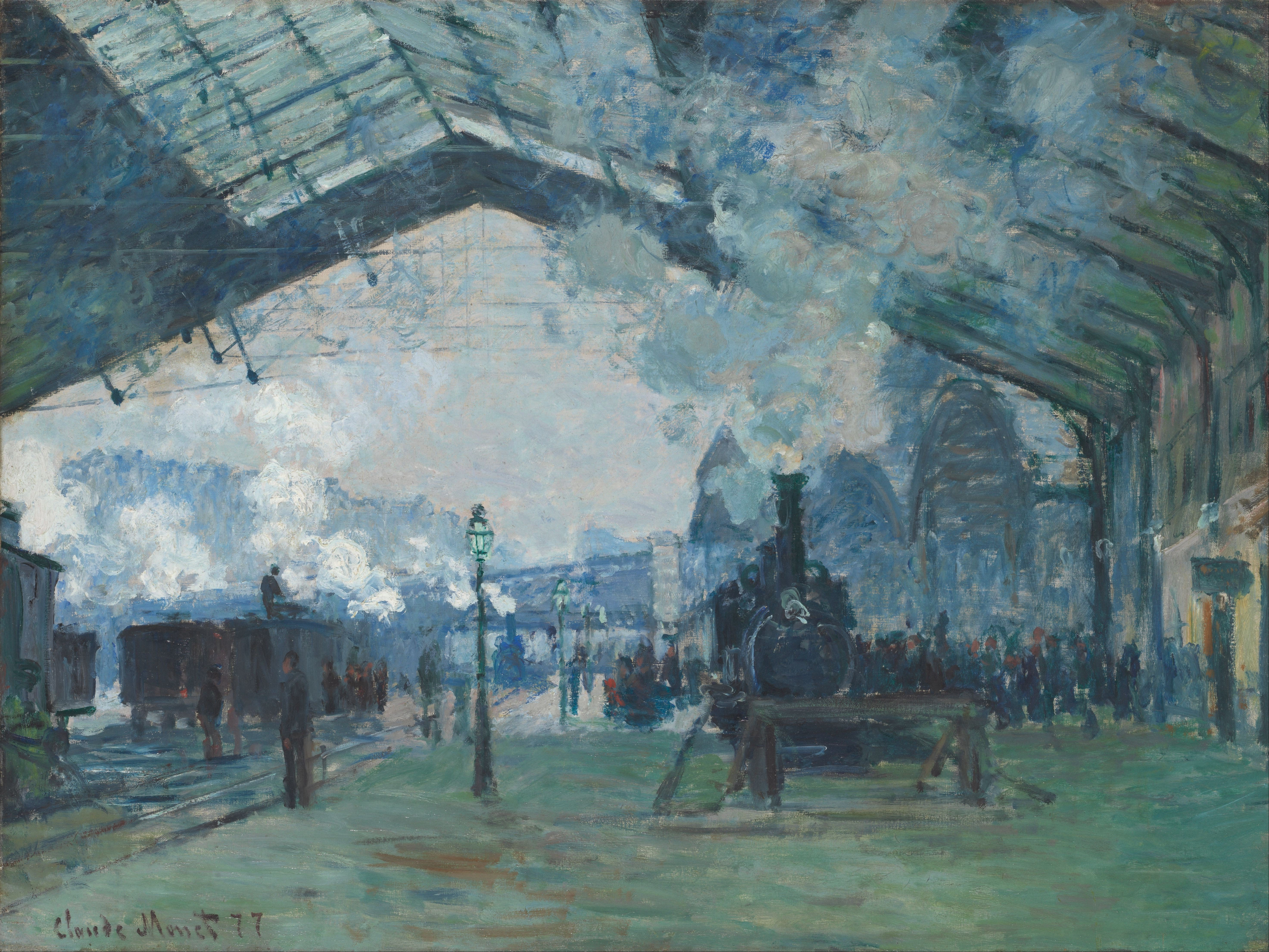
Claude Monet - Arrival of the Normandy Train, Gare Saint-Lazare, 1877, oil on canvas. Art Institute of Chicago

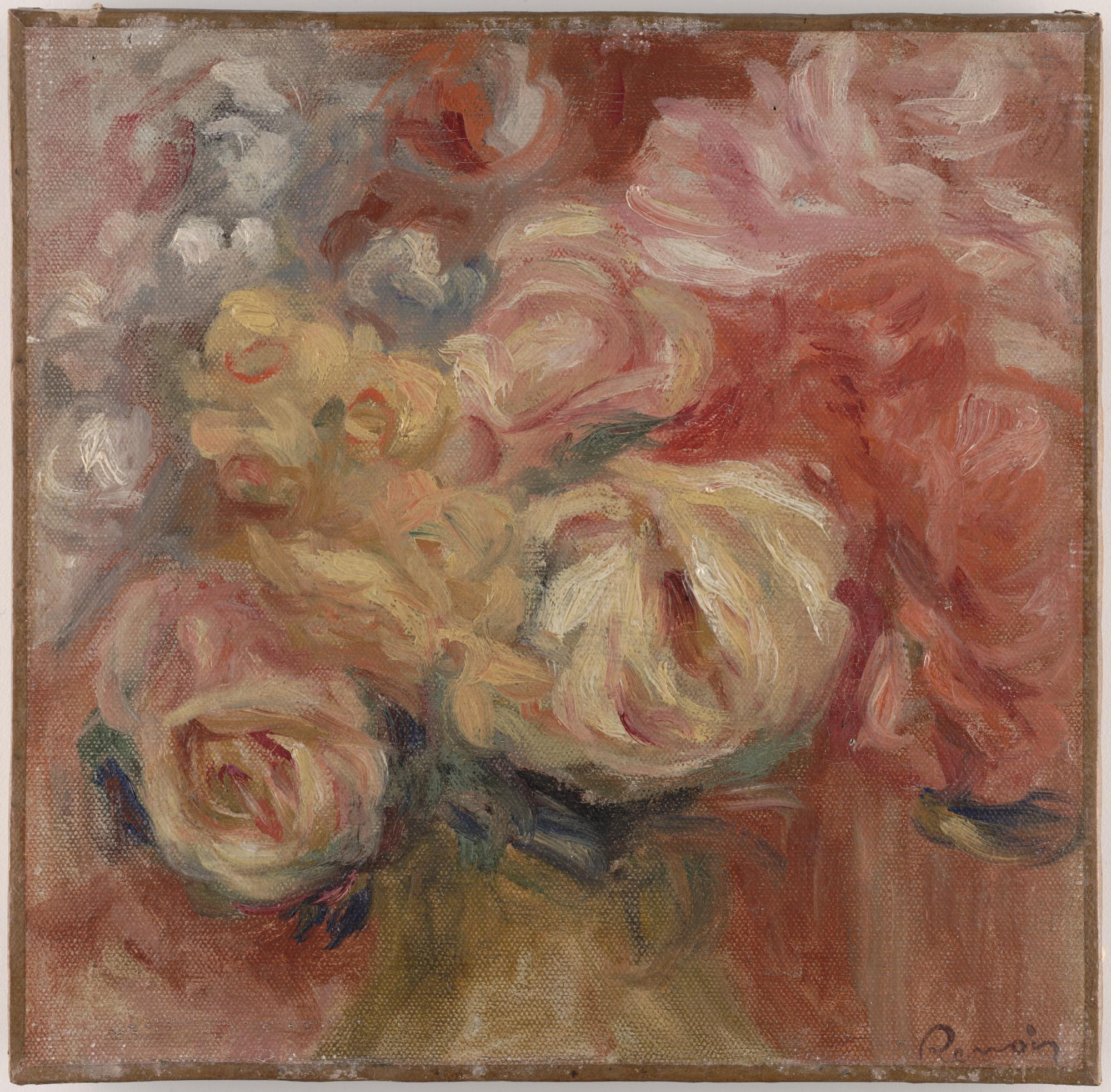
Renoir - Flowers, 1919

== See also ==
- List of colors
- List of inorganic pigments
- Green pigments
