= Caput mortuum =

Latin term and symbol used in alchemy

Alchemical symbol for caput mortuum

Caput mortuum (plural capita mortua; literally "dead head") is a Latin term used in alchemy to signify a useless substance left over from a chemical operation such as sublimation and the epitome of decline and decay (alternatively called nigredo). Alchemists represented this residue with a stylized human skull, a literal death's head.

The symbol shown on this page was also used in 18th-century chemistry to mean residue, remainder, or residuum. Caput mortuum was also sometimes used to mean crocus metallorum, i.e. brownish-red metallic compounds such as crocus martis (ferrous sulfate), and crocus veneris (copper oxidule).
