= Trioctylphosphine selenide =

Identifiers
CAS Number	20612-73-1
3D model (JSmol)	Interactive image
ChemSpider	10628283
EC Number	833-942-3
PubChem CID	12163534
- InChI: InChI=1S/C24H51PSe/c1-4-7-10-13-16-19-22-25(26,23-20-17-14-11-8-5-2)24-21-18-15-12-9-6-3/h4-24H2,1-3H3 Key: ZAKSIRCIOXDVPT-UHFFFAOYSA-N
- SMILES: CCCCCCCCP(=[Se])(CCCCCCCC)CCCCCCCC

Properties
Chemical formula	C_{24}H_{51}PSe
Molar mass	449.617 g·mol^{−1}
Appearance	white solid

Related compounds
Related compounds	Triphenylphosphine selenide
- Except where otherwise noted, data are given for materials in their standard state (at 25 °C [77 °F], 100 kPa). Infobox references

Trioctylphosphine selenide (TOPSe) is an organophosphorus compound with the formula SeP(C_{8}H_{17})_{3}. It is used as a source of selenium in the preparation of cadmium selenide. TOPSe is a white, air-stable solid that is soluble in organic solvents. The molecule features a tetrahedral phosphorus center.

== Preparation and use ==
TOPSe is usually prepared by oxidation of trioctylphosphine with elemental selenium:

P(C_{8}H_{17})_{3} + Se → SeP(C_{8}H_{17})_{3}

Often the reaction is conducted without the isolation of TOPSe.

As a solution with trioctylphosphine oxide, TOPSe reacts with dimethylcadmium to give cadmium selenide. The mechanism is proposed to proceed in two steps, beginning with the formation of cadmium metal followed by its oxidation with the TOPSe. Similarly it has been used to produce lead selenide.
