= Cadmium sulfide =

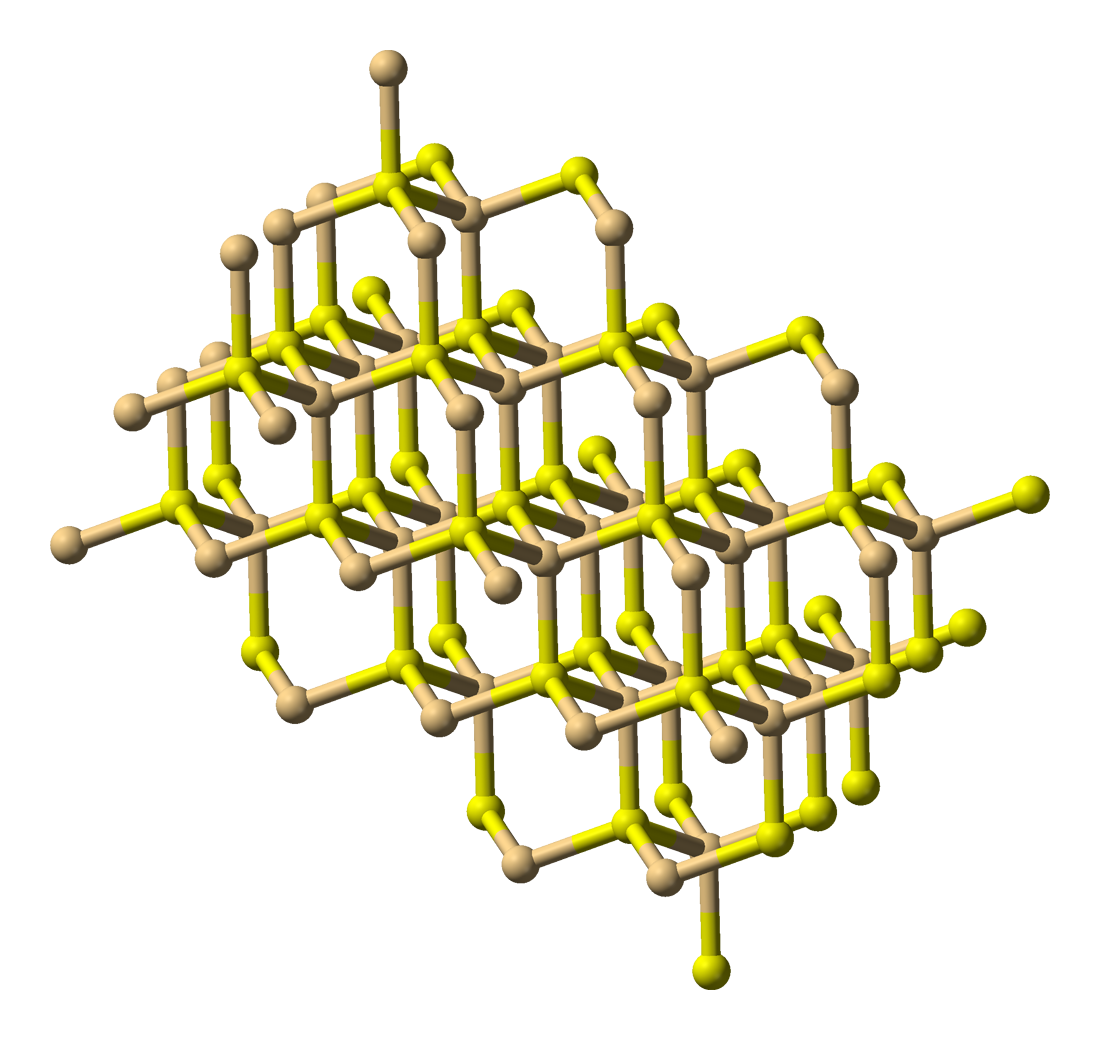
3D model of the structure of hawleyite
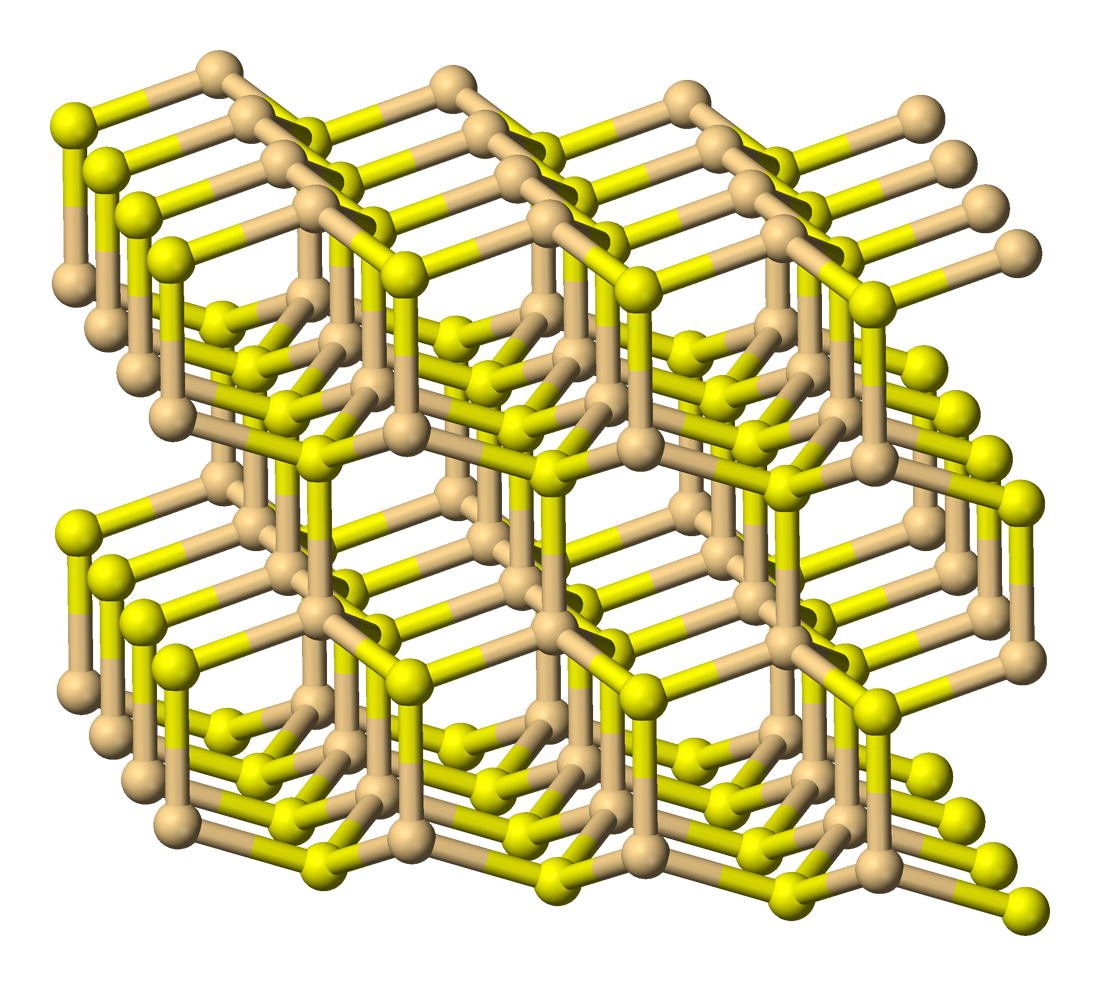
3D model of the structure of greenockite
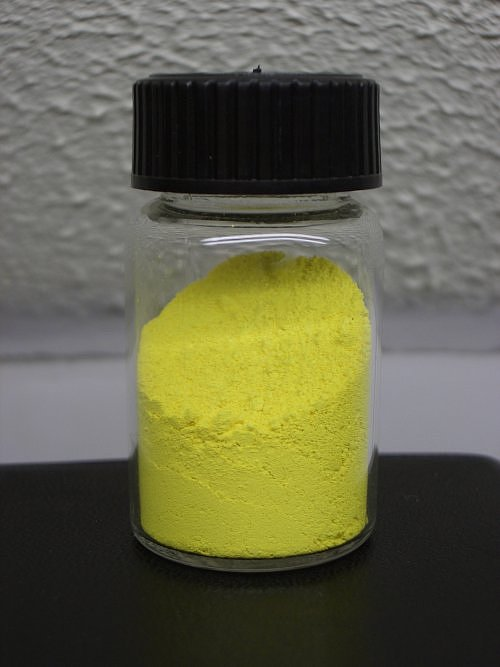

Names
- Other names cadmium(II) sulfide greenockite hawleyite cadmium yellow

Identifiers
CAS Number	1306-23-6
3D model (JSmol)	monomer: Interactive image; hawleyite: Interactive image; greenockite: Interactive image; greenockite: Interactive image
ChEBI	CHEBI:50833
ChemSpider	7969586
ECHA InfoCard	100.013.771
EC Number	215-147-8
Gmelin Reference	13655
PubChem CID	14783
RTECS number	EV3150000
UNII	057EZR4Z7Q
UN number	2570
CompTox Dashboard (EPA)	DTXSID30893280
- InChI: InChI=1S/Cd.S/q+2;-2 Key: FRLJSGOEGLARCA-UHFFFAOYSA-N; InChI=1/Cd.S/q+2;-2 Key: FRLJSGOEGLARCA-UHFFFAOYAL
- SMILES: monomer: [S-2].[Cd+2]; hawleyite: [SH+2]12[CdH2-2][SH+2]3[CdH2-2][SH+2]([CdH-2]14)[CdH-2]1[S+2]5([CdH-2]38)[Cd-2]26[SH+2]2[CdH-2]([S+2]4)[SH+2]1[CdH2-2][SH+2]3[CdH-2]2[S+2][CdH-2]([SH+2]6[CdH-2]([SH+2])[SH+2]68)[SH+2]([CdH2-2]6)[CdH-2]35; greenockite: [CdH2-2]1[S+2]47[CdH-2]2[S+2][CdH-2]3[S+2]8([CdH2-2][SH+2]([CdH2-2]4)[CdH2-2]6)[CdH-2]4[S+2][CdH-2]5[S+2]6([CdH2-2]6)[Cd-2]78[S+2]78[CdH-2]([SH+2]69)[SH+2]5[CdH2-2][SH+2]4[CdH-2]7[SH+2]3[CdH2-2][SH+2]2[CdH-2]8[SH+2]1[CdH2-2]9; greenockite: [CdH2-2]1[SH+2]([CdH2-2]6)[CdH2-2][SH+2]7[CdH-2]2[S+2][Cd-2]3([S+2][CdH-2]9[S+2]5)[S+2]18[Cd-2]45[S+2][CdH-2]5[SH+2]6[Cd-2]78[S+2]78[CdH2-2][SH+2]5[CdH2-2][S+2]4([CdH2-2][SH+2]9[CdH2-2]4)[CdH-2]7[S+2]34[CdH2-2][SH+2]2[CdH2-2]8

Properties
Chemical formula	CdS
Molar mass	144.47 g·mol^{−1}
Appearance	Yellow-orange to brown solid.
Density	4.826 g/cm^{3}, solid.
Melting point	1,750 °C (3,180 °F; 2,020 K) 10 MPa
Boiling point	980 °C (1,800 °F; 1,250 K) (sublimation)
Solubility in water	insoluble
Solubility	soluble in acid very slightly soluble in ammonium hydroxide
Band gap	2.42 eV
Magnetic susceptibility (χ)	−50.0·10^{−6} cm^{3}/mol
Refractive index (n_{D})	2.529

Structure
Crystal structure	Hexagonal, Cubic

Thermochemistry
Std molar entropy (S^{⦵}_{298})	65 J·mol^{−1}·K^{−1}
Std enthalpy of formation (Δ_{f}H^{⦵}_{298})	−162 kJ·mol^{−1}

Hazards
- GHS labelling
Pictograms	(GHS07: Exclamation mark) (GHS08: Health hazard)
Signal word	Danger
Hazard statements	H302, H341, H350, H361, H372, H413
Precautionary statements	P201, P202, P260, P264, P270, P273, P281, P301+P312, P308+P313, P314, P330, P405, P501
NFPA 704 (fire diamond)	3 0 0
Flash point	Non-flammable
- Lethal dose or concentration (LD, LC)
LD_{50} (median dose)	7080 mg/kg (rat, oral)
- NIOSH (US health exposure limits)
PEL (Permissible)	[1910.1027] TWA 0.005 mg/m^{3} (as Cd)
REL (Recommended)	Ca
IDLH (Immediate danger)	Ca [9 mg/m^{3} (as Cd)]
Safety data sheet (SDS)	ICSC 0404

Related compounds
Other anions	Cadmium oxide Cadmium selenide Cadmium telluride
Other cations	Zinc sulfide Mercury sulfide
- Except where otherwise noted, data are given for materials in their standard state (at 25 °C [77 °F], 100 kPa). verify (what is ?) Infobox references

Cadmium sulfide is the inorganic compound with the formula CdS. Cadmium sulfide is a yellow salt. It occurs in nature with two different crystal structures as the rare minerals greenockite and hawleyite, but is more prevalent as an impurity substituent in the similarly structured zinc ores sphalerite and wurtzite, which are the major economic sources of cadmium. As a compound that is easy to isolate and purify, it is the principal source of cadmium for all commercial applications. Its vivid yellow color led to its adoption as a pigment for the yellow paint "cadmium yellow" in the 1800s.

== Production ==
Cadmium sulfide can be prepared by the precipitation from soluble cadmium(II) salts with sulfide ion. This reaction has been used for gravimetric analysis and qualitative inorganic analysis.
The preparative route and the subsequent treatment of the product, affects the polymorphic form that is produced (i.e., cubic vs hexagonal). It has been asserted that chemical precipitation methods result in the cubic zincblende form.

Pigment production usually involves the precipitation of CdS, the washing of the solid precipitate to remove soluble cadmium salts followed by calcination (roasting) to convert it to the hexagonal form followed by milling to produce a powder. When cadmium sulfide selenides are required the CdSe is co-precipitated with CdS and the cadmium sulfoselenide is created during the calcination step.

Cadmium sulfide is sometimes associated with sulfate reducing bacteria.

=== Routes to thin films of CdS ===
Special methods are used to produce films of CdS as components in some photoresistors and solar cells. In the chemical bath deposition method, thin films of CdS have been prepared using thiourea as the source of sulfide anions and an ammonium buffer solution to control pH:

Cd^{2+} + H_{2}O + (NH_{2})_{2}CS + 2 NH_{3} → CdS + (NH_{2})_{2}CO + 2 NH_{4}^{+}

Cadmium sulfide can be produced using metalorganic vapour phase epitaxy (MOVPE) techniques by the reaction of dimethylcadmium with diethyl sulfide:

Cd(CH_{3})_{2} + Et_{2}S → CdS + CH_{3}CH_{3} + C_{4}H_{10}

Other methods to produce films of CdS include

- Sol–gel techniques
- Sputtering
- Electrochemical deposition
- Spraying with precursor cadmium salt, sulfur compound and dopant
- Screen printing using a slurry containing dispersed CdS

== Reactions ==
Cadmium sulfide can be dissolved in acids.

CdS + 2 HCl → CdCl_{2} + H_{2}S

When solutions of sulfide containing dispersed CdS particles are irradiated with light, hydrogen gas is generated:

H_{2}S → H_{2} + S Δ_{f}H = +9.4 kcal/mol

The proposed mechanism involves the electron/hole pairs created when incident light is absorbed by the cadmium sulfide followed by these reacting with water and sulfide:

Production of an electron–hole pair

CdS + hν → e^{−} + h^{+}

Reaction of electron

2e^{−} + 2H_{2}O → H_{2} + 2OH^{−}

Reaction of hole

2h^{+} + S^{2−} → S

== Structure and physical properties ==
Cadmium sulfide has, like zinc sulfide, two crystal forms. The more stable hexagonal wurtzite structure (found in the mineral Greenockite) and the cubic zinc blende structure (found in the mineral Hawleyite). In both of these forms the cadmium and sulfur atoms are four coordinate. There is also a high pressure form with the NaCl rock salt structure.

Cadmium sulfide is a direct band gap semiconductor (gap 2.42 eV). The proximity of its band gap to visible light wavelengths gives it a coloured appearance. As well as this obvious property, other properties result:

- The conductivity increases when irradiated (leading to uses as a photoresistor).
- When combined with a p-type semiconductor, CdS the core component of a photovoltaic (solar) cell. A CdS/Cu_{2}S solar cell was one of the first efficient cells to be reported (1954).
- When doped with, for example, Cu^{+} ("activator") and Al^{3+} ("coactivator"), CdS luminesces under electron beam excitation (cathodoluminescence) and is used as phosphor.
- Both polymorphs are piezoelectric, and the hexagonal is also pyroelectric.
- Electroluminescence
- CdS crystals can act as a gain medium in solid-state laser
- In thin-film form, CdS can be combined with other layers for use in certain types of solar cells. CdS was also one of the first semiconductor materials to be used for thin-film transistors (TFTs). However, interest in compound semiconductors for TFTs largely waned after the emergence of amorphous silicon technology in the late 1970s.
- Thin films of CdS can be piezoelectric and have been used as transducers that can operate at frequencies in the gigahertz region.
- Nanoribbons of CdS show a net cooling due to annihilation of phonons, during anti-Stokes luminescence at ~510 nm. As a result, a maximum temperature drop of 40 and 15 K has been demonstrated when the nanoribbons are pumped with a 514 or 532 nm laser.

== Applications ==
=== Pigment ===
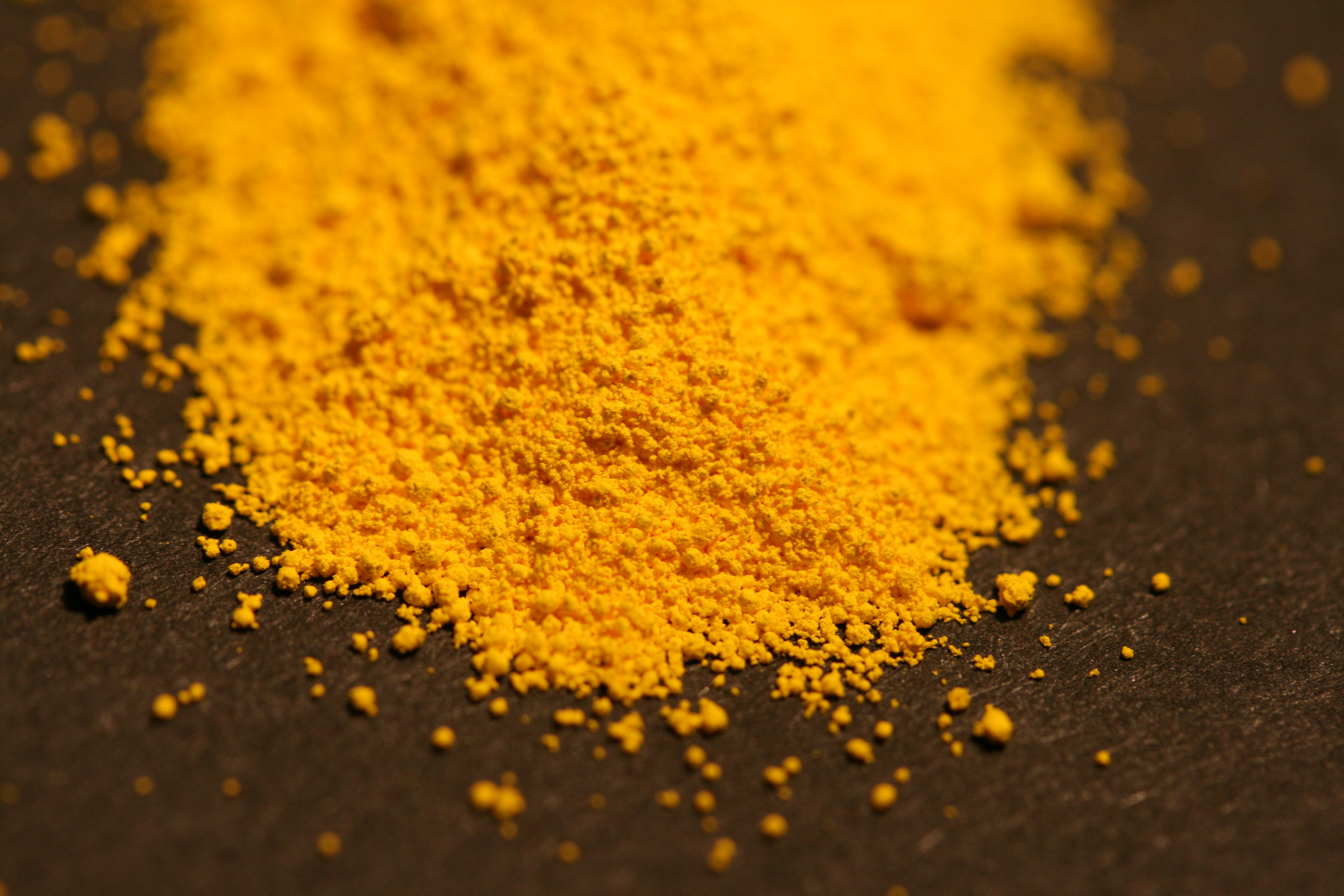
Yellow cadmium sulfide- pigment

CdS is used as pigment in plastics, showing good thermal stability, light and weather fastness, chemical resistance and high opacity. As a pigment, CdS is known as cadmium yellow (CI pigment yellow 37). About 2000 tons are produced annually as of 1982, representing about 25% of the cadmium processed commercially.

=== Historical use in art ===
The general commercial availability of cadmium sulfide from the 1840s led to its adoption by artists, notably Van Gogh, Monet (in his London series and other works) and Matisse (Bathers by a River 1916–1919). The presence of cadmium in paints has been used to detect forgeries in paintings alleged to have been produced prior to the 19th century.

=== CdS-CdSe solutions ===
CdS and CdSe form solid solutions with each other. Increasing amounts of cadmium selenide, gives pigments verging toward red, for example CI pigment orange 20 and CI pigment red 108.
Such solid solutions are components of photoresistors (light dependent resistors) sensitive to visible and near infrared light.

== Safety ==
Cadmium sulfide is toxic, especially dangerous when inhaled as dust, and cadmium compounds in general are classified as carcinogenic. Problems of biocompatibility have been reported when CdS is used as colors in tattoos. CdS has an LD_{50} of approximately 7,080 mg/kg in rats - which is higher than other cadmium compounds due to its low solubility.
