= Trioctylphosphine =

Names
- Preferred IUPAC name Tri(octyl)phosphane

Identifiers
CAS Number	4731-53-7
3D model (JSmol)	Interactive image
Beilstein Reference	1776995
ChemSpider	19625
ECHA InfoCard	100.022.940
PubChem CID	20851
UNII	VE0Y037UCN
CompTox Dashboard (EPA)	DTXSID9063582
- InChI: InChI=1S/C24H51P/c1-4-7-10-13-16-19-22-25(23-20-17-14-11-8-5-2)24-21-18-15-12-9-6-3/h4-24H2,1-3H3
- SMILES: CCCCCCCCP(CCCCCCCC)CCCCCCCC

Properties
Chemical formula	C_{24}H_{51}P
Molar mass	370.635498
Density	0.831 g/mL
Boiling point	284 to 291 °C (543 to 556 °F; 557 to 564 K) at 50 mmHg
- Except where otherwise noted, data are given for materials in their standard state (at 25 °C [77 °F], 100 kPa). Infobox references

Trioctylphosphine is an organophosphorus compound with the formula P(C_{8}H_{17})_{3} sometimes abbreviated TOP. It is usually encountered as a syrup. The compound is colorless.

== Reactions ==
Trioctylphosphine reacts with oxygen to form trioctylphosphine oxide. For this reason it is usually handled with air-free techniques.

TOP reacts with elemental selenium to give trioctylphosphine selenide (TOPSe), which is a reagent for the preparation of cadmium selenide and related semiconductors.

== See also ==
- Triphenylphosphine
- Trioctylphosphine oxide
