= Cadmium pigments =

Class of pigments that have cadmium as one of the chemical components

Cadmium red
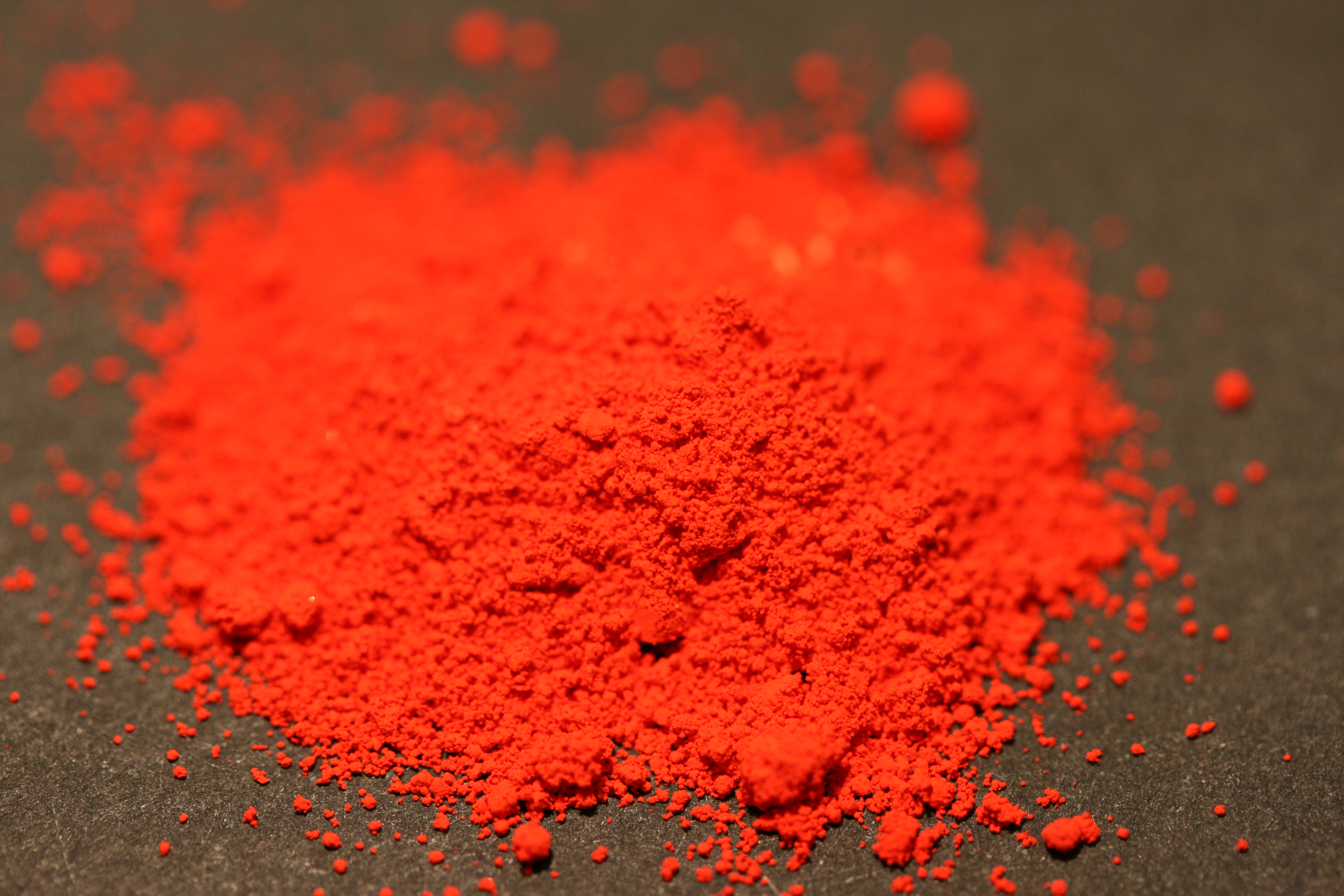
- Red cadmium pigment

Color coordinates
- Hex triplet: #E30022
- sRGB^{B} (r, g, b): (227, 0, 34)
- HSV (h, s, v): (351°, 100%, 89%)
- CIELCh_{uv} (L, C, h): (48, 155, 11°)
- Source: ColorHexa
- ISCC–NBS descriptor: Vivid reddish orange
- B: Normalized to [0–255] (byte)

Cadmium orange
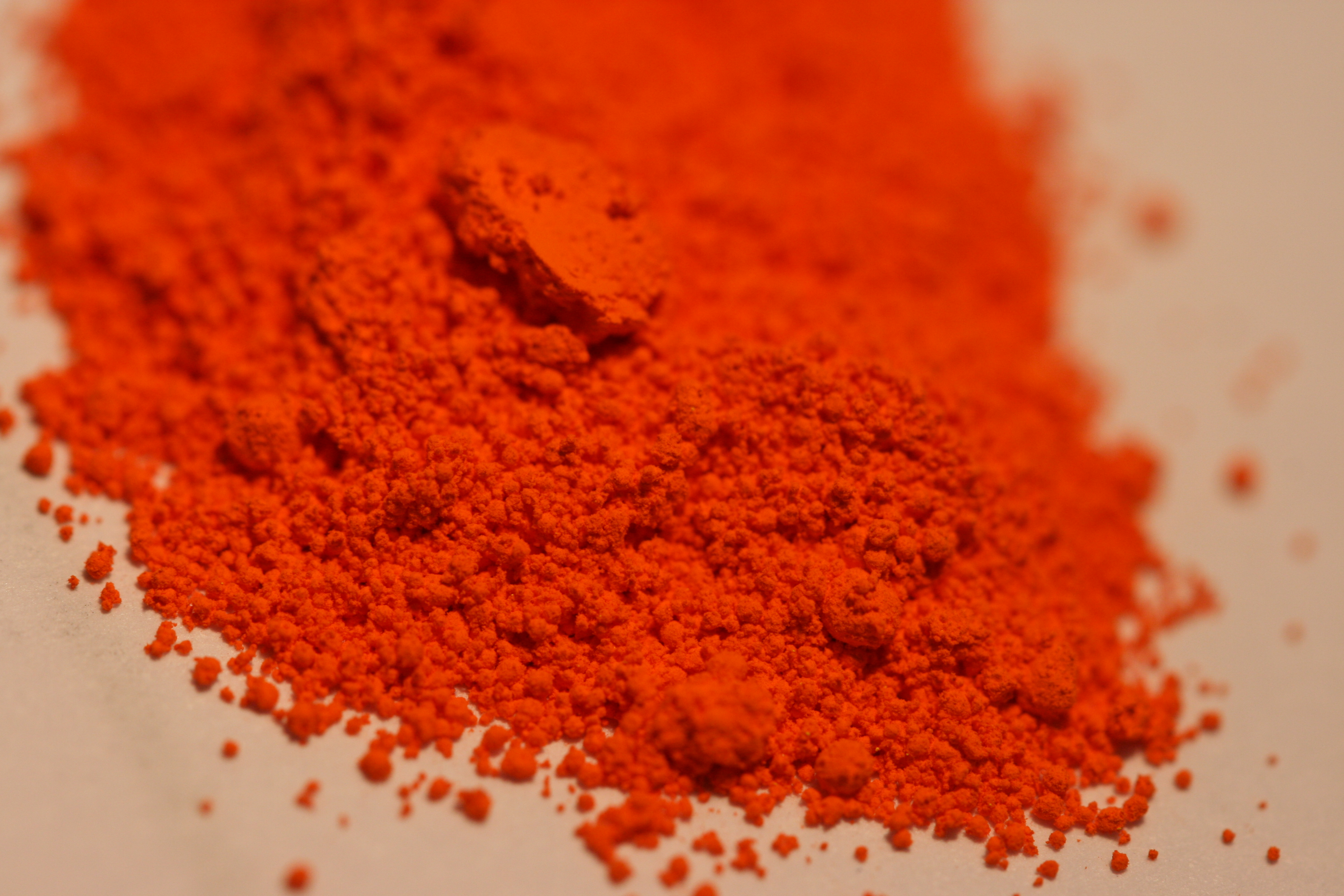
- Orange cadmium pigment

Color coordinates
- Hex triplet: #ED872D
- sRGB^{B} (r, g, b): (237, 135, 45)
- HSV (h, s, v): (28°, 81%, 93%)
- CIELCh_{uv} (L, C, h): (66, 101, 34°)
- Source: Charts
- ISCC–NBS descriptor: Strong orange
- B: Normalized to [0–255] (byte)

Cadmium yellow
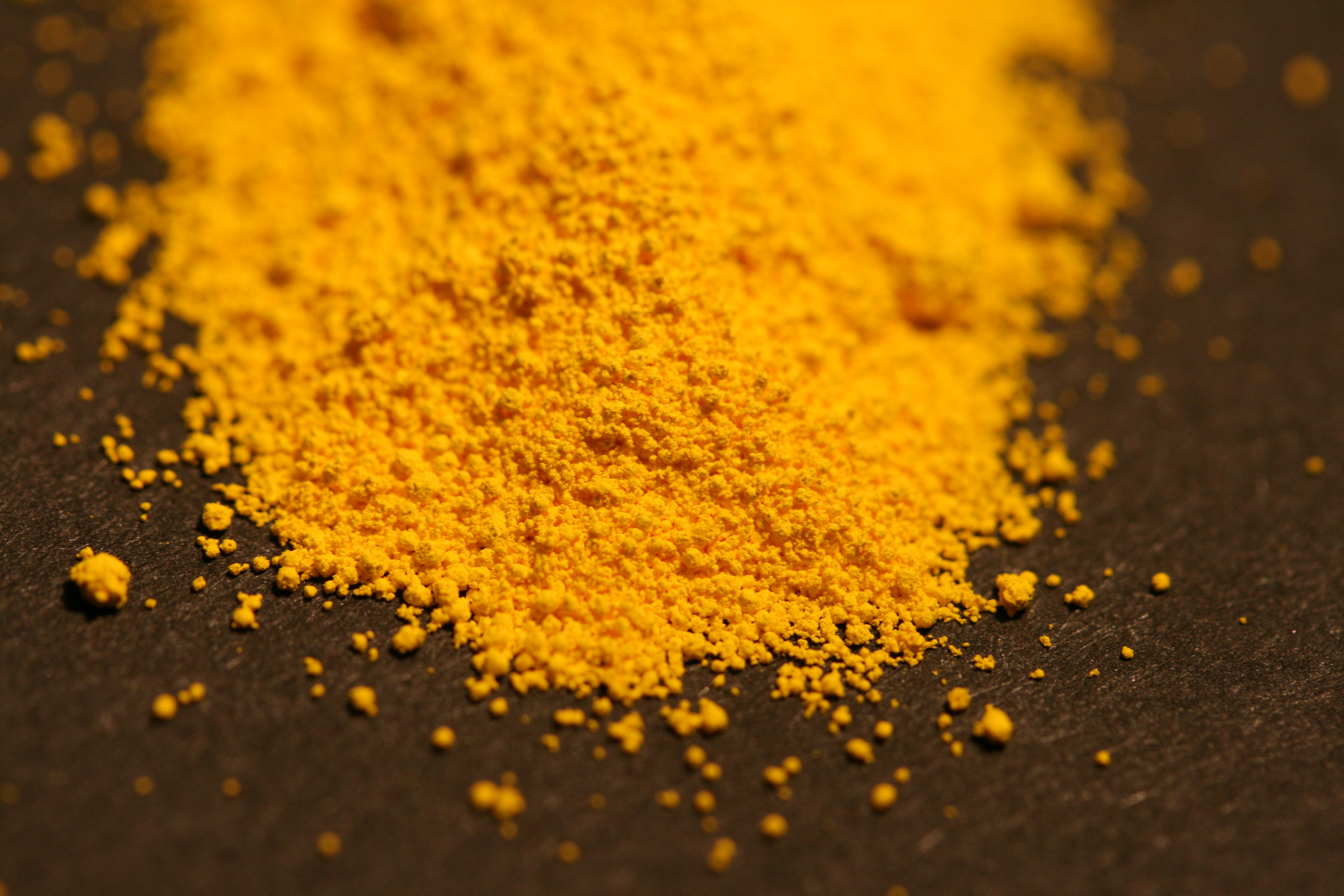
- Yellow cadmium pigment

Color coordinates
- Hex triplet: #FFF600
- sRGB^{B} (r, g, b): (255, 246, 0)
- HSV (h, s, v): (58°, 100%, 100%)
- CIELCh_{uv} (L, C, h): (95, 104, 82°)
- Source: ColorHexa
- ISCC–NBS descriptor: Vivid greenish yellow
- B: Normalized to [0–255] (byte)

Cadmium green
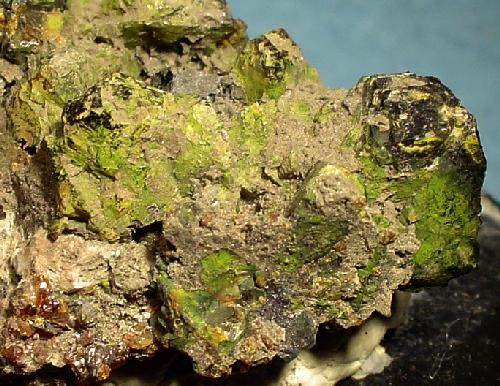
- Greenockite, a cadmium sulfide mineral on sphalerite

Color coordinates
- Hex triplet: #006B3C
- sRGB^{B} (r, g, b): (0, 107, 60)
- HSV (h, s, v): (154°, 100%, 42%)
- CIELCh_{uv} (L, C, h): (39, 44, 142°)
- Source: ColorHexa
- ISCC–NBS descriptor: Deep yellowish green
- B: Normalized to [0–255] (byte)

Cadmium pigments are a class of pigments that contain cadmium. Most of the cadmium produced worldwide has been for use in rechargeable nickel–cadmium batteries, which have been replaced by other rechargeable nickel-chemistry cell varieties such as NiMH cells, but about half of the remaining consumption of cadmium, which is approximately 2,000 tonnes (2,200 short tons) annually, is used to produce colored cadmium pigments. The principal pigments are a family of yellow, orange and red cadmium sulfides and sulfoselenides, as well as compounds with other metals.

Cadmium is toxic in very small amounts to humans and other animals, especially when it is inhaled, which often happens when working with powdered pigment or breathing the dust from chalk pastels. As a result, it is not appropriate for children to use any art supplies that contain cadmium pigments. However, because the pigments have some desirable qualities, such as resistance to fading, some adult artists continue to use them.

== Artists' paints ==
Cadmium's potential in producing pigments was identified almost immediately after its discovery in 1817, although it wasn't until the 1840s that commercial extraction of the metal was widespread enough to make it economically viable for the average artist. Brilliantly colored, with good permanence and tinting power, cadmium yellow, cadmium orange and cadmium red are now familiar artists’ colors, and are frequently employed as architectural paints, as they can add life and vibrancy to renderings. Their greatest modern use is in the coloring of plastics and specialty paints, which must resist processing or service temperatures up to 300 °C (572 °F). The colorfastness or permanence of cadmium requires protection from the element's tendency to slowly form carbonate salts with exposure to air. Most paint vehicles accomplish this, but cadmium colors will fade in fresco or mural painting.

The following are commonly used as pigments in artists' paints:

- Cadmium yellow is cadmium sulfide (CdS), C.I. Pigment Yellow 37.
- Cadmium sulfoselenide is a solid solution of CdS and cadmium selenide; depending on the sulfur-to-selenium ratio, C.I. Pigment Orange 20 or C.I. Pigment Red 108 is obtained.
- Zinc cadmium sulfide is a greenish, solid solution of CdS and zinc sulfide, C.I. Pigment Yellow 35.
- Cadmium yellow is sometimes mixed with viridian to give a vivid green mixture called cadmium green.

When first introduced, there were hardly any stable pigments in the yellow-to-red range, with orange and bright red being very troublesome. The cadmium pigments eventually replaced compounds such as mercury(II) sulfide (the original vermilion) with greatly improved lightfastness.

Cadmium pigments are known for excellent lightfastness, although the lighter shades can fade in sunlight. A cadmium yellow paint was frequently used on Bob Ross' TV show The Joy of Painting.

In July 2023, the brilliance of cadmium yellow (especially "Cadmium Yellow Lemon No.1 by Lucien Lefebvre-Foinet") used by some modern artists, was reported to have faded over time due to chemical degradation.

== Coloring art glass ==
Cadmium compounds are utilized in coloring borosilicate glass used by artists in lampworking. The palette is often referred to as "cadmium colors" or "cadmium-based colors" and is marked by uniquely bright and saturated tones not found in other colored glass. Cadmium pigments used in borosilicate have a relatively short history, with the first commercial formulations hitting the market in 2000 under the name Crayon Colors by Henry Grimmett of Glass Alchemy.

Cadmium-compound-containing glass exhibits a characteristically low heat tolerance when melted, and therefore must be treated with caution when lampworking to avoid boiling off of the cadmium sulfide. CdS has a boiling point of 980 °C (1,796 °F), putting its maximum temperature tolerance as a pigment not far above the working temperature range for borosilicate, which has a softening point of approximately 850 °C (1,562 °F).

== Safety ==
Cadmium sulfide is not very toxic (LD_{50} above 5,000 mg/kg). Cadmium is introduced into the body most commonly through smoking and the diet. Poisoning by pigments is uncommon but of continuing concern. Acute exposure to cadmium vapors can arise from welding near cadmium pigments.

The cadmium pigments have been partially replaced by azo pigments, which have significantly inferior lightfastness.

In December 2013, the Swedish Chemicals Agency (KEMI) proposed a case to the European Chemicals Agency (ECHA) in favor of restricting or banning cadmium use in artists’ paints, as cadmium in pigments used in other types of paints was already restricted and regulated via TARIC codes and REACH Annex XVII. This proposal stated that cadmium in the body leads to increased risk of bone fractures and breast cancer as well as an array of environmental impacts, and that paint washed down the drain is absorbed by crops that are then consumed, increasing the average dietary cadmium intake. This can cause an array of health effects, including kidney and liver damage, skeletal damage, several types of cancers and death. KEMI's proposal was ultimately declined.

In a June 2015 article of Just Paint, published by Golden Artist Colors, the company argued against KEMI's proposal, offering that "There are no alternatives that match all of the characteristics of cadmium pigments." This statement was also included in Golden's response to KEMI's request for information on cadmium-pigmented artists’ paints while the agency was composing its ban proposal. The article also stated that a ban would be technically feasible for some artists, but not all, and that "cadmium colors are not for use by children, should not be spray applied or sanded, and unless one is properly protected from exposure and in a non-household setting, use of dry cadmium pigment should be avoided."

Inhalation poses the greatest risk from cadmium pigments, though the chemical is very low-risk when sealed within a pigment particle because of its insolubility. The use of chalk pastels containing cadmium colors is among the highest risks for artists, as these pastels create a dust that can be inhaled.

== Examples of cadmium pigments ==
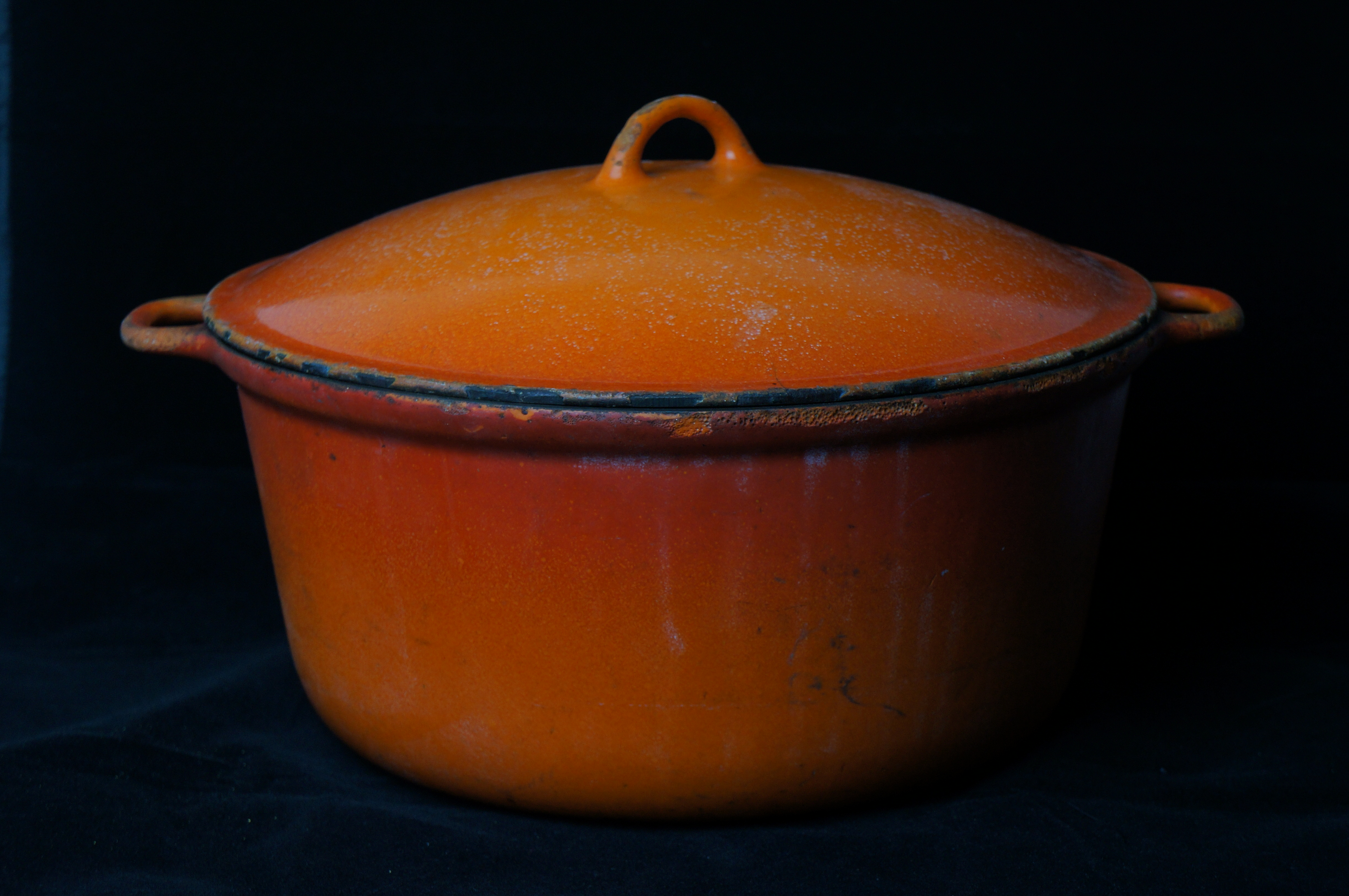
Cadmium orange cast-iron pot

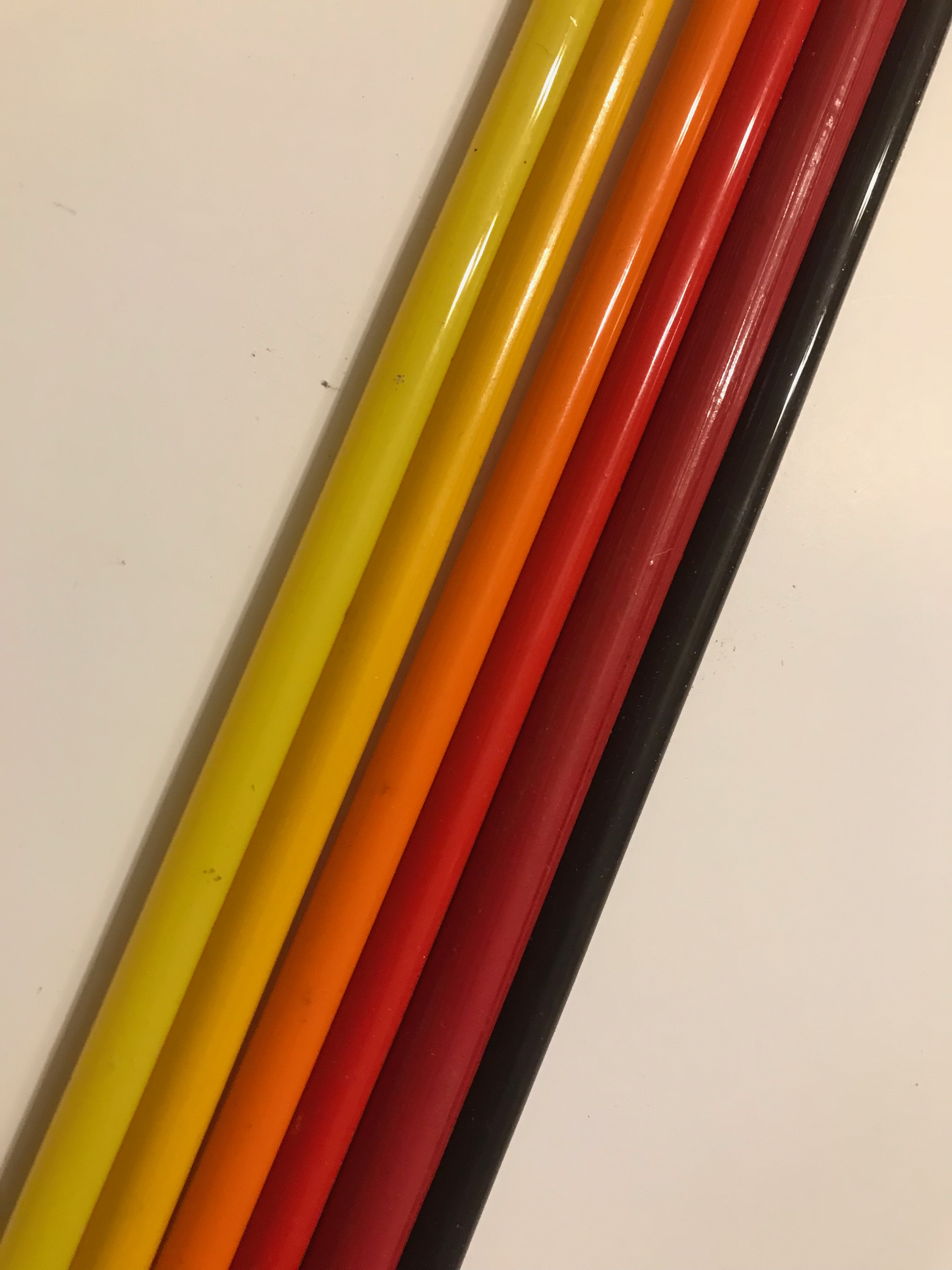
Borosilicate glass colored with cadmium compounds

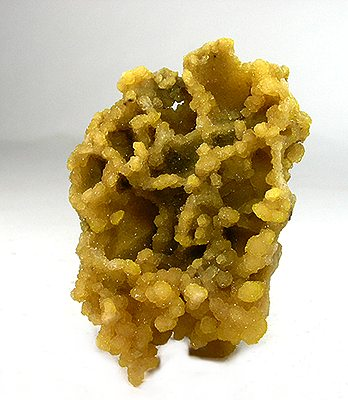
Cadmium-rich hemimorphite crusted on smithsonite

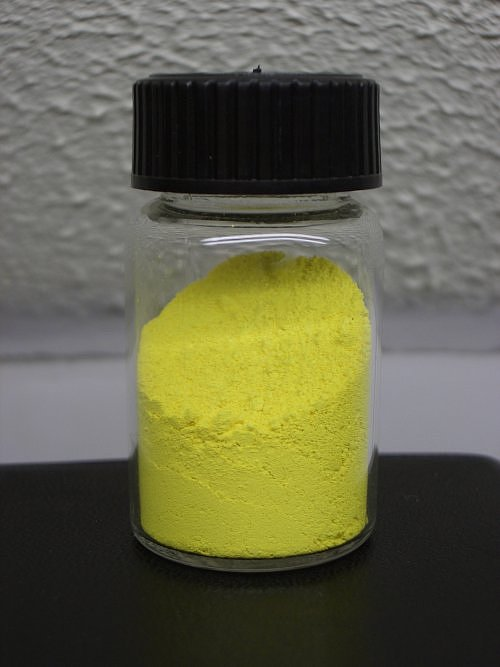
Cadmium sulfide

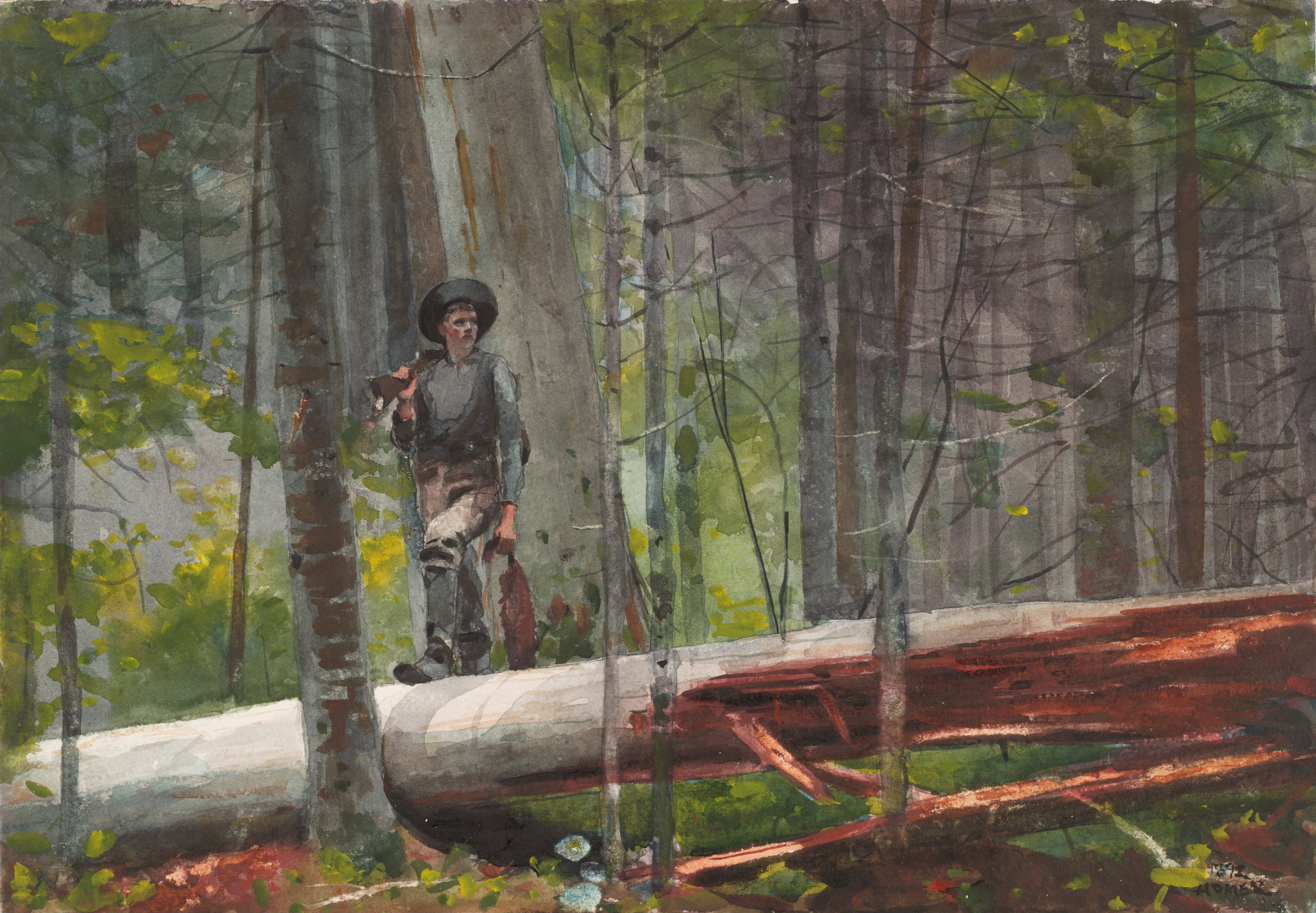
Winslow Homer, "Hunter in the Adirondacks" (1892)

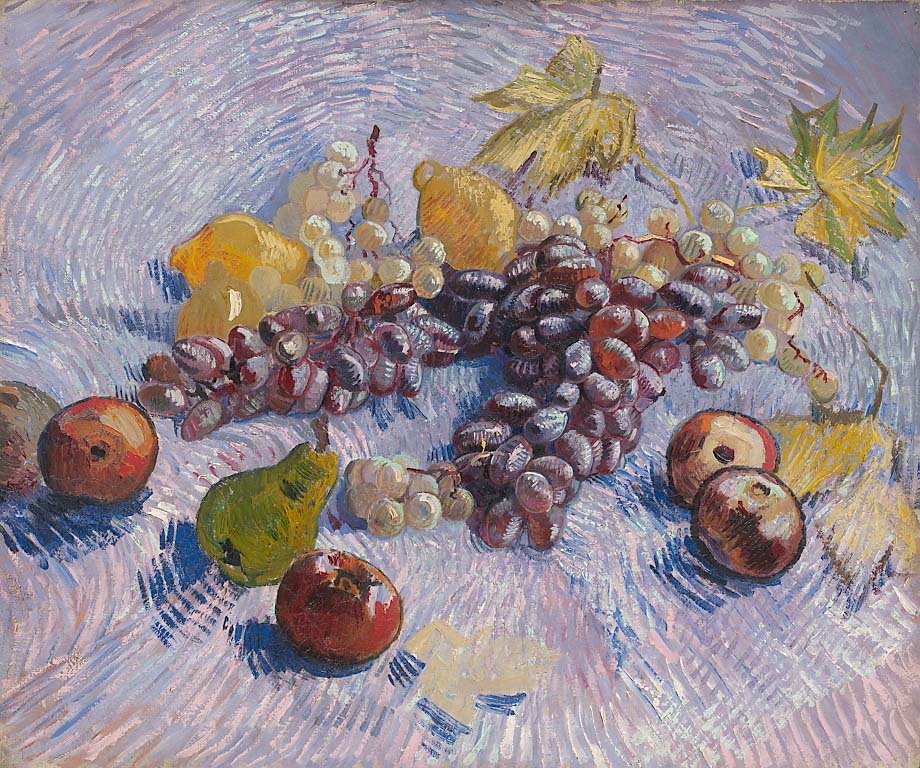
Vincent van Gogh, "Grapes, Lemons, Pears, and Apples" (1887)

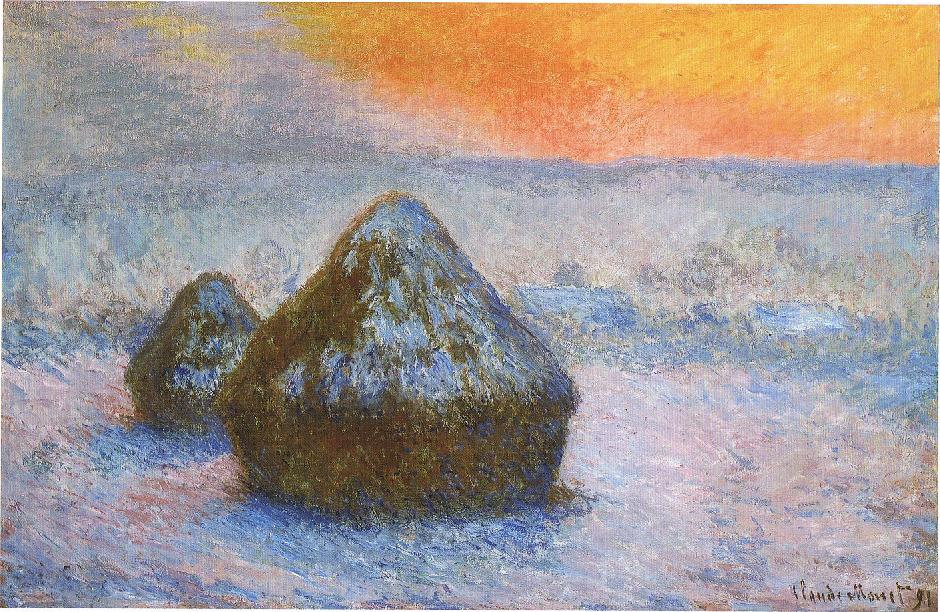
Claude Monet, "Wheatstacks (Sunset, Snow Effect)" (1890–91)

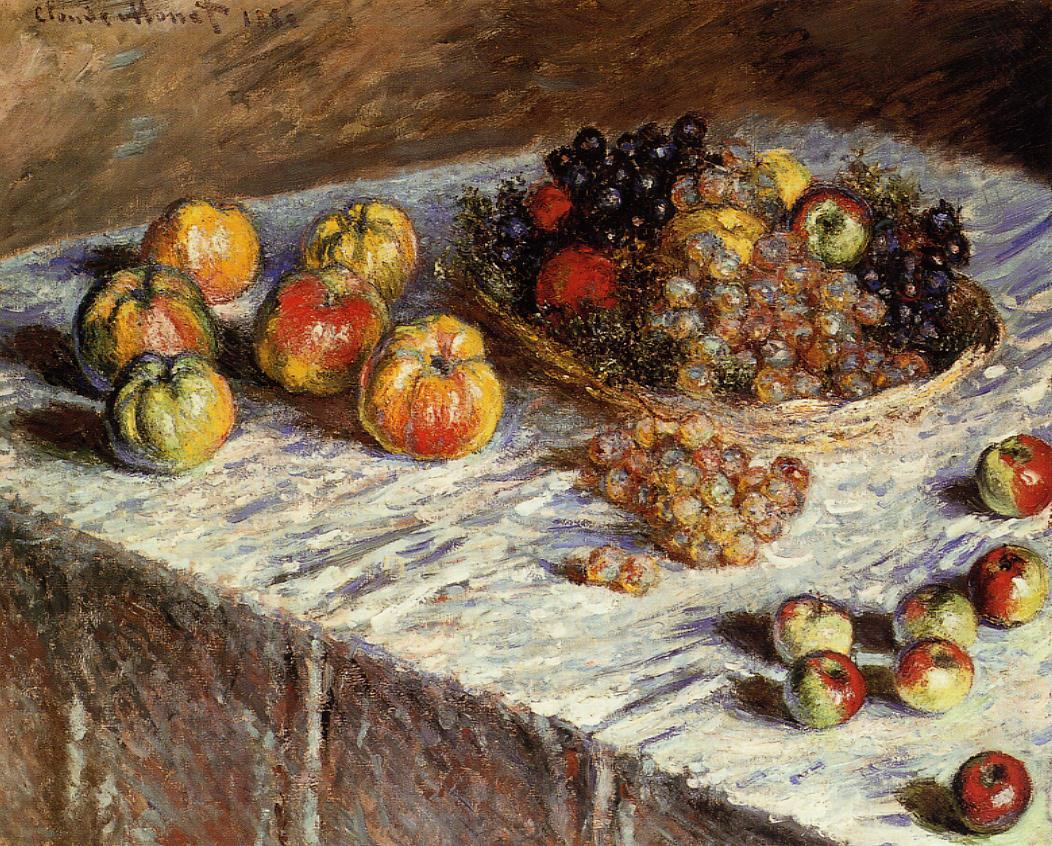
Claude Monet, "Still Life with Apples and Grapes" (1880)

== See also ==
- List of inorganic pigments
- Red pigments
