= Hawleyite =

Sulfide mineral

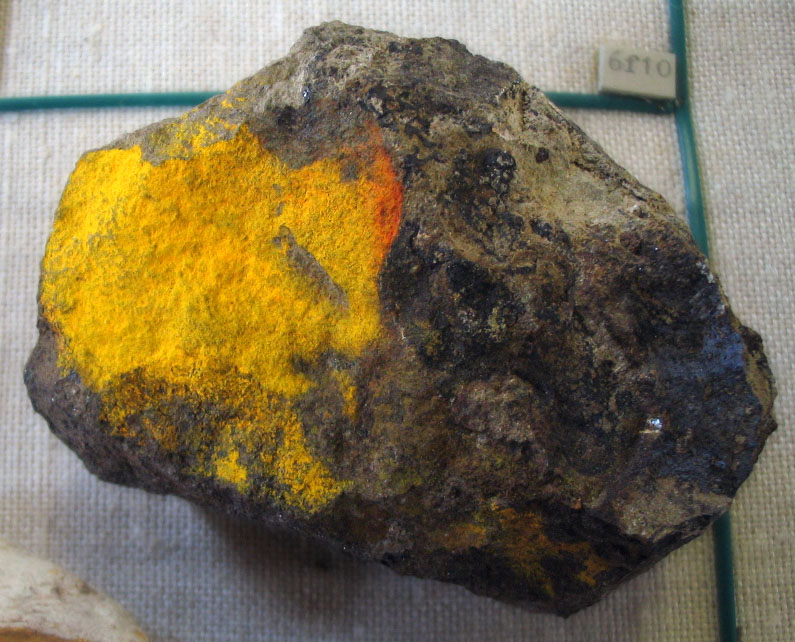
- Orange-yellow earthy coating

General
- Category: Sulfide mineral
- Formula: CdS
- IMA symbol: Hwl
- Strunz classification: 2.CB.05a
- Crystal system: Cubic
- Crystal class: Hextetrahedral (4̅3m); H-M symbol: (4̅ 3m)
- Space group: F4̅3m
- Unit cell: a = 5.818 Å; Z = 4

Structure
- Jmol (3D): Interactive image

Identification
- Color: Bright yellow
- Crystal habit: Powdery massive
- Mohs scale hardness: 2.5–3
- Luster: Metallic
- Streak: Light yellow
- Diaphaneity: Translucent to opaque
- Specific gravity: 4.87

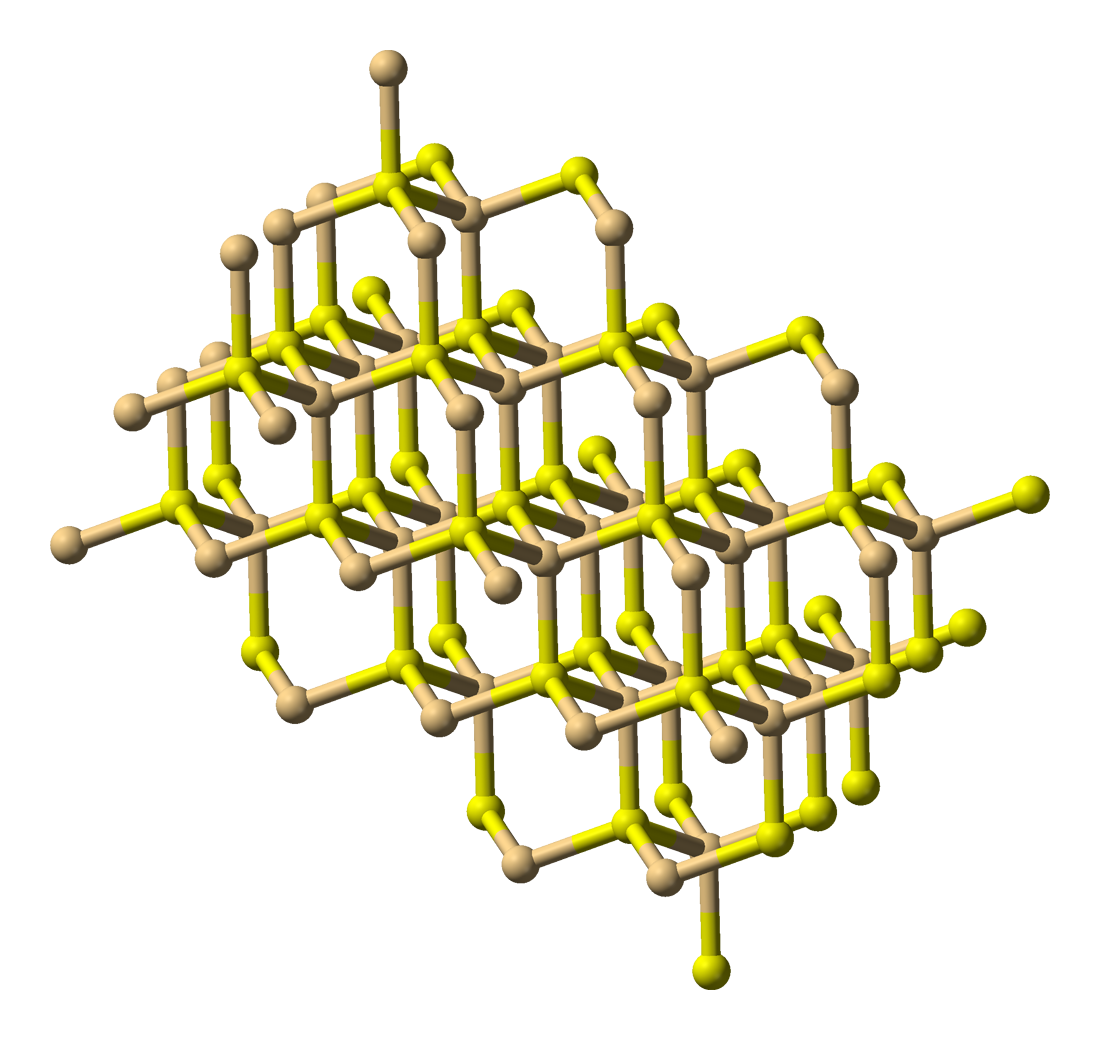
Structure of Hawleyite

Hawleyite is a rare sulfide mineral in the sphalerite group, dimorphous and easily confused with greenockite. Chemically, it is cadmium sulfide, and occurs as a bright yellow coating on sphalerite or siderite in vugs, deposited by meteoric water.

It was discovered in 1955 in the Hector-Calumet mine, Keno-Galena Hill area, Yukon Territory and named in honour of mineralogist James Edwin Hawley (1897–1965), a professor at Queen's University in Ontario, Canada.

== See also ==
- Cadmium
- Sulfide mineral
- List of minerals
- List of minerals named after people
