= Wurtzite =

Zinc and iron mixed sulfide mineral: (Zn,Fe)S

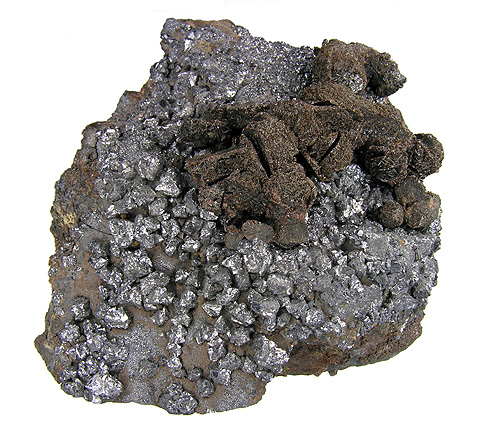

General
- Category: Sulfide mineral
- Formula: (Zn,Fe)S
- IMA symbol: Wur
- Strunz classification: 2.CB.45
- Dana classification: 02.08.07.01
- Crystal system: Hexagonal
- Crystal class: Dihexagonal pyramidal (6mm); H-M symbol: (6mm)
- Space group: P6_{3}mc

Structure
- Jmol (3D): Interactive image

Identification
- Color: Brownish black, orange brown, reddish brown, black
- Crystal habit: Radial clusters and colloform crusts and masses. Also as tabular crystals
- Cleavage: [112̅0] and [0001]
- Fracture: Uneven – irregular
- Mohs scale hardness: 3.5–4
- Luster: Resinous, brilliant submetallic on crystal faces
- Streak: light brown
- Diaphaneity: Translucent
- Specific gravity: 4.09 measured, 4.10 calculated
- Optical properties: Uniaxial (+)
- Refractive index: n_{ω} = 2.356 n_{ε} = 2.378
- Birefringence: δ = 0.022
- Other characteristics: Nonmagnetic, non-radioactive

Wurtzite is a zinc and iron sulfide mineral with the chemical formula (Zn,Fe)S, a less frequently encountered structural polymorph form of sphalerite. The iron content is variable up to eight percent. It is trimorphous with matraite and sphalerite.

It occurs in hydrothermal deposits associated with sphalerite, pyrite, chalcopyrite, barite and marcasite. It also occurs in low-temperature clay–ironstone concretions.

It was first described in 1861 for an occurrence in the San José Mine, Oruro City, Cercado Province, Oruro Department, Bolivia, and named for French chemist Charles-Adolphe Wurtz. It has widespread distribution. In Europe it is reported from Příbram, Czech Republic; Hesse, Germany; and Liskeard, Cornwall, England. In the US it is reported from Litchfield County, Connecticut; Butte, Silver Bow County, Montana; at Frisco, Beaver County, Utah; and from the Joplin district, Jasper County, Missouri.

== Structure ==
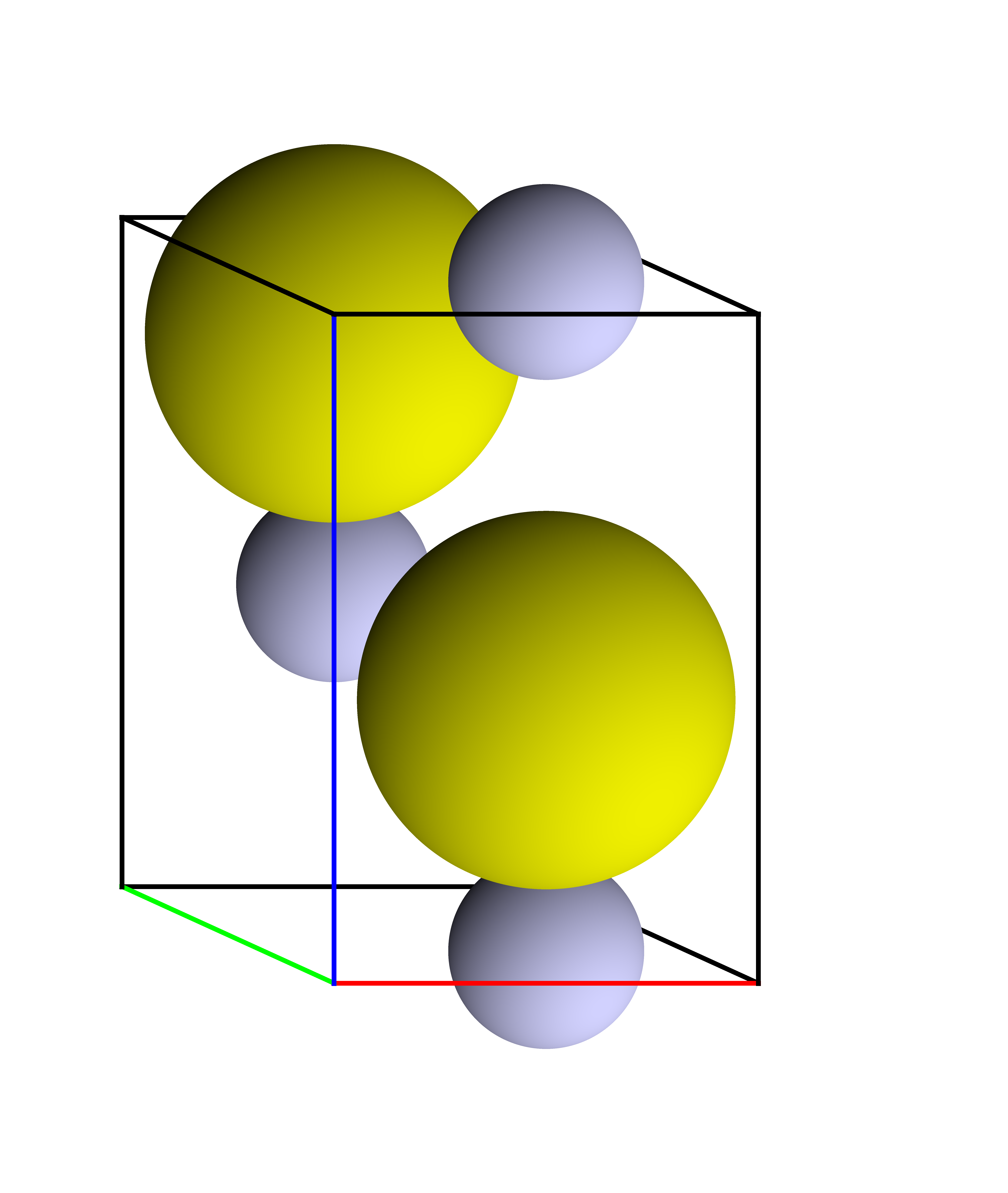
Wurtzite unit cell. The grey balls represent metal atoms, and yellow balls represent sulfur or selenium atoms.

The wurtzite group includes cadmoselite (CdSe), greenockite (CdS), mátraite (ZnS), and rambergite (MnS), in addition to wurtzite.

Its crystal structure is called the wurtzite crystal structure, to which it lends its name. This structure is a member of the hexagonal crystal system and consists of tetrahedrally coordinated zinc and sulfur atoms that are stacked in an ABABABABAB pattern.

The unit cell parameters of wurtzite are (-2H polytype):

- a = b = 3.81 Å = 381 pm
- c = 6.23 Å = 623 pm
- V = 78.41 Å^{3}
- Z = 2

== See also ==
- Wurtzite crystal structure
