= Cadmoselite =

Cadmium selenide mineral

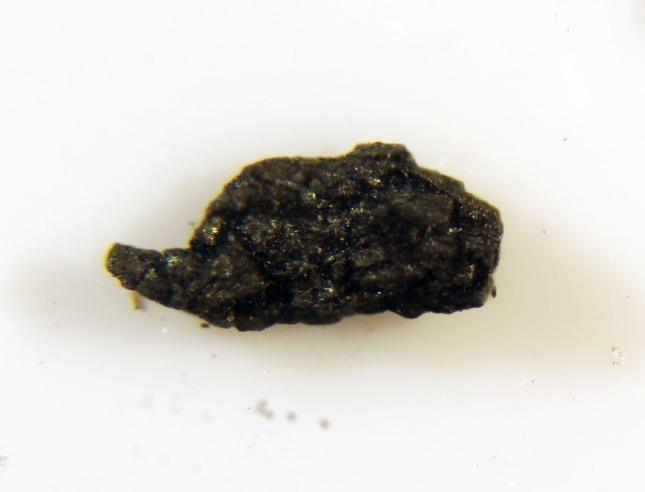
- Cadmoselite from the type locality: Ust' Uyok Deposit, Turan District, Tuva Republic, Russian Federation

General
- Category: Minerals
- Formula: CdSe
- IMA symbol: Cds

Identification
- Formula mass: 191.37
- Color: Black to pale grey
- Luster: Adamantine – Resinous
- Streak: Black
- Diaphaneity: Translucent to Opaque
- Specific gravity: 5.47

Cadmoselite is a rare cadmium selenide mineral with chemical formula CdSe. Cadmoselite crystallizes in the hexagonal system and occurs as black to pale grey opaque crystals and grains.

It was first described in 1957 for an occurrence in Tuva. The mineral occurs as interstitial grains in sandstone formed under reducing alkaline diagenetic conditions.
