= Dimethylcadmium =

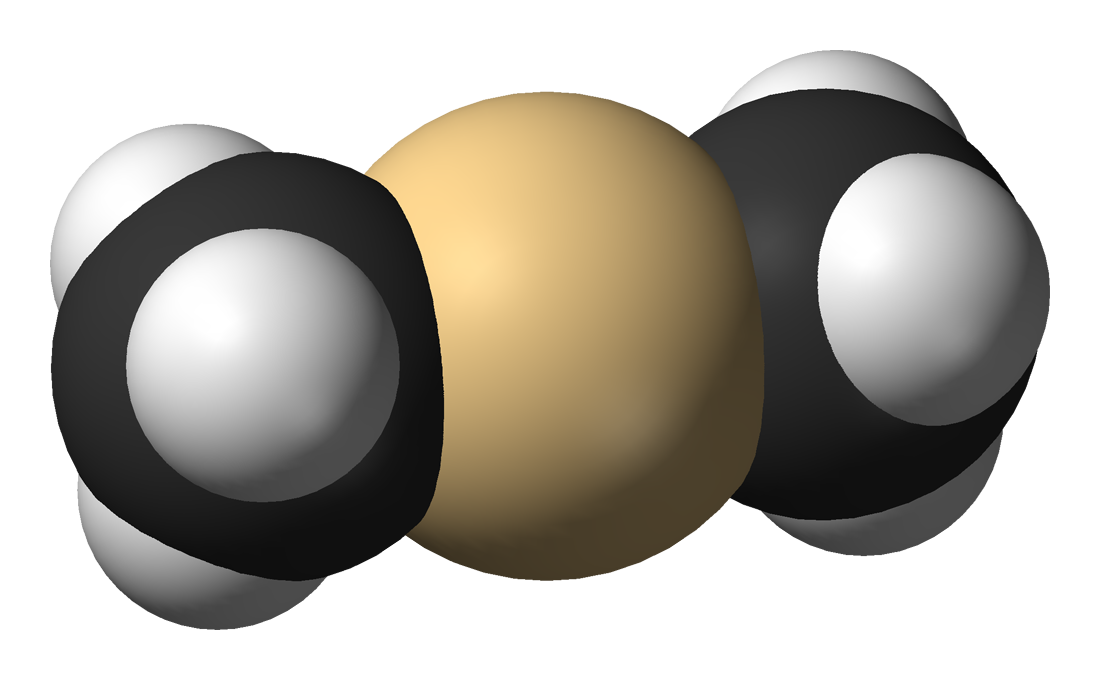

Identifiers
CAS Number	506-82-1
3D model (JSmol)	Interactive image
ChEBI	CHEBI:229455
ChemSpider	10254476
ECHA InfoCard	100.007.324
EC Number	208-055-4
PubChem CID	10479
UNII	0T3G3H597H
CompTox Dashboard (EPA)	DTXSID20964832
- InChI: InChI=1S/2CH3.Cd/h2*1H3; Key: KVVGSXJGEUULNM-UHFFFAOYSA-N
- SMILES: C[Cd]C

Properties
Chemical formula	C_{2}H_{6}Cd
Molar mass	142.484 g·mol^{−1}
Appearance	Colorless liquid
Odor	Foul; unpleasant; metallic; disagreeable; characteristic
Density	1.985 g/mL
Melting point	−4.5 °C (23.9 °F; 268.6 K)
Boiling point	106 °C (223 °F; 379 K)
Solubility in water	Reacts with water

Hazards
- Occupational safety and health (OHS/OSH)
Main hazards	Extremely toxic, reacts with water to release methane
- GHS labelling
Pictograms	(GHS02: Flammable) (GHS06: Toxic) (GHS08: Health hazard)
Signal word	Danger
Hazard statements	H225, H250, H252, H260, H301, H330, H350, H360
Precautionary statements	P101, P102, P103, P222, P231, P301+P310, P303+P361+P353, P305+P351+P338, P403+P233, P422, P501
NFPA 704 (fire diamond)	4 4 2 W
Flash point	18 °C (64 °F; 291 K)

Related compounds
Related compounds	Dimethylzinc; Dimethylmercury
- Except where otherwise noted, data are given for materials in their standard state (at 25 °C [77 °F], 100 kPa). Infobox references

Dimethylcadmium is the organocadmium compound with the formula Cd(CH_{3})_{2}. It is a colorless, highly toxic liquid that fumes in air. It is a linear molecule with C-Cd bond lengths of 213 pm. The compound finds limited use as a reagent in organic synthesis and in metalorganic chemical vapor deposition (MOCVD). It has also been used in the synthesis of cadmium selenide nanoparticles, although efforts have been made to replace it in this capacity due to its toxicity.

Dimethylcadmium is prepared by treating cadmium dihalides with methyl Grignard reagents or methyllithium.

CdBr_{2} + 2 CH_{3}MgBr → Cd(CH_{3})_{2} + 2 MgBr_{2}

The same method was used in the first preparation of this compound.

Dimethylcadmium is a weak Lewis acid, forming a labile adduct with diethyl ether. A yellow, air-sensitive adduct is formed with 2,2'-bipyridine.
