= Greenockite =

Cadmium sulfide mineral

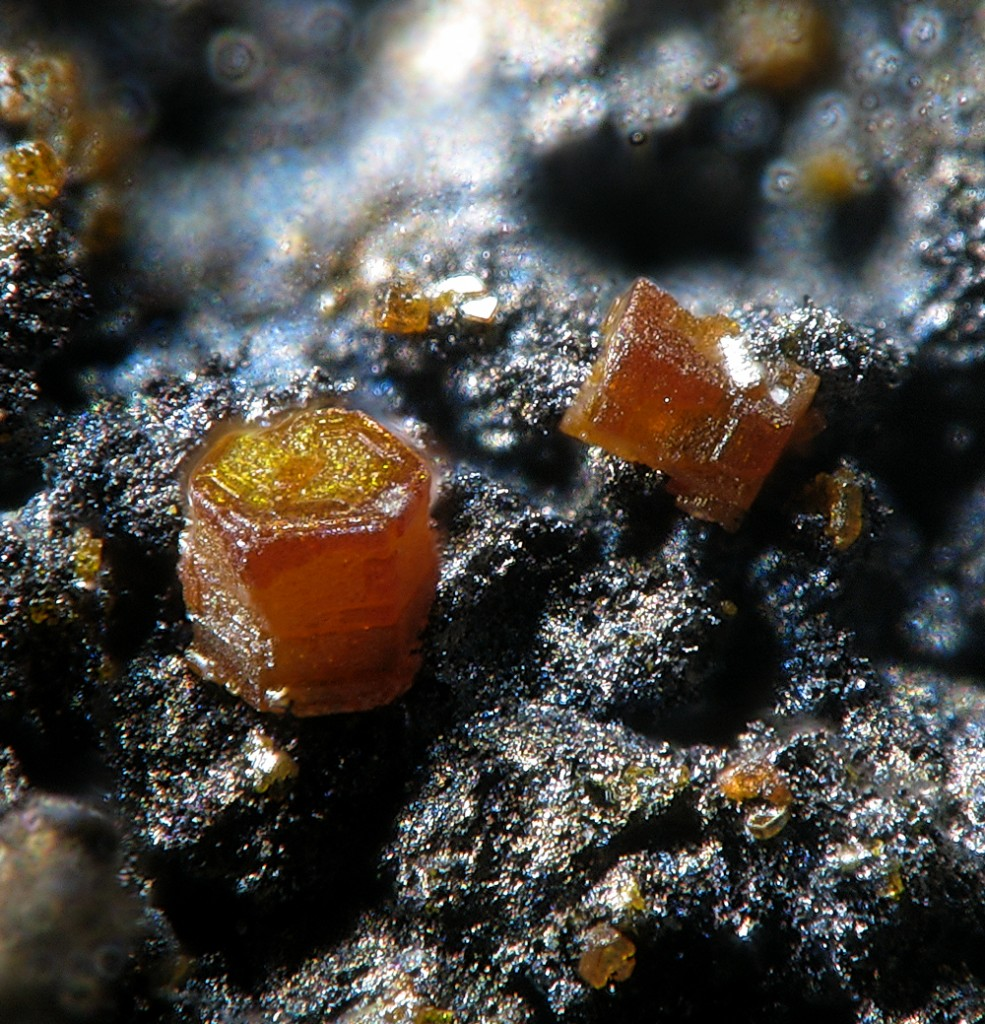
- Greenockite crystals from Tsumeb Mine, Namibia (Picture width 1 mm)

General
- Category: Sulfide mineral
- Formula: CdS
- IMA symbol: Gnk
- Strunz classification: 2.CB.45
- Crystal system: Hexagonal
- Crystal class: Dihexagonal pyramidal (6mm) (same H-M symbol)
- Space group: P6_{3}mc
- Unit cell: a = 4.136 c = 6.713 [Å]; Z = 2

Structure
- Jmol (3D): Interactive image

Identification
- Formula mass: 144.48
- Color: Honey yellow, citron yellow, orange yellow
- Crystal habit: Colloform – forming from a gel or colloidal mass; encrustations – forms crust-like aggregates on matrix; radial – crystals radiate from a center without producing stellar forms (e.g. stibnite)
- Twinning: Rare on {112̅2} forming trillings
- Cleavage: Distinct on {112̅2}, imperfect on {0001}
- Fracture: Conchoidal
- Tenacity: Brittle
- Mohs scale hardness: 3.0–3.5
- Luster: Adamantine to resinous
- Streak: Yellow orange to brick red
- Diaphaneity: Nearly opaque to translucent
- Specific gravity: 4.8–4.9
- Optical properties: Uniaxial (−)
- Refractive index: n_{ω} = 2.529 n_{ε} = 2.506
- Birefringence: δ = 0.023
- Pleochroism: Weak
- Ultraviolet fluorescence: yellow-orange fluorescence under UV when rich in zinc
- Other characteristics: Toxic

Greenockite, also cadmium blende or cadmium ochre (obsolete) is a rare cadmium bearing metal sulfide mineral consisting of cadmium sulfide (CdS) in crystalline form. Greenockite crystallizes in the hexagonal system. It occurs as massive encrustations and as hemimorphic six-sided pyramidal crystals which vary in color from a honey yellow through shades of red to brown. The Mohs hardness is 3 to 3.5 and the specific gravity is 4.8 to 4.9.

Greenockite belongs to the wurtzite group and is isostructural with it at high temperatures. It is also isostructural with sphalerite at low temperatures. It occurs with other sulfide minerals such as sphalerite and galena, and is the only ore mineral of cadmium. Most cadmium is recovered as a byproduct of copper, zinc, and lead mining. It is also known from the lead-zinc districts of the central United States.

It was first recognized in 1840 in Bishopton, Scotland, during the cutting of a tunnel for the Glasgow, Paisley and Greenock Railway. The mineral was named after the land owner Lord Greenock (1783–1859).

== Use ==
Greenockite, also known as "cadmium ochre", was used as a yellow pigment prior to cadmium being recognized as a toxic element. The extracted cadmium has various industrial use, such as electrical nickel-cadmium (NiCd) rechargeable batteries, electroplating, high temp alloys, plating steel and other metals that corrode easily, and use in control rods for some nuclear reactors.
