= Trioctylphosphine oxide =

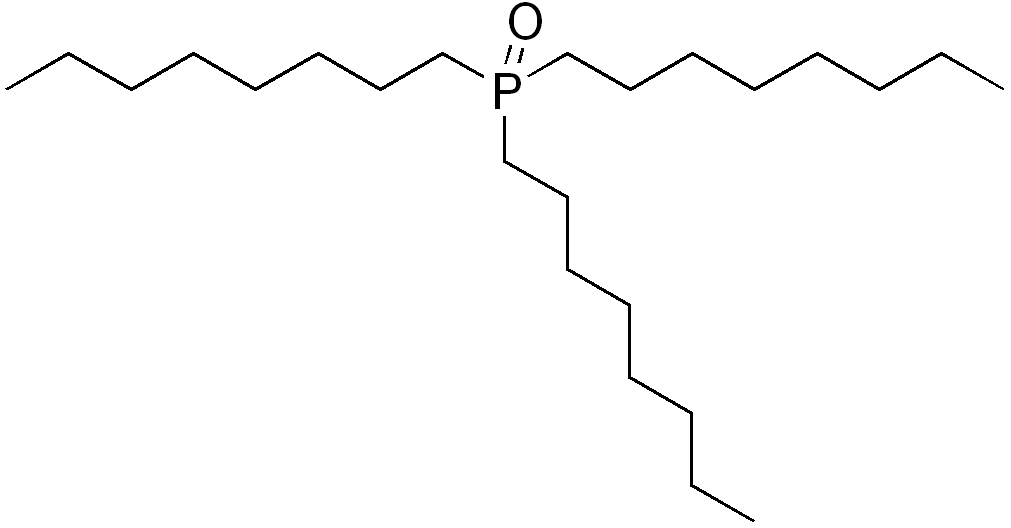
- Structural formula of trioctylphosphine oxide

Names
- Preferred IUPAC name Trioctyl-λ^{5}-phosphanone
- Other names Tri-n-octylphosphine oxide

Identifiers
CAS Number	78-50-2
3D model (JSmol)	Interactive image
Abbreviations	TOPO
Beilstein Reference	1796648
ChemSpider	59020
ECHA InfoCard	100.001.020
EC Number	201-121-3
MeSH	Trioctyl+phosphine+oxide
PubChem CID	65577
RTECS number	SZ1662500
UNII	EXU8U2AM5A
UN number	3077
CompTox Dashboard (EPA)	DTXSID1052537
- InChI: InChI=1S/C24H51OP/c1-4-7-10-13-16-19-22-26(25,23-20-17-14-11-8-5-2)24-21-18-15-12-9-6-3/h4-24H2,1-3H3 Key: ZMBHCYHQLYEYDV-UHFFFAOYSA-N; InChI=1/C24H51OP/c1-4-7-10-13-16-19-22-26(25,23-20-17-14-11-8-5-2)24-21-18-15-12-9-6-3/h4-24H2,1-3H3 Key: ZMBHCYHQLYEYDV-UHFFFAOYAY
- SMILES: CCCCCCCCP(=O)(CCCCCCCC)CCCCCCCC

Properties
Chemical formula	C_{24}H_{51}OP
Molar mass	386.645 g·mol^{−1}
Appearance	White, opaque crystals
Melting point	50 to 54 °C (122 to 129 °F; 323 to 327 K)
Boiling point	411.2 °C (772.2 °F; 684.3 K) at 760 mmHg

Hazards
- GHS labelling
Pictograms	(GHS05: Corrosive)
Signal word	Danger
Hazard statements	H315, H318
Precautionary statements	P264, P280, P302+P352, P305+P351+P338, P310, P332+P313, P362
NFPA 704 (fire diamond)	3 1 0
Flash point	110 °C (230 °F; 383 K)
- Except where otherwise noted, data are given for materials in their standard state (at 25 °C [77 °F], 100 kPa). verify (what is ?) Infobox references

Trioctylphosphine oxide (TOPO) is an organophosphorus compound with the formula OP(C_{8}H_{17})_{3}. Frequently referred to as TOPO, this compound is used as an extraction or stabilizing agent. It is an air-stable white solid at room temperature. It is lipophilic, and like other phosphine oxides serves as a Lewis base owing to a partial negative charge at the O atom.

== Preparation and use ==
TOPO is usually prepared by oxidation of trioctylphosphine, which in turn is produced by alkylation of phosphorus trichloride.

The main use of TOPO is in solvent extraction of metals, especially uranium. The high lipophilicity and high polarity are properties key to this application. Its high polarity, which results from the dipolar phosphorus-oxygen bond, allows this compound to bind to metal ions. The octyl groups confer solubility in low polarity solvents such as kerosene.

In the research laboratory, both trioctylphosphine and TOPO are frequently useful as a capping ligand for the production of quantum dots such as those consisting of CdSe. In these cases, TOPO serves as solvent for the synthesis and solubilizes the growing nanoparticles. TOPO-coated quantum dots are typically soluble in chloroform, toluene, and (to a lesser extent) hexane.
