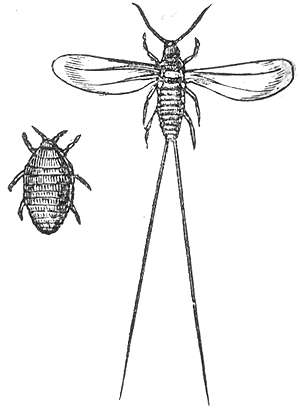
- Female (left) and male (right) cochineals

Scientific classification
- Kingdom: Animalia
- Phylum: Arthropoda
- Clade: Pancrustacea
- Class: Insecta
- Order: Hemiptera
- Suborder: Sternorrhyncha
- Family: Dactylopiidae
- Genus: Dactylopius
- Species: D. coccus

Binomial name
- Dactylopius coccus Costa, 1835

Synonyms
- Coccus cacti Linnaeus, 1758; Pseudococcus cacti Burmeister, 1839

= Cochineal =

Species of insect producing the crimson dye carmine

The cochineal (/ˌkɒtʃɪˈniːl, ˈkɒtʃɪniːl/ KOTCH-in-EEL, -eel, US also /ˌkoʊtʃɪˈniːl, ˈkoʊtʃɪniːl/ KOH-chin-EEL, -eel; Dactylopius coccus) is a scale insect in the suborder Sternorrhyncha, from which the natural dye carmine is derived. A primarily sessile parasite native to tropical and subtropical South America through North America (Mexico and the Southwest United States), this insect lives on cacti in the genus Opuntia, feeding on plant moisture and nutrients. The insects are found on the pads of prickly pear cacti, collected by brushing them off the plants, and dried.

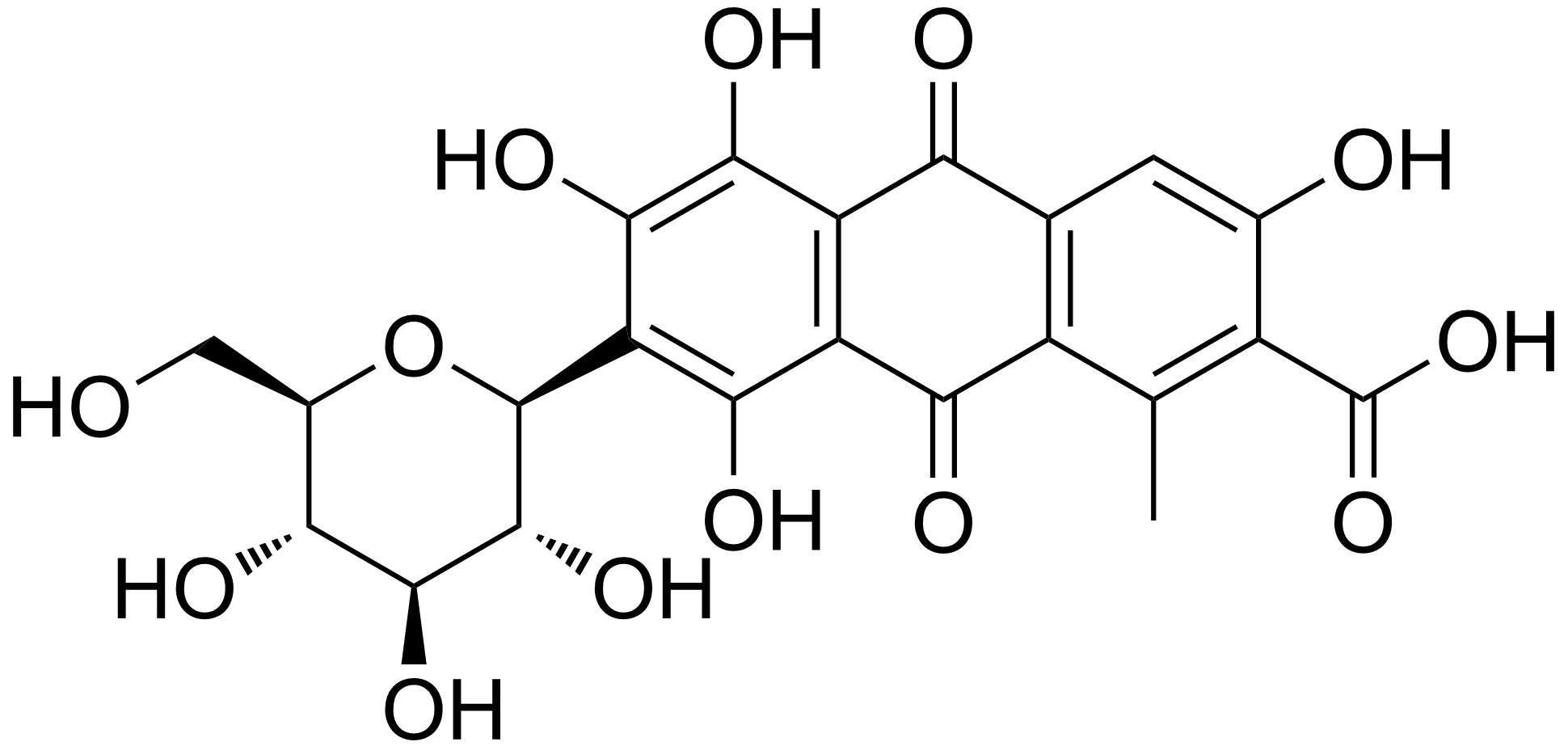
Chemical structure of carminic acid, the predator-deterring substance found in high concentration in cochineal insects: The insoluble aluminium and calcium salts of this acid form red and purple dyes called "carmine".

The insect produces carminic acid that deters predation by other insects. Carminic acid, typically 17–24% of dried insects' weight, can be extracted from the body and eggs, then mixed with aluminium or calcium salts to make carmine dye, also known as cochineal. Today, carmine is primarily used as a colorant in food and in lipstick (E120 or Natural Red 4).

Carmine dye was used in the Americas for coloring fabrics and became an important export good in the 16th century during the colonial period. Production of cochineal is depicted in the Codex Osuna (1565). After synthetic pigments and dyes such as alizarin were invented in the late 19th century, use of natural-dye products gradually diminished. Fears over the safety of artificial food additives renewed the popularity of cochineal dyes, and the increased demand has made cultivation of the insect profitable again, with Peru being the largest producer, followed by Mexico, Chile, Argentina and the Canary Islands.

Other species in the genus Dactylopius can be used to produce "cochineal extract", and are extremely difficult to distinguish from D. coccus, even for expert taxonomists; the scientific term D. coccus and the vernacular "cochineal insect" are sometimes used, intentionally or casually, and possibly with misleading effect, to refer to other species. (Note: The primary biological distinctions between species are minor differences in host plant preferences, along with very different geographic distributions.)

== Etymology ==
The word cochineal is derived from the French cochenille, derived from Spanish cochinilla, in turn derived from Latin coccinus, from Greek κόκκινος kokkinos, "scarlet" from κόκκος kokkos (Latin equivalent coccum) referring in this case either to the oak berry (actually galls formed by the scale insects of the unrelated genus Kermes) or to a red dye made from the crushed bodies thereof. The related in sense word kermes also refers to the source of the red Mediterranean dye also called crimson, which was used in Europe to color cloth red before cochineal was imported from the New World to Spain in the 1520s. Some sources identify the Spanish source word cochinilla as the word for "wood louse", which is a diminutive form of cochino "pig".

== Dactylopius coccus ==
=== Life cycle ===
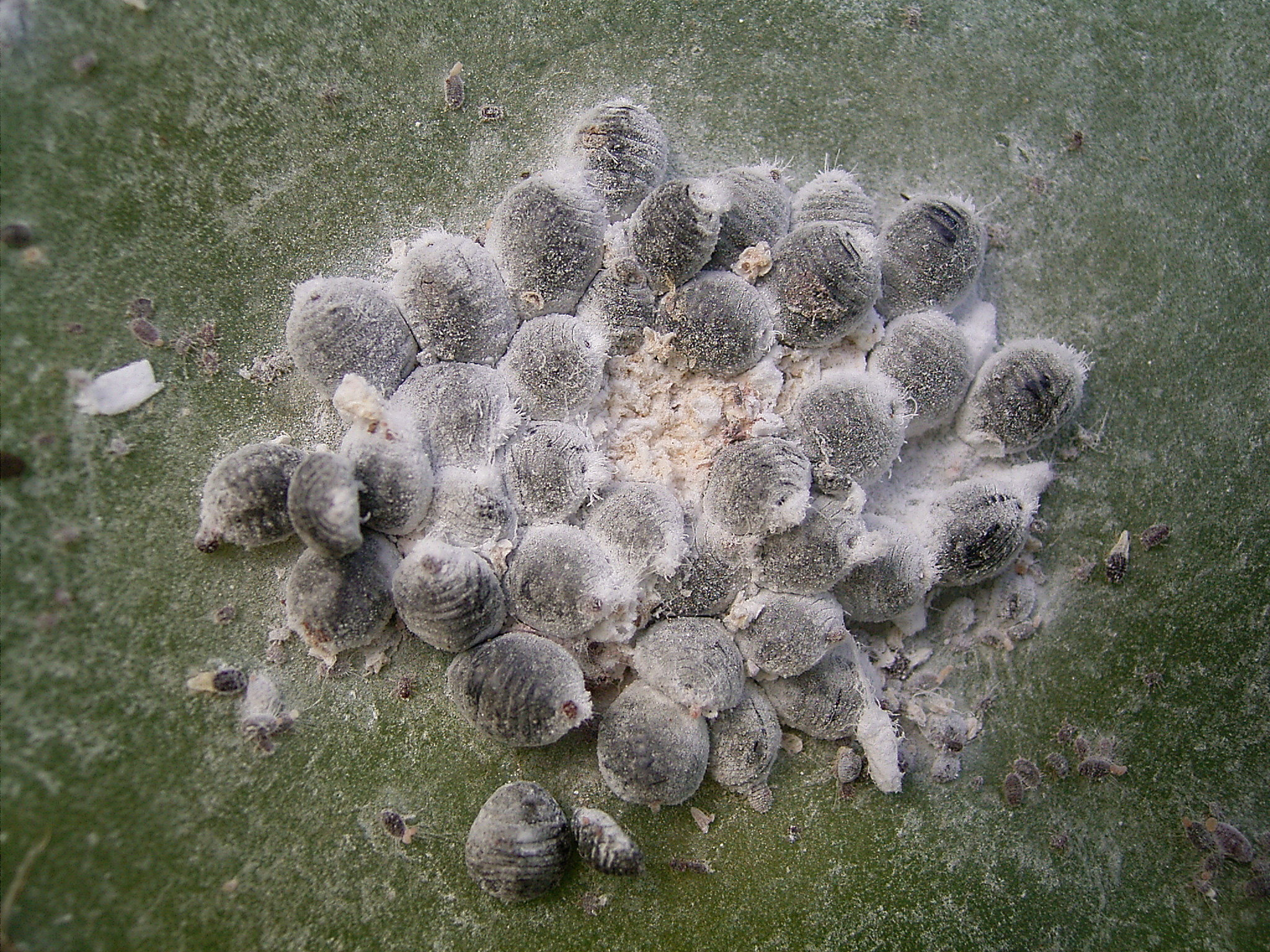
A cluster of females

Cochineal insects are soft-bodied, flat, oval-shaped scale insects. The females, wingless and about 5 mm (0.20 in) long, cluster on cactus pads. They penetrate the cactus with their beak-like mouthparts and feed on its juices, remaining immobile unless alarmed. After mating, the fertilised female increases in size and gives birth to tiny nymphs. The nymphs secrete a waxy white substance over their bodies for protection from water loss and excessive sun. This substance makes the cochineal insect appear white or grey from the outside, though the body of the insect and its nymphs produces the red pigment, which makes the insides of the insect look dark purple. Adult males can be distinguished from females in that males have wings, and are much smaller.

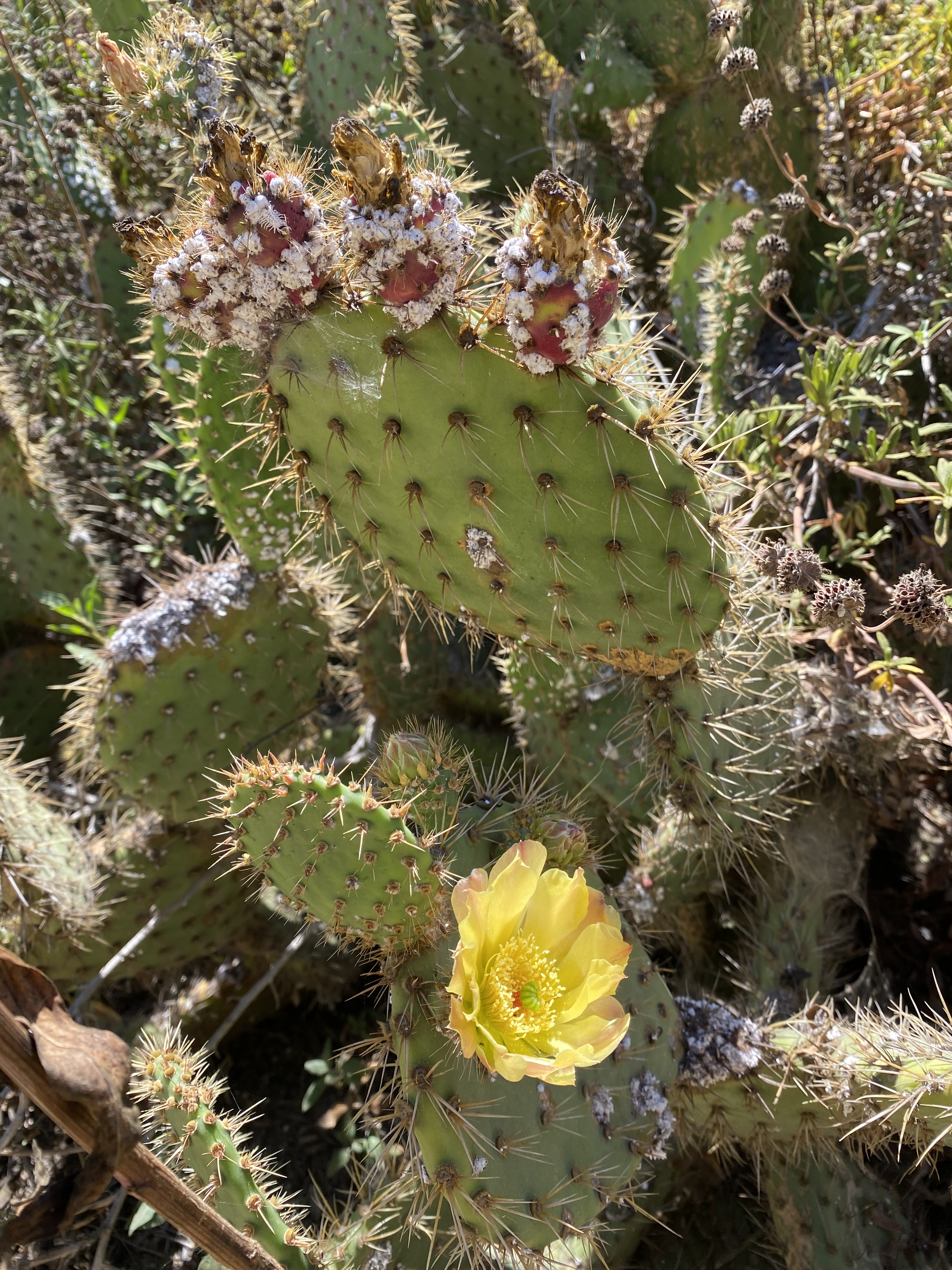
Cochineal on opuntia in California

The cochineal disperses in the first nymph stage, called the "crawler" stage. The juveniles move to a feeding spot and produce long wax filaments. Later, they move to the edge of the cactus pad, where the wind catches the wax filaments and carries the insects to a new host. These individuals establish feeding sites on the new host and produce a new generation of cochineals. Male nymphs feed on the cactus until they reach sexual maturity. At this time, they can no longer feed at all and live only long enough to fertilise the eggs. They are, therefore, seldom observed. In addition, females typically outnumber males due to environmental factors.

=== Host cacti ===
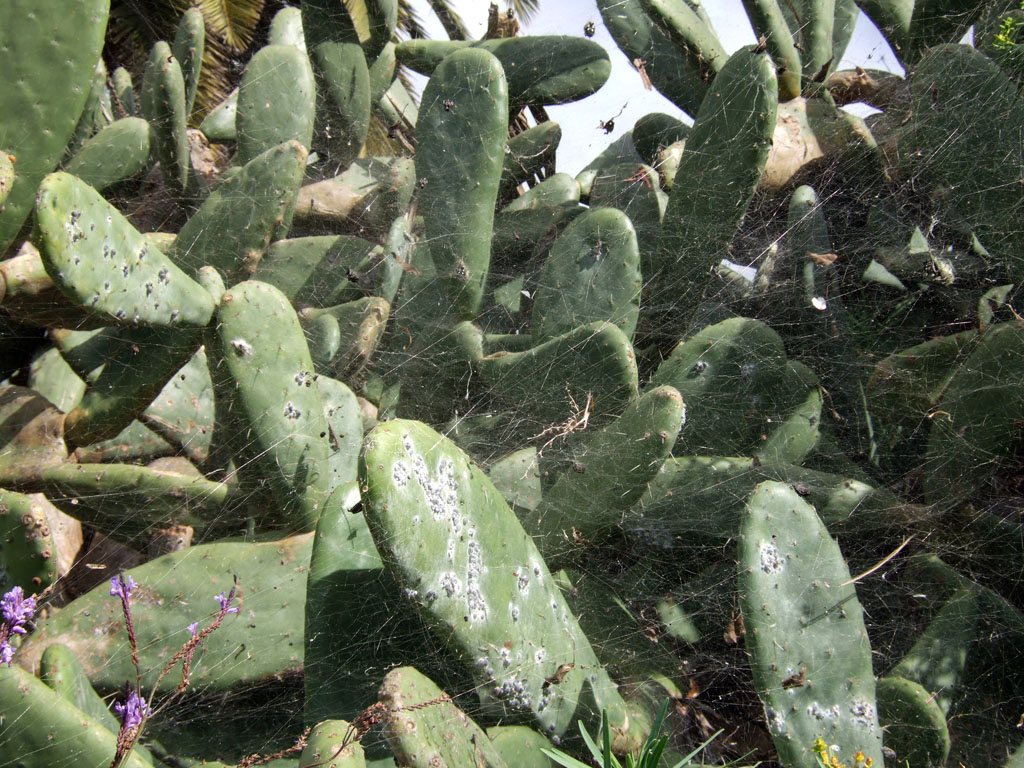
Cochineals on cacti in La Palma, Canary Islands

Dactylopius coccus is native to tropical and subtropical South America and North America in Mexico, where their host cacti grow natively. They have been widely introduced to many regions where their host cacti also grow. About 200 species of Opuntia cacti are known, and while cultivating cochineal on almost all of them is possible, the most common is Opuntia ficus-indica. D. coccus has only been noted on Opuntia species, including O. amyclaea, O. atropes, O. cantabrigiensis, O. brasilienis, O. ficus-indica, O. fuliginosa, O. jaliscana, O. leucotricha, O. lindheimeri, O. microdasys, O. megacantha, O. pilifera, O. robusta, O. sarca, O. schikendantzii, O. stricta, O. streptacantha, and O. tomentosa. Feeding cochineals can damage and kill the plant. Other cochineal species feed on many of the same Opuntia, and the wide range of hosts reported for D. coccus likely is because of the difficulty in distinguishing it from other Dactylopius species.

=== Predation ===
Several natural enemies can reduce the population of the insects on hosts. Of all the predators, insects seem to be the most important group. Insects and their larvae such as pyralid moths (order Lepidoptera), which destroy the cactus, and predators such as lady bugs (Coleoptera), various Diptera (such as Syrphidae and Chamaemyiidae), lacewings (Neuroptera), and ants (Hymenoptera) have been identified, as well as numerous parasitic wasps. Many birds, human-commensal rodents (especially rats), and reptiles, also prey on cochineal insects.

=== Farming ===
A nopal cactus farm for the production of cochineal is traditionally known as a nopalry. The two methods of farming cochineal are traditional and controlled. Cochineals are farmed in the traditional method by planting infected cactus pads or infesting existing cacti with cochineals and harvesting the insects by hand. The controlled method uses small baskets called Zapotec nests placed on host cacti. The baskets contain clean, fertile females that leave the nests and settle on the cactus to await fertilization by the males. In both cases, the cochineals must be protected from predation, cold, and rain. The complete cycle lasts three months, during which time the cacti are kept at a constant temperature of 27 °C (81 °F). At the end of the cycle, the new cochineals are left to reproduce or are collected and dried for dye production.

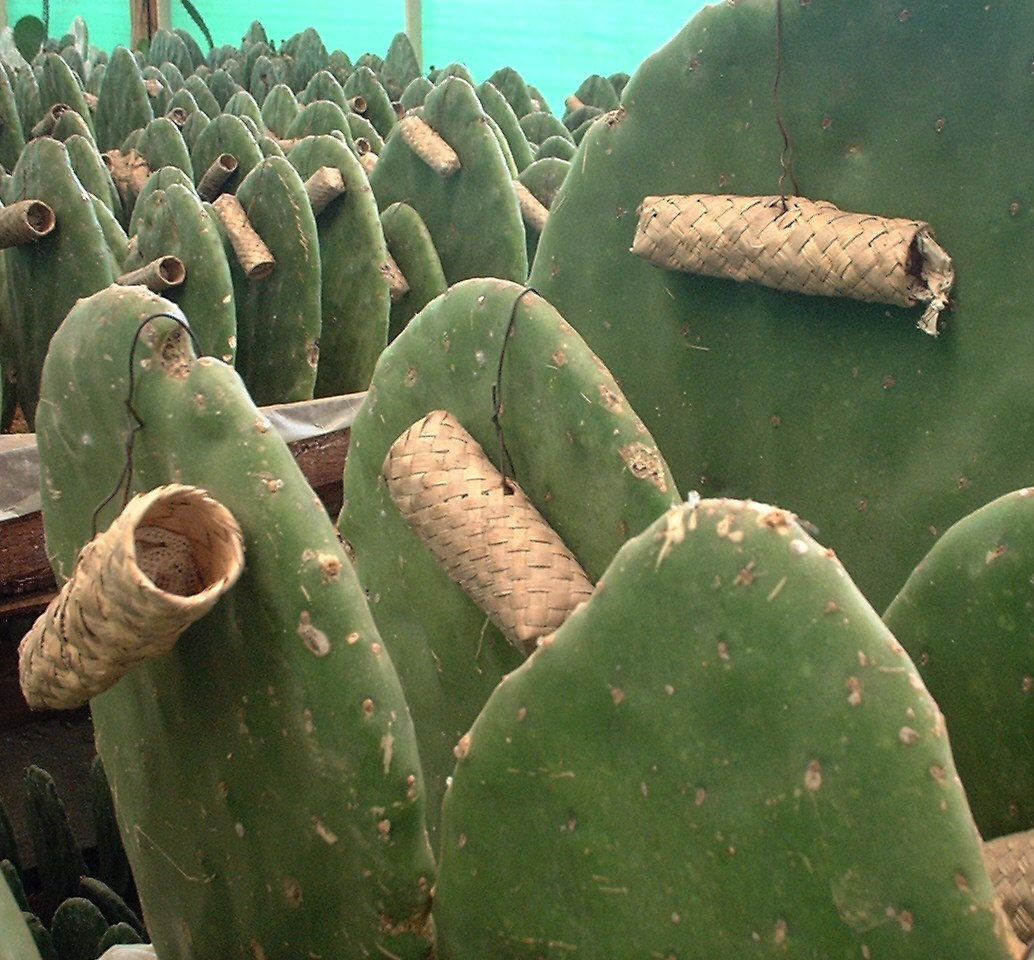
Zapotec nests on O. ficus-indica

To produce dye from cochineals, the insects are collected when they are around 90 days old. Harvesting the insects is labour-intensive, as they must be individually knocked, brushed, or picked from the cacti and placed into bags. The insects are gathered by small groups of collectors who sell them to local processors or exporters.

In regions dependent on cochineal production, pest control measures are taken seriously. For small-scale cultivation, manual methods of control have proved to be the safest and most effective. For large-scale cultivation, advanced pest control methods have to be developed, including alternative bioinsecticides or traps with pheromones.

==== Failed farming in Australia ====
Opuntia species, known commonly as prickly pears, were first brought to Australia in an attempt to start a cochineal dye industry in 1788. Captain Arthur Phillip collected a number of cochineal-infested plants from Brazil on his way to establish the first European settlement at Botany Bay, part of which is now Sydney, New South Wales. At that time, Spain and Portugal had a worldwide cochineal dye monopoly via their New World colonial sources, and the British desired a source under their own control, as the dye was important to their clothing and garment industries; it was used to color the British soldiers' red coats, for example. The attempt was a failure in two ways: the Brazilian cochineal insects soon died off, but the cacti thrived, eventually overrunning about 100,000 sq mi (259,000 km^{2}) of eastern Australia. The cacti were eventually brought under control in the 1920s by the deliberate introduction of a South American moth, Cactoblastis cactorum, the larvae of which feed on the cactus.

==== Failed farming in Ethiopia ====
The nopal pear has been traditionally eaten in parts of northern Ethiopia, where it is utilized more than cultivated. Carmine cochineal was introduced into northern Ethiopia early in the 2000s to be cultivated among farming communities. Foodsafe exported 2000 tons of dried carmine cochineal over 3 years.

A conflict of interest among communities led to closure of the cochineal business in Ethiopia, but the insect spread and became a pest. Cochineal infestation continued to expand after the cochineal business had ended. Control measures were unsuccessful and by 2014 about 16,000 hectares (62 mi^{2}) of cactus land had become infested with cochineal.

==== Biocontrol in South Africa ====
There has been a population of Dactylopius insects on prickly pear cactuses around Cuyler Manor in Uitenhage; several cochineal species were introduced to South Africa, with use encouraged as a biocontrol for different invasive cactus plant species.

== Carmine ==
=== Preparation ===
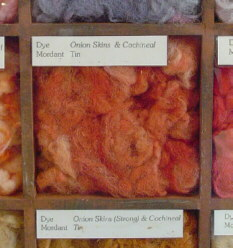
Wool dyed with a mix of cochineal and onion skins

External videos
- "Cochinea Red Dye - The Use of Cochineal Beetles as Natural Fabric Dye in Chinchero, Peru", Quechua woman artisan

Cochineal dyes are one of three groups of red insect dyes, all of which are anthraquinone derivatives. The major color components in their respective chemical structures are carminic acid (in cochineal dyes), kermesic acid (in kermes dye) and laccaic acids (in lac dye).

Carminic acid is extracted from the female cochineal insects and is treated to produce carmine, which can yield shades of red such as crimson and scarlet. The dried body of the female insect is 14–26% carminic acid.

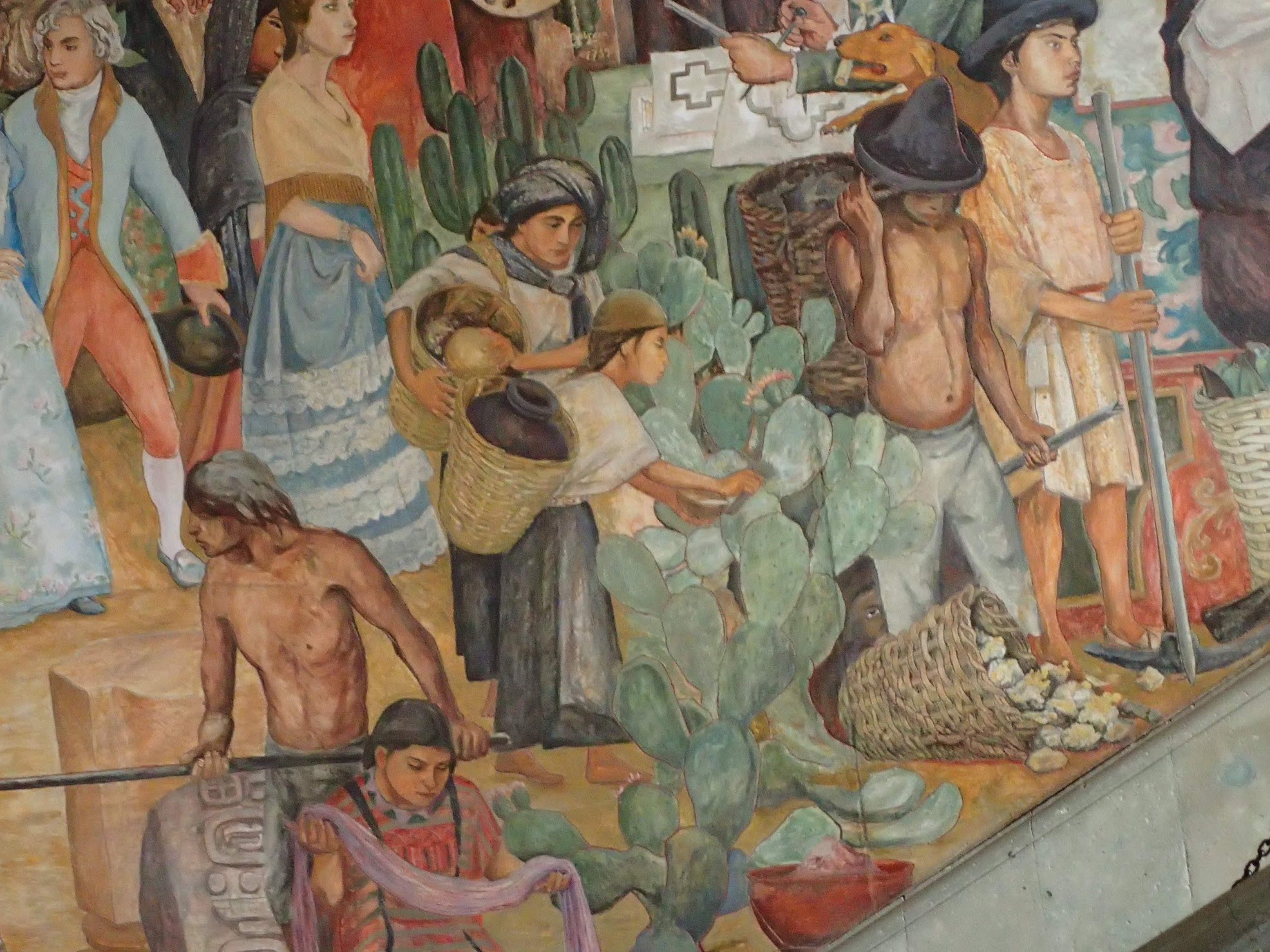
Steps in the cochineal harvest in Oaxaca, public mural by Arturo Garcia Bustos, Mexico

Workers collect the female cochineal insects from their host plants. The insects are killed by immersion in hot water or by exposure to sunlight, steam, or the heat of an oven. Each method produces a different color that results in the varied appearance of commercial cochineal. The insects must be dried to about 30% of their original body weight before they can be stored without decaying. It takes about 70,000 insects to make 1 pound (0.45 kilograms) of cochineal dye.

The two principal forms of cochineal dye are cochineal extract, a coloring made from the raw dried and pulverised bodies of insects, and carmine, a more purified coloring made from the cochineal. To prepare carmine, the powdered insect bodies are boiled in ammonia or a sodium carbonate solution, the insoluble matter is removed by filtering, and alum is added to the clear salt solution of carminic acid to precipitate the red aluminium salt. Purity of color is ensured by the absence of iron. Stannous chloride, citric acid, borax, or gelatin may be added to regulate the formation of the precipitate. For shades of purple, lime is added to the alum.

=== History ===
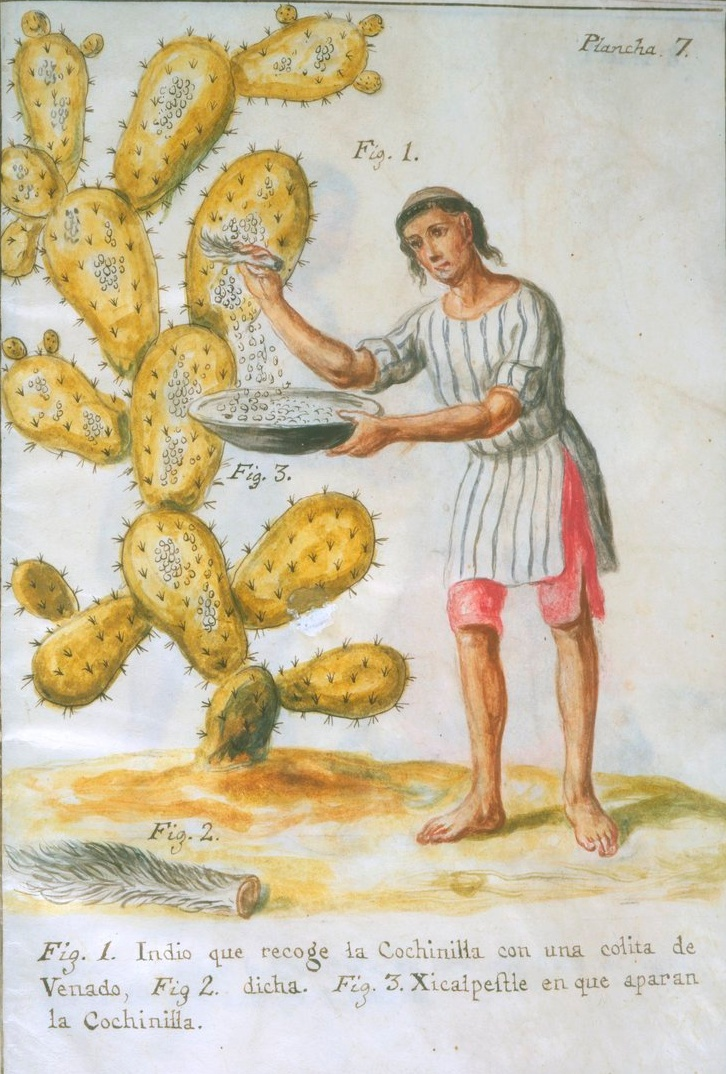
Mexican Indian Collecting Cochineal with a Deer Tail by José Antonio de Alzate y Ramírez (1777). The host plant is a prickly pear.

==== Pre-Columbian dye ====
Traditionally, cochineal was used by Indigenous peoples of Mesoamerica, including Mixtec, Zapotec, Aztec, and Otomi cultures, for coloring fabrics and amate paper. Cochineal dye was used as early as the second century BC. People began to paint codices with cochineal as early as the thirteenth century.

Although cochineal could be harvested from wild species, people began to intentionally grow cochineal in gardens. This semi-domesticated species had more dye, which made it more valuable to artists.

Cochineal's importance in Mesoamerica is indicated by its prominence in tribute lists such as the Matrícula de Tributos. Eleven towns in the Oaxacan province of Coixtlahuaca, conquered by the Aztec Empire in the 15th century, paid a yearly tribute of 2000 decorated cotton blankets and 40 bags of cochineal dye each. One of these towns was called Nochistlan (today Asuncion Nochixtlan, after the Nahuatl term for cochineal, "nocheztli".

Inhabitants of Peru have been producing cochineal dyes for textiles since early in the Middle Horizon period (600–1000 CE). Cochineal dye was extensively used in the Pre-Columbian era, often for ceremonial textiles and those worn by rulers.

The dye bonds best with animal fibers rather than plant fibers and was most effective for dyeing wool from alpacas and other Camelidae, rabbit fur, and feathers. It was also used on cottons and plant-based fabrics, to less effect. Some examples of early cloth have survived in extremely dry areas in Peru. In addition, the use of cochineal is illustrated in drawings on codices and maps. Production of cochineal dyes became well-developed under Nazca culture, and beautiful examples of woven cloth colored by cochineal remain from Moche and Wari culture.

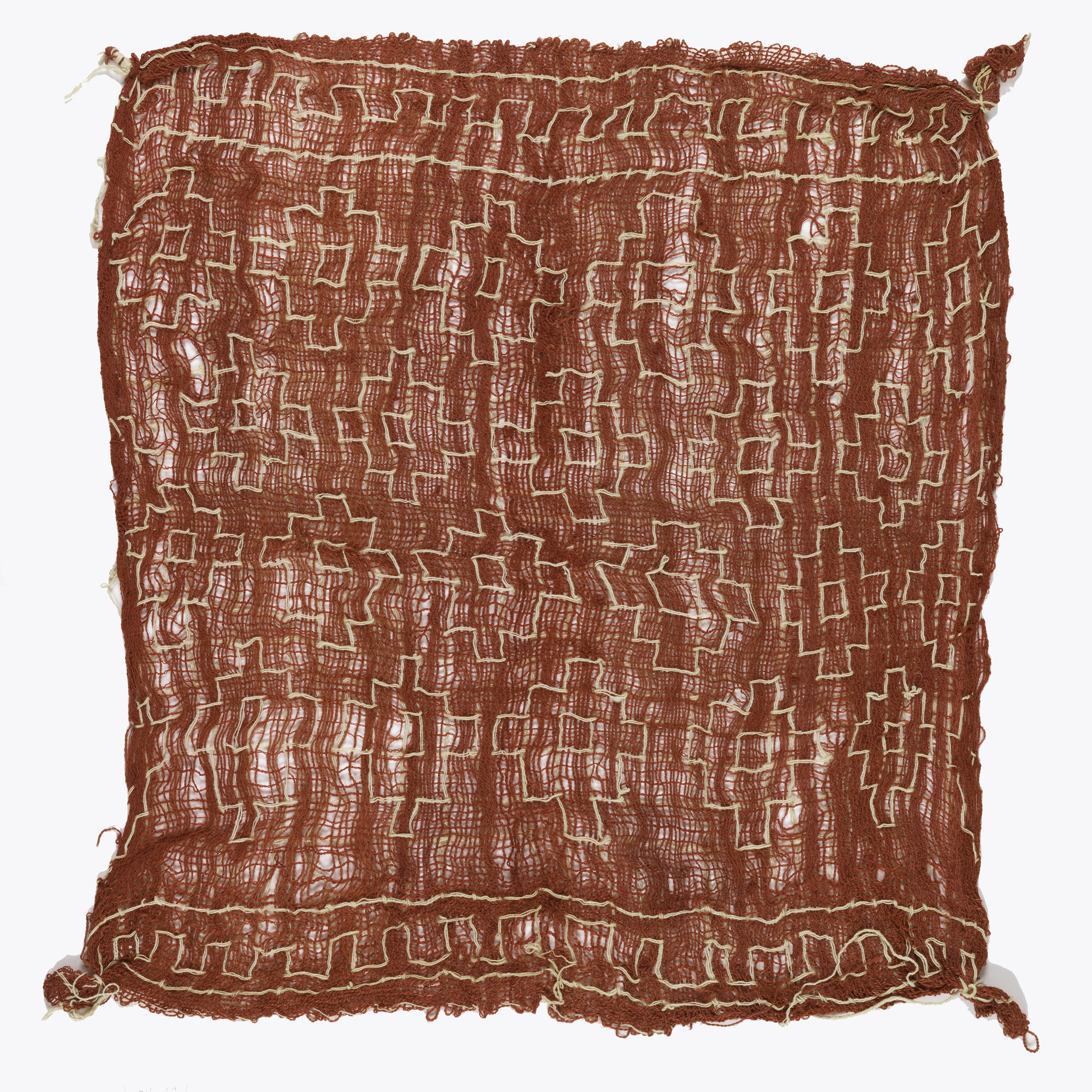
Carrying Cloth (Peru), c. 600–1000 AD

Moche-Wari Yoke from a Tunic, c. 800-1200 AD

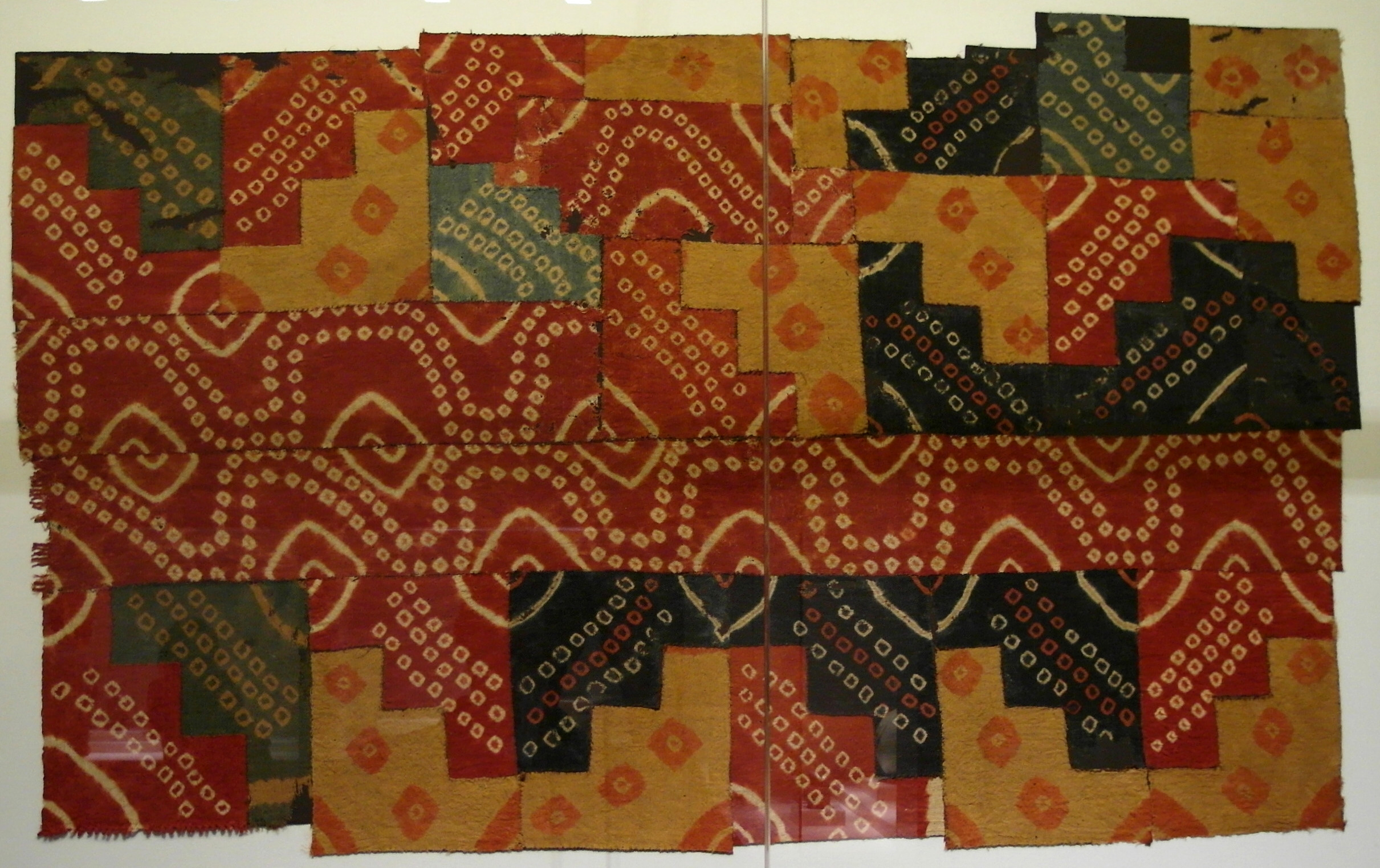
Pre-Columbian textile from Peru, c. 800-1300 AD

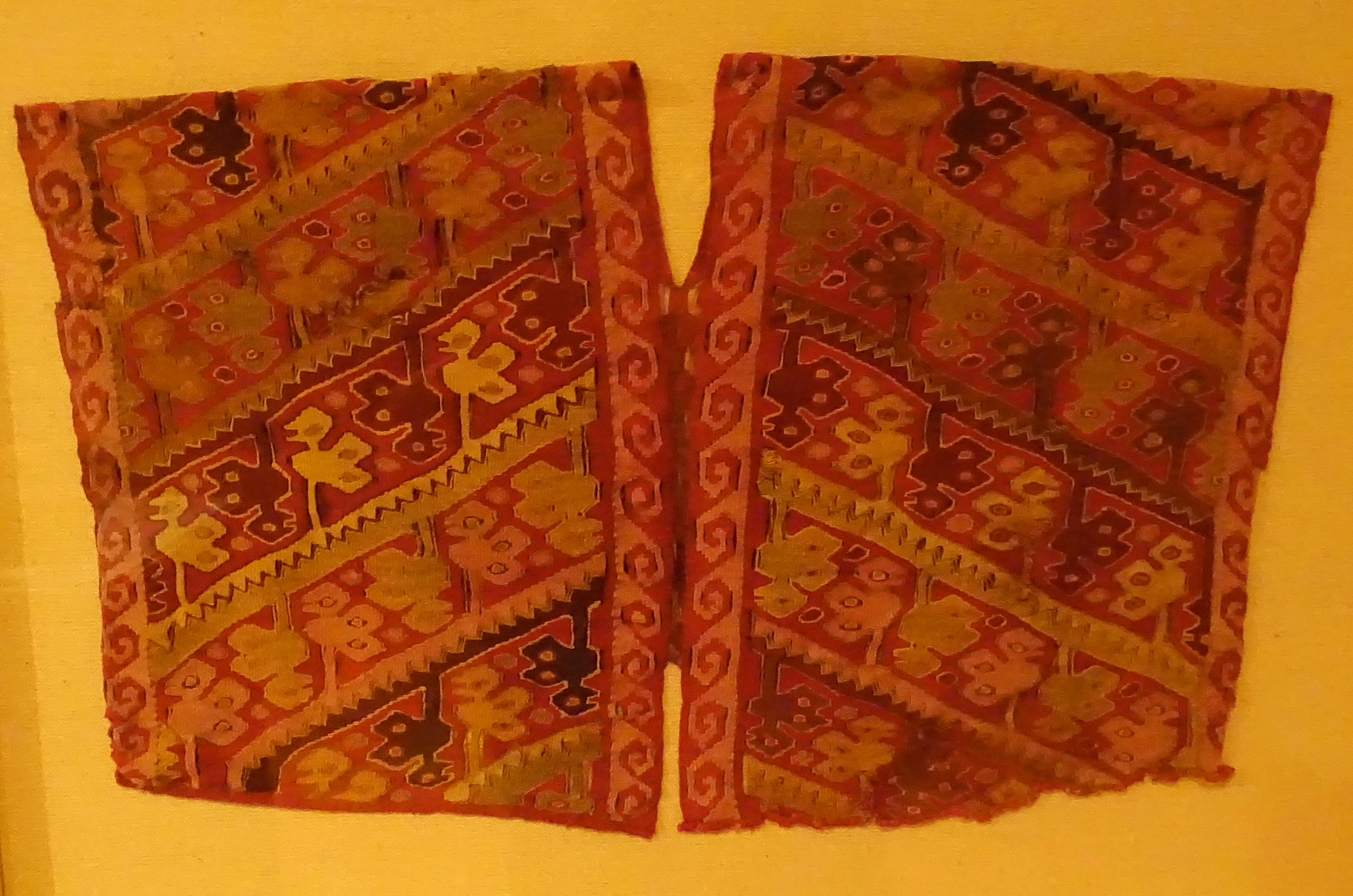
Tapestry shirt fragment, Peru, Chancay, c. 1000-1470 AD

==== Use as pigment ====
Prior to the Spanish invasion, Aztecs also used cochineal pigments in their manuscripts. The 16th century Florentine Codex contains a variety of illustrations with multiple variations of the red pigments. Specifically in the case of achiotl (light red), technical analysis of the paint reveals multiple layers of the pigment although the layering of the pigment is not visible to the naked eye. Therefore, it proves that the process of applying multiple layers is more significant in comparison to the actual color itself. Furthermore, the process of layering the various hues of the same pigment on top of each other enabled the Aztec artists to create variations in the intensity of the subject matter. A bolder application of pigment draws the viewer's eye to the subject matter which commands attention and suggests a power of the viewer. A weaker application of pigment commands less attention and has less power. This would suggest that the Aztec associated the intensity of pigments with the idea of power and life.

Pigments are insoluble finely ground particles which are mixed with a liquid to make a paint. To be useful as a pigment, a substance should be insoluble in the vehicle with which it is mixed, in contrast to a dye which is soluble. The activity of carmines can vary widely depending on their preparation and composition: they tend to be unstable and can vary in solubility depending on pH.

Recipes for artists' use of crimson appear in many early painting and alchemical handbooks throughout the Middle Ages. Red lake pigments were known to be particularly unstable as early as the 1400s. When cochineal lakes were introduced in Europe, artists soon found that they were not light-fast. The paint turns brown and fades in sunlight, although it is somewhat more permanent if mixed with oil rather than water color. As a result, carmine's use as a pigment was discouraged: its primary use was as a dye rather than in paints.

"Beautiful and rich as are the colours prepared from cochineal, not one of them should ever find a place upon the palette of the artist. They all become brownish and ultimately almost disappear after a short exposure to sunlight or the more prolonged attack of strong diffused daylight", Arthur Herbert Church

==== Comparable colors ====
Cochineal was also produced in Europe from Polish cochineal and in West Asia from Armenian cochineal. Both of these contain carminic acid and small amounts of kermesic acid. Another red pigment used in Europe and extracted from hemipteran insects in the suborder Sternorrhyncha is Kermes (technically, crimson), one of the oldest organic pigments. Its key ingredient, kermesic acid, was extracted from Kermes vermilio, which lives on Quercus coccifera oaks native to the Near East, and the European side of the Mediterranean Basin. Kermes was used as a dye and a laked pigment in ancient Egypt, Greece, Armenia and the Near East.

==== Colonial production export ====
The Spanish conquest of the Aztec Empire in the 16th century introduced new colors to peoples on both sides of the Atlantic. The Spanish were quick to exploit the vibrant, intense color of cochineal for new trade opportunities. Carmine attained great status and value in Europe. Cochineal was intentionally cultivated for export in many regions of Mesoamerica but was especially important in Tlaxcala, Puebla, and Oaxaca.

During the colonial period, with the introduction of sheep to Latin America, cochineal gained another important use. It provided the most intense color and it set more firmly on woolen garments compared to clothes made of materials of pre-Hispanic origin such as cotton or agave and yucca fibers. In general, cochineal is more successful on protein-based animal fibres (including silk) than plant-based material.

Once the European market discovered the qualities of this product (grana fina), the demand for it increased dramatically. Carmine became the region's second-most-valuable export next to silver. The dyestuff was used throughout Europe and was so highly prized, its price was regularly quoted on the London and Amsterdam Commodity Exchanges (with the latter one beginning to record it in 1589). By the 17th century cochineal was a commodity traded as far away as India.

The production and the use of luxury colors and textiles were regulated in countries such as Spain and Italy. Dyestuffs produced from the cochineal insect were used for dyeing the clothes of kings, nobles, and the clergy. In 1454, Pope Paul II officially changed the color of the robes worn by Catholic cardinals from "Cardinal's purple" to vibrant red. By 1558, their red robes would have been created with American cochineal. By the 1600s, cochineal also gave the English "Redcoats" their distinctive officers' uniforms. Carmine became strong competition for other colorants such as madder root, kermes, Polish cochineal, Armenian cochineal, brazilwood, and Tyrian purple. It became the most important insect dye used in the production of hand-woven oriental rugs, almost completely displacing lac. It was also used for handicrafts, and tapestries.

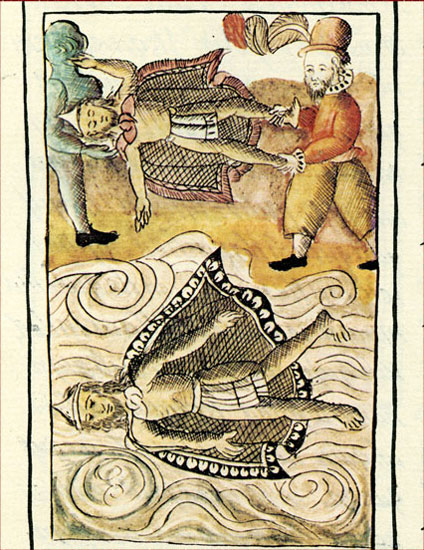
Moctezuma dead in the waters of the grand canal

Spanish influence also changed the way in which Aztecs used pigments, particularly in their manuscripts. The use of cochineal in manuscripts was complemented by Spanish pigments like minium and The image of Moctezuma's death (seen to the right) uses both indigenous and Spanish pigments. The scholar Diana Magaloni Kerpel argues that the presence of cochineal and minium in this 16th century image is representative of the transition and influence between cultures.

During the colonial period in Latin America, many indigenous communities produced cochineal under a type of contract known as Repartimiento de Mercancías. This was a type of "contract forwarding" agreement, in which a trader lent money to producers in advance, with a "call option" to buy the product once it was harvested. Communities with a history of cochineal production and export have been found to have lower poverty rates and higher female literacy, but also smaller indigenous populations.

==== Production elsewhere ====
In 1777, French botanist Nicolas-Joseph Thiéry de Menonville, presenting himself as a botanizing physician, smuggled the insects and pads of the Opuntia cactus to Saint Domingue. This particular collection failed to thrive and ultimately died out, leaving the Mexican monopoly intact. After the Mexican War of Independence in 1810–1821, the Mexican monopoly on cochineal came to an end. Large-scale production of cochineal emerged, especially in Guatemala and the Canary Islands; it was also cultivated in Spain and North Africa.

==== Competition from artificial dyes ====
The demand for cochineal fell sharply in the middle of the 19th century, with the appearance of artificial dyes such as alizarin crimson. This caused a significant financial shock in Spain as a major industry almost ceased to exist. The delicate manual labour required for the breeding of the insect could not compete with the modern methods of the new industry, and even less so with the lowering of production costs. The "tuna blood" dye (from the Mexican name for the Opuntia fruit) stopped being used and trade in cochineal almost totally disappeared in the course of the 20th century. For a time, the breeding of cochineal was done mainly for the purposes of maintaining the tradition rather than to satisfy any sort of demand.

However, the product has become commercially valuable again. One reason for the increasing interest in natural dyes is consumer concern over the possibility that some commercial synthetic red dyes and food colorings may be carcinogenic. Being natural is not a guarantee of safety, but studies show that cochineal is neither carcinogenic nor toxic. Cochineal does, however, have a slight potential to trigger an allergic reaction.

=== Modern uses ===
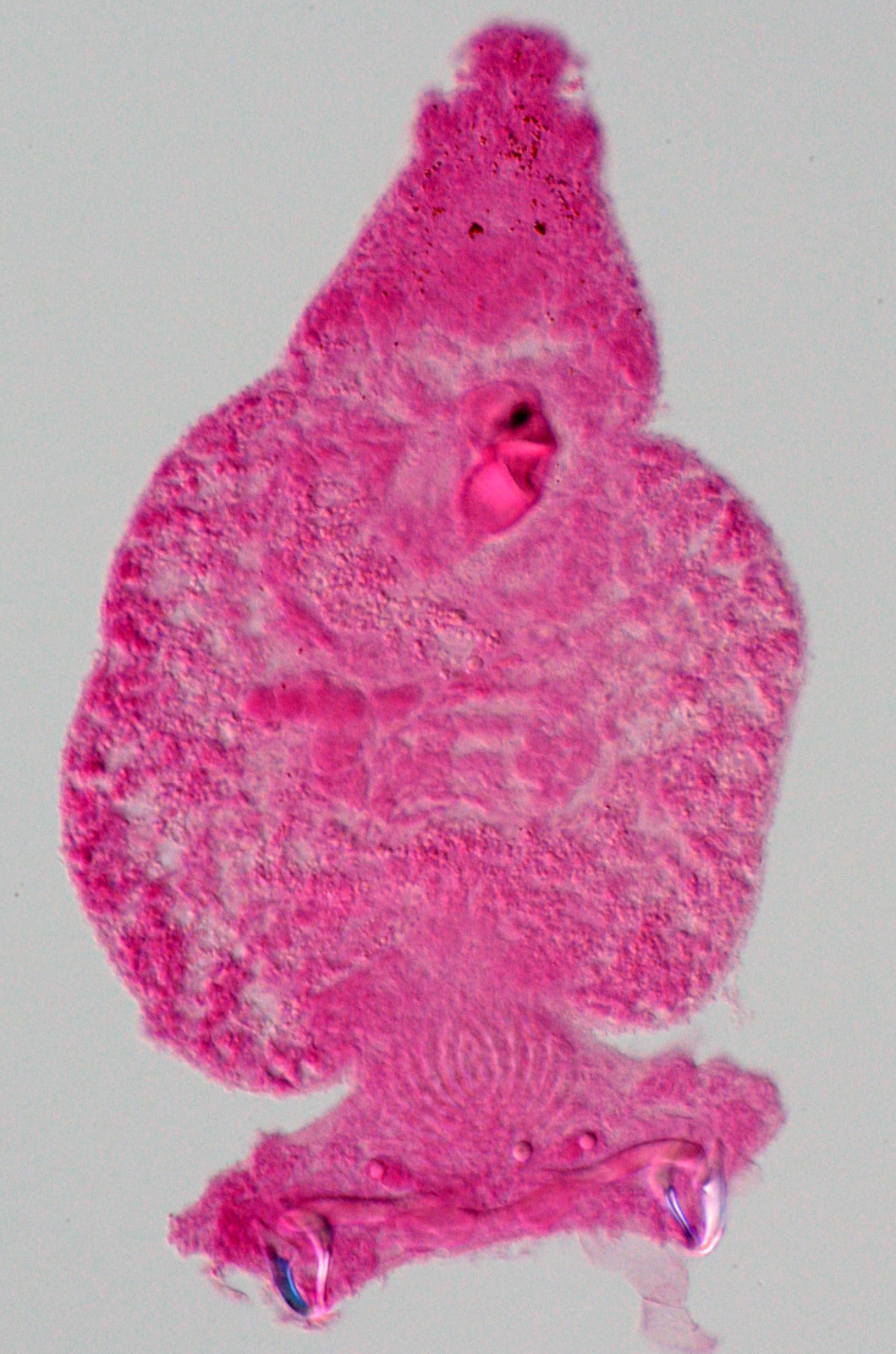
Cochineal use in histology: Carmine staining of a monogenean (parasitic worm)

Cochineal continues to be used as a fabric dye, a cosmetics dye and as a food coloring. It is also used in histology as a preparatory stain for the examination of tissues and carbohydrates.

As of 2005, Peru produced 200 tons of cochineal dye per year and the Canary Islands produced 20 tons per year. Chile and Mexico also export cochineal. France is believed to be the world's largest importer, and Japan and Italy also import the insect. Much of these imports are processed and re-exported to other developed economies. As of 2005, the market price of cochineal was between US$50 and 80 per kilogram, while synthetic raw food dyes are available at prices as low as $10–20 per kilogram.

Natural carmine dye used in food and cosmetics can render the product unacceptable to vegetarian or vegan consumers. Many Muslims consider carmine-containing food forbidden (haraam) because the dye is extracted from insects and all insects except the locust are haram in Islam. Jews also avoid food containing this additive, though it is not treif, and some authorities allow its use because the insect is dried and reduced to powder.

Cochineal is one of the few water-soluble colorants to resist degradation with time. It is one of the most light- and heat-stable and oxidation-resistant of all the natural organic colorants and is even more stable than many synthetic food colors. The water-soluble form, cochineal extract, is used in a wide variety of beverages; the insoluble form, carmine, is used in a wide variety of products. They can be found in meat, sausages, processed poultry products (meat products cannot be colored in the United States unless they are labeled as such), surimi, marinades, alcoholic drinks, bakery products and toppings, cookies, desserts, icings, pie fillings, jams, preserves, gelatin desserts, juice beverages, varieties of cheddar cheese and other dairy products, sauces, and sweets.

Carmine is considered safe enough for cosmetic use in the eye area. A significant proportion of the insoluble carmine pigment produced is used in the cosmetics industry for hair- and skin-care products, lipsticks, face powders, rouges, and blushes. A bright red dye and the stain carmine used in microbiology is often made from the carmine extract, too. The pharmaceutical industry uses cochineal to color pills and ointments.

Cochineal-colored wool and cotton continue to be important materials for Mexican folk art and crafts. Some towns in the Mexican state of Oaxaca continue to follow traditional practices of producing and using cochineal when making handmade textiles. In Guatemala, Heifer International has partnered with local women who wished to reintroduce traditional artisanal practices of cochineal production and use.

Because it has a complicated structure involving multiple chemical groups, it is very difficult to create a synthetic molecule for cochineal. In 1991, carminic acid was first synthesized in the laboratory by organic chemists. In 2018, researchers genetically engineered the fungus Aspergillus nidulans to produce carminic acid; the bacterium Escherichia coli was engineered to produce carminic acid in 2021.

==== Risks and labeling ====
In spite of the widespread use of carmine-based dyes in food and cosmetic products, a small number of people have been found to experience occupational asthma, food allergy and cosmetic allergies (such as allergic rhinitis and cheilitis), IgE-mediated respiratory hypersensitivity, and in rare cases anaphylactic shock. In 2009, the FDA ruled that labels of cosmetics and food that include cochineal extract must include that information on their labels (under the name "cochineal extract" or "carmine"). In 2006, the FDA stated it found no evidence of a "significant hazard" to the general population. In the EU, authorities list carmine as additive E 120 in the list of EU-approved food additives. An artificial, non-allergenic cochineal dye is labeled E 124.

== See also ==
- Kermes (dye)
