= Red pigments =

Materials used to make red colors in painting

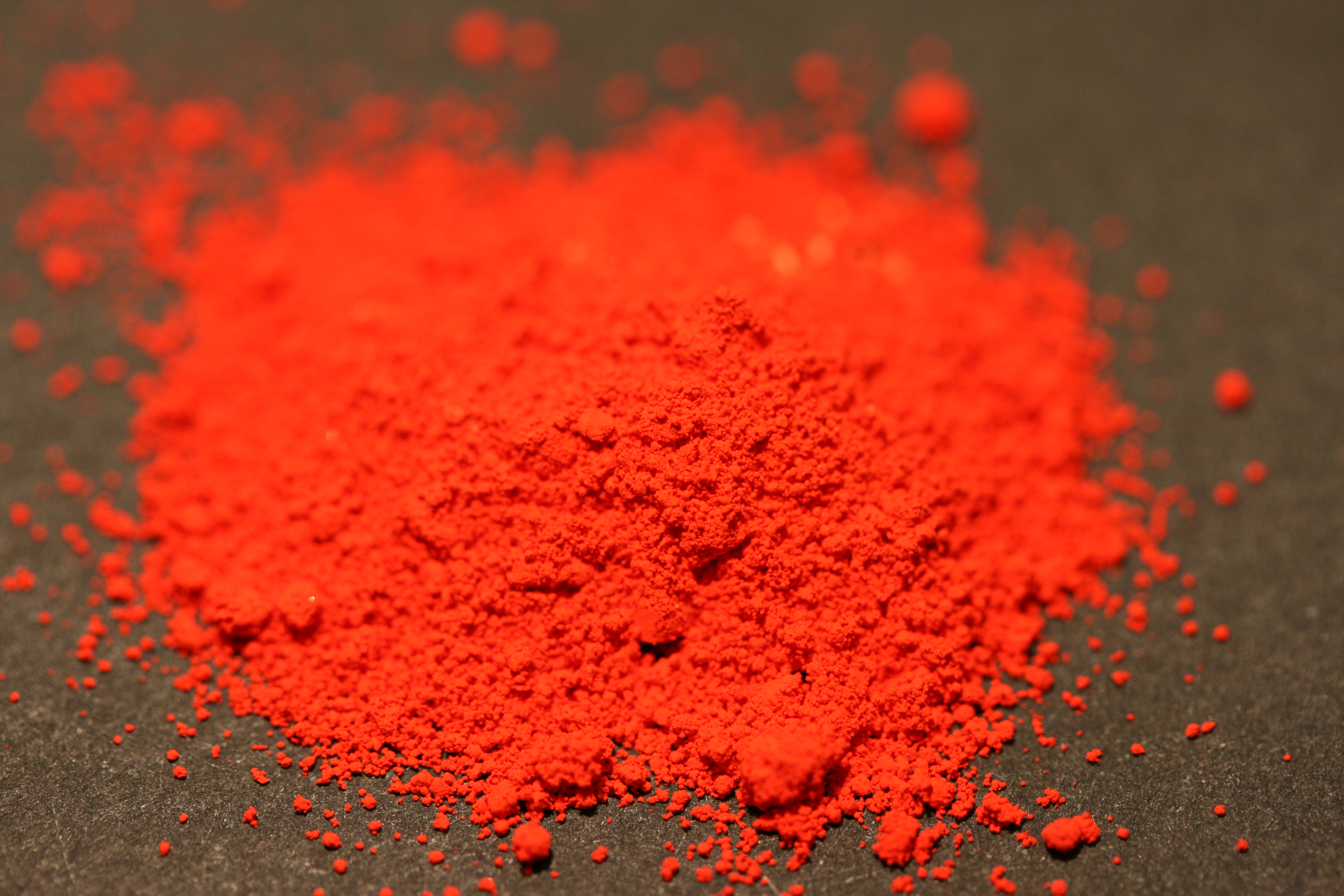
Cadmium red

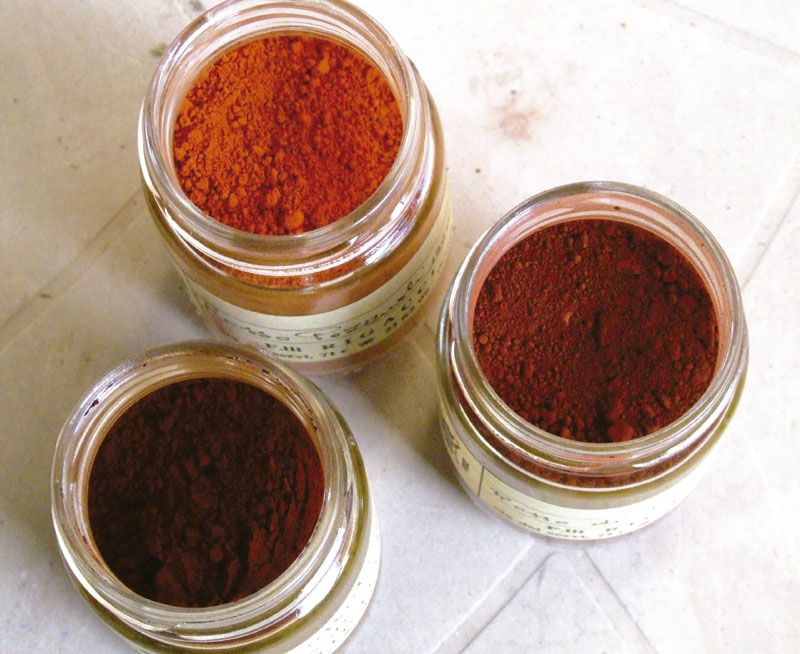
Natural red pigments

Red pigments are materials, usually made from minerals, used to create the red colors in painting and other arts. The color of red and other pigments is determined by the way it absorbs certain parts of the spectrum of visible light and reflects the others. The brilliant opaque red of vermillion, for example, results because vermillion reflects the major part of red light, but absorbs the blue, green and yellow parts of white light.

Red pigments historically were often made from iron oxides, such as hematite. These pigments have been found in cave paintings in France dating to between 16,000 and 25,000 BC. The bright scarlet color, vermilion, was made by pulverizing the mineral cinnabar. A synthetic Vermilion was created in the 9th century with a compound of mercury and sulfur. At present the great majority of red pigments are made artificially, rather than taken from nature.

More recently, pigments were created from dyestuffs from mineral and animal sources, The best known is cochineal, made from insects. Red Lake pigments are famous for their translucency. To paint richly-closed red fabrics, Medieval painters often used several layers of translucent lake colors over a base of lake mixed with lead white or vermillion.

== Red Ochre ==
Red ochre takes its reddish colour from the mineral hematite, which is an anhydrous iron oxide, and the main ingredient of rust. It was one of the earliest pigments used by man. Hand prints made by using red ochre have been found in the Pech Merle cave in Southern France. They date to between 16,000 and 25,000 BC.

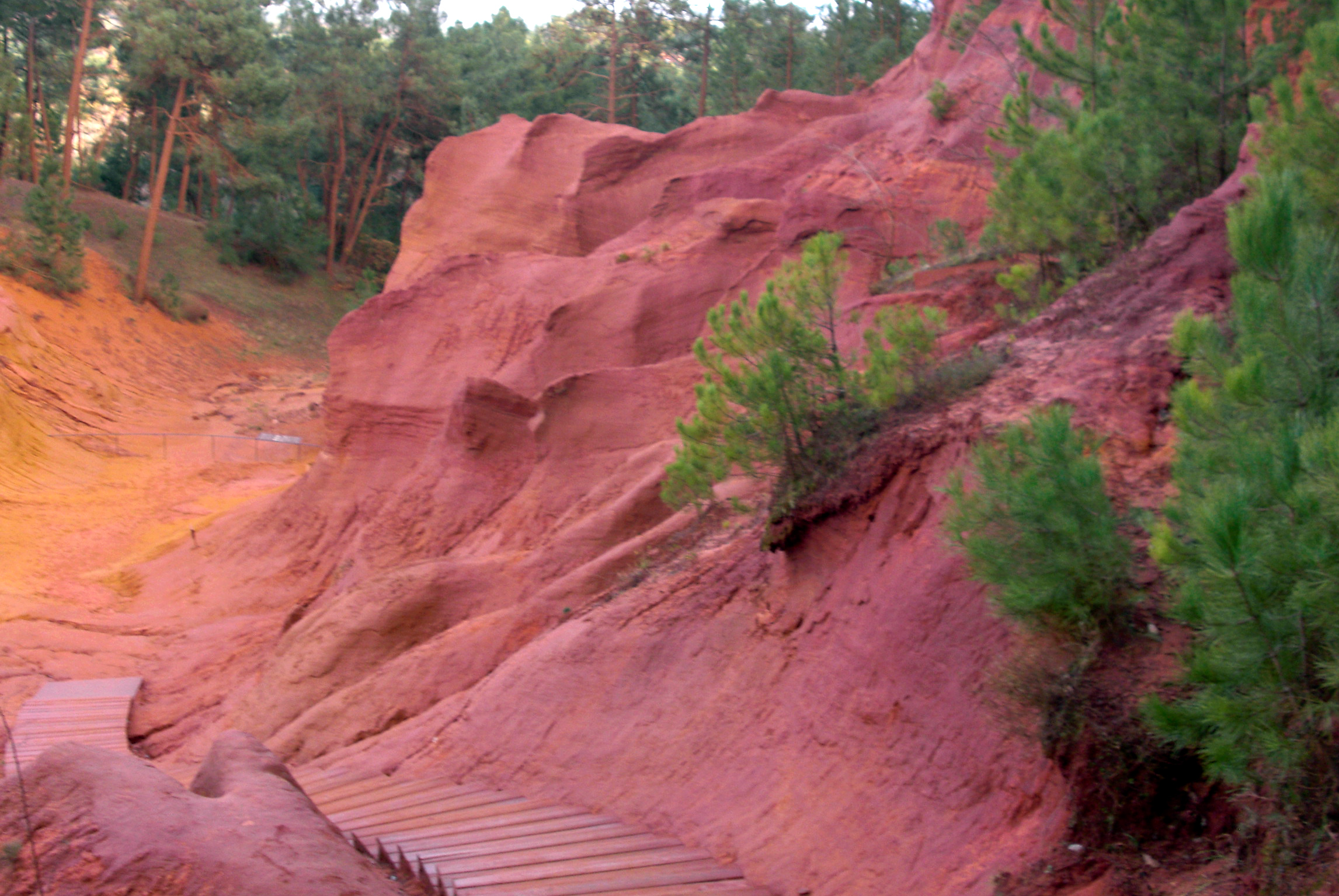
Red ochre mine near Roussillon in France

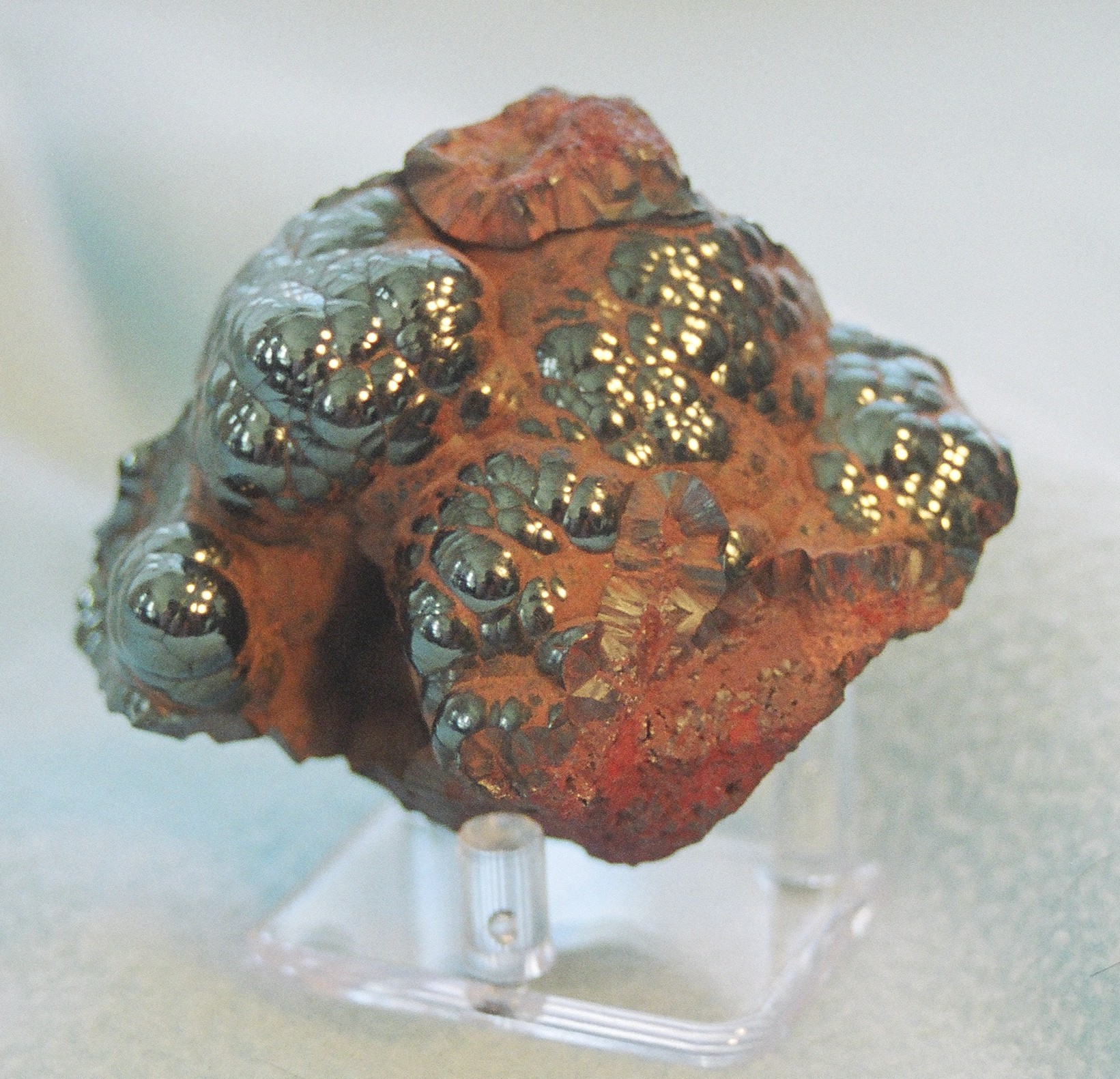
The mineral hematite, a form of iron oxide, is the primary ingredient of red ochre pigment,

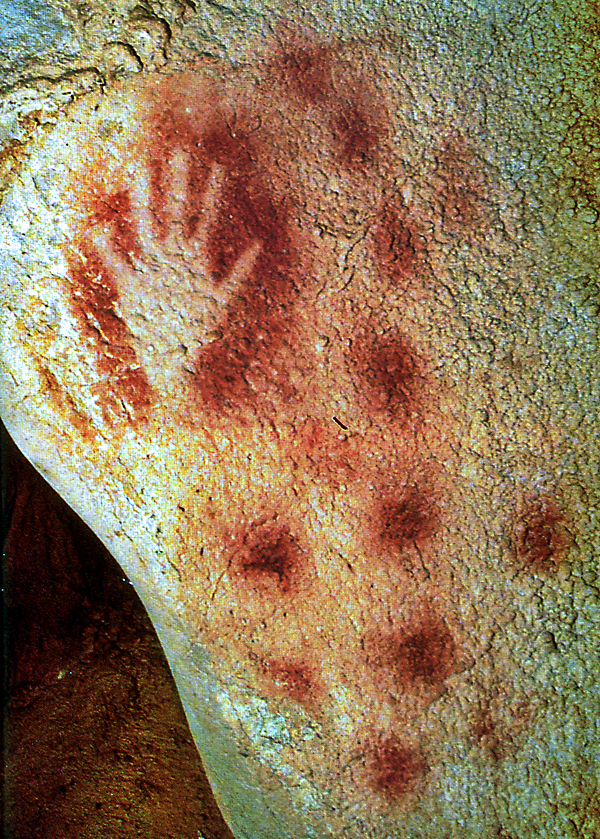
Prehistoric negative hand print in red ochre from Pech Merle Cave in Le Lot, France

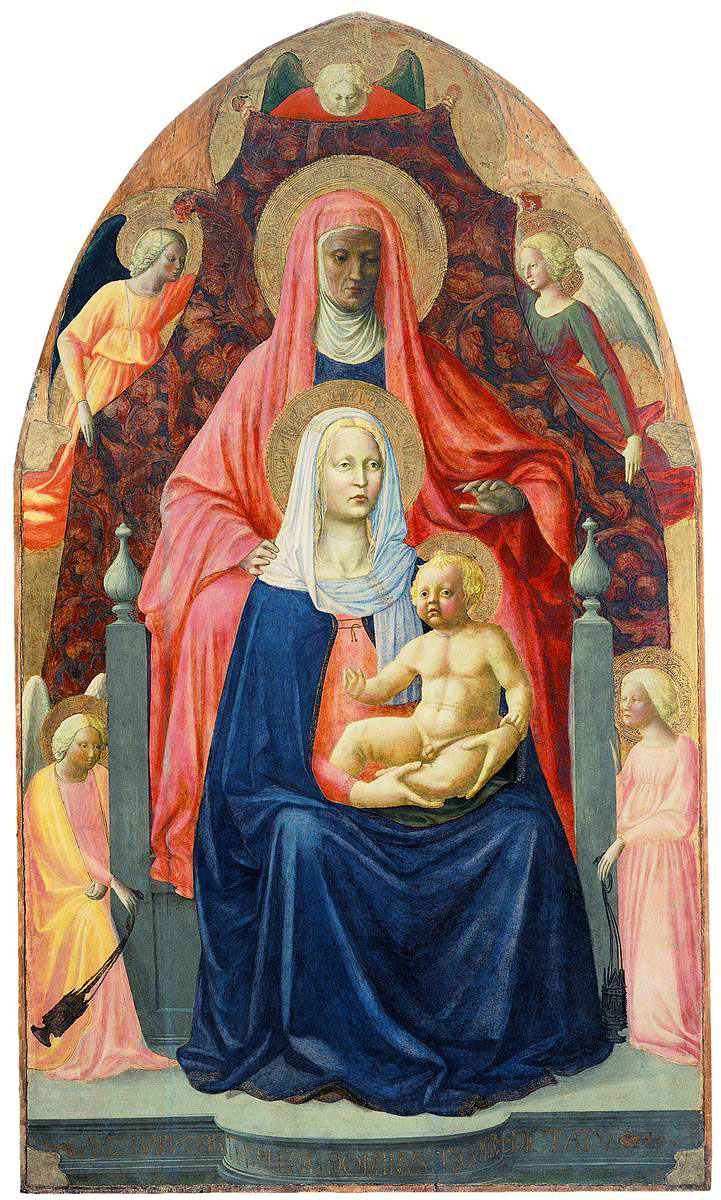
The Virgin with Saint Anne, by Masolino (1434–1425)

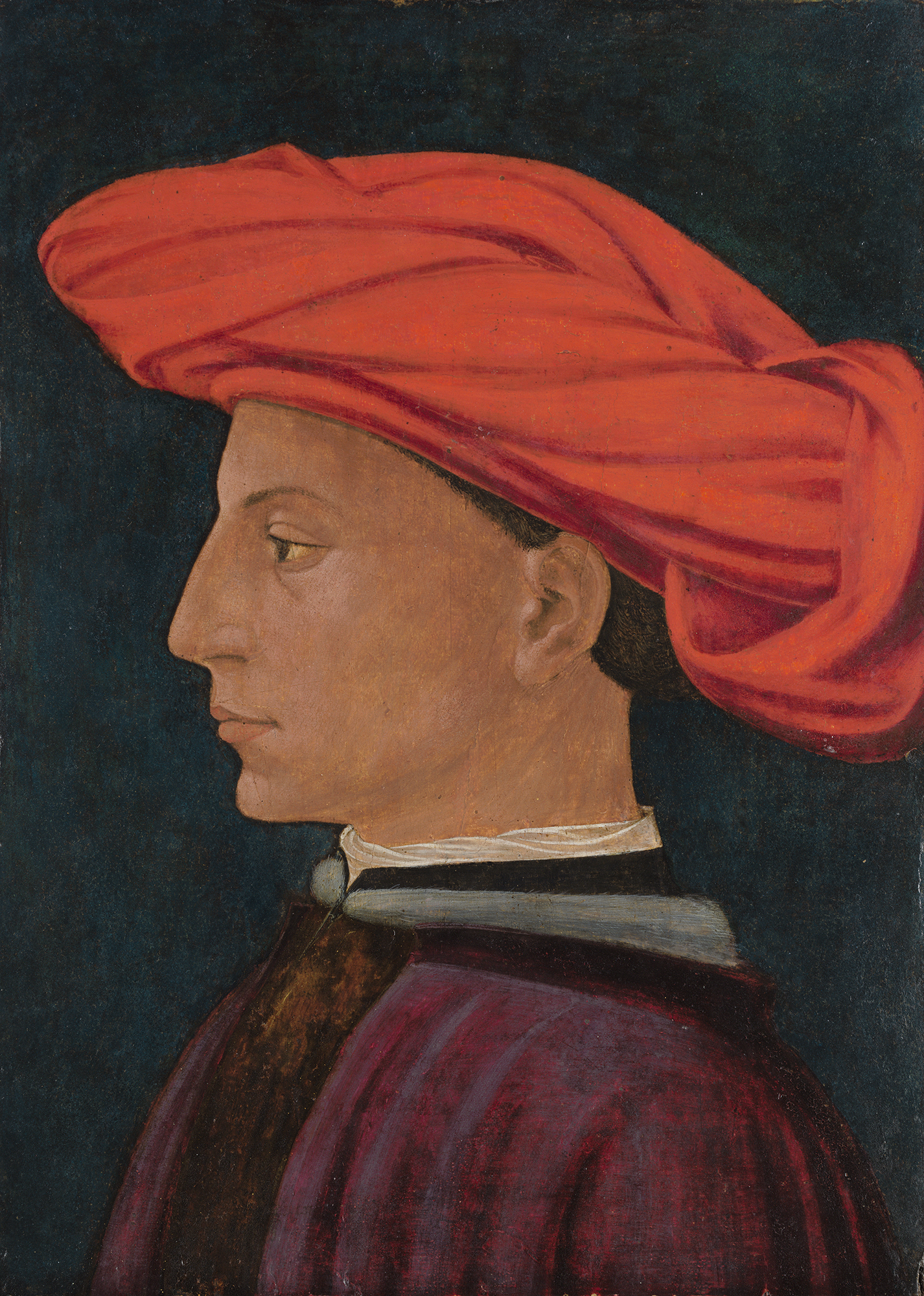
"Young man in a scarlet turban" by Masaccio (between 1425 and 1427)

== Vermilion ==
Vermilion is a very ancient red-orange pigment, made by pulverizing the mineral cinnabar. Its defect is that it is liable to darken with age, and sometimes develops a purple-red surface sheen, as seen in some paintings by Paolo Uccello, including the bridles of the horses depicted in "The Battle of San Romano" .

Vermilion also has a role in Indian culture. Hindu women wear a dab of vermilion on their forehead to indicate they are married.

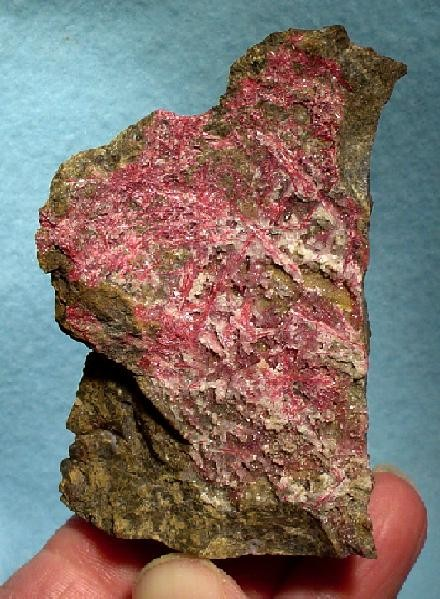
Cinnabar crystals, the source of Vermilion

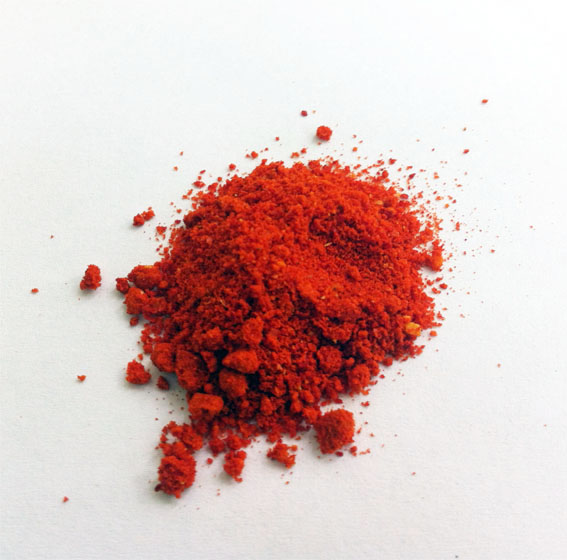
Vermilion

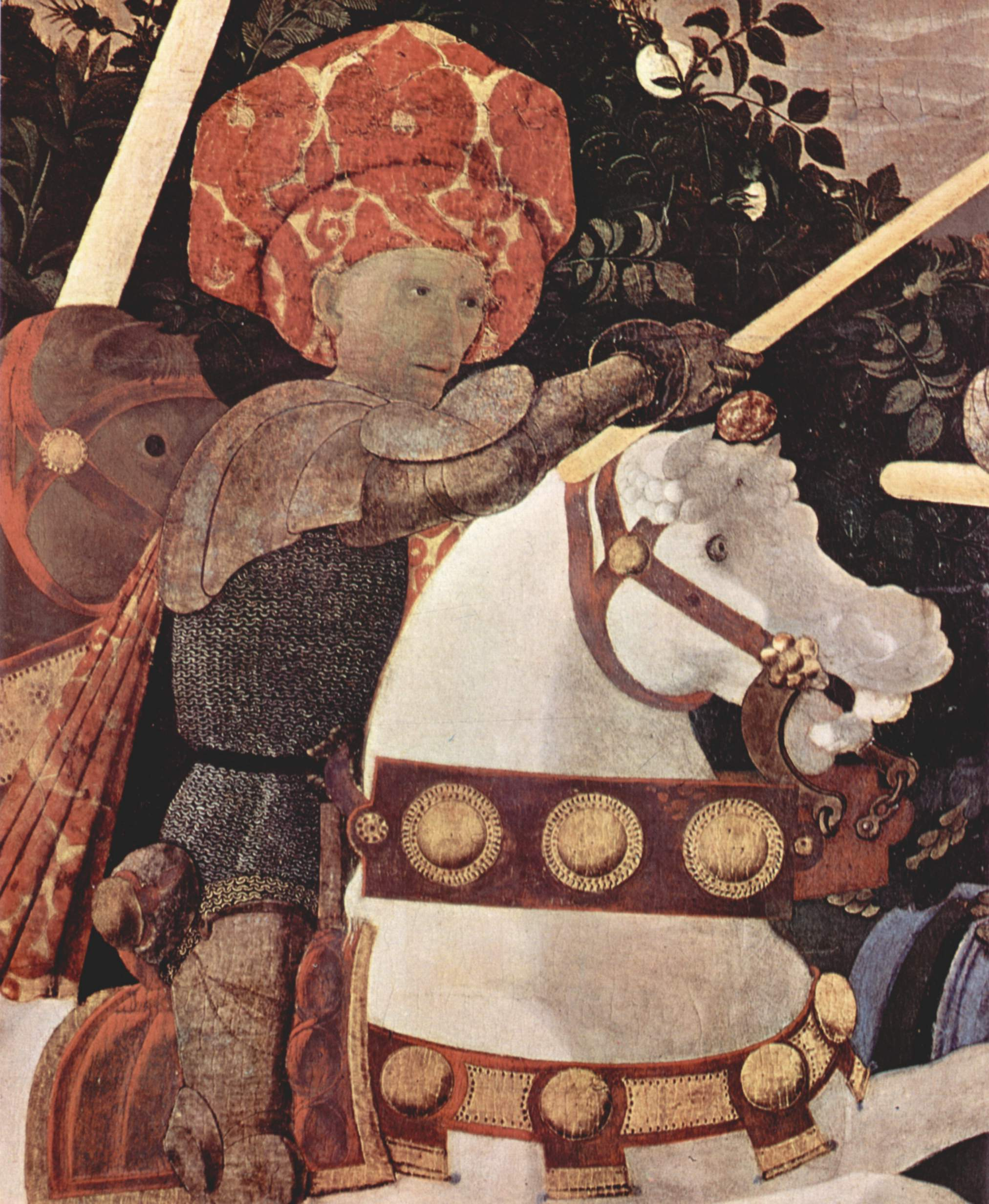
"The battle of San Romano", by Paolo Uccello *1439-1440)

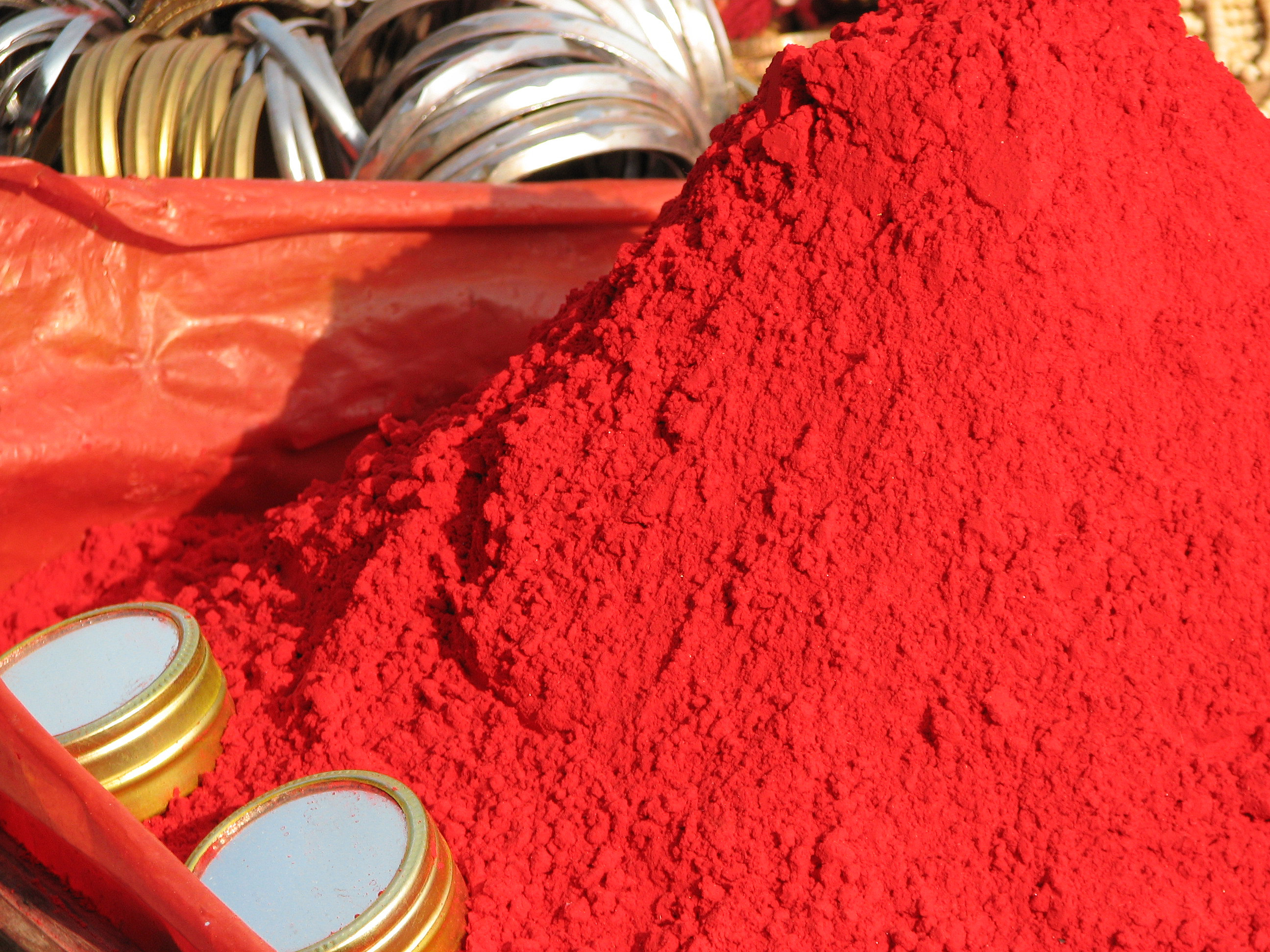
Sindoor, a vermilion pigment called Sindoor is worn by Indian women at the hairline of their foreheads to indicate they are married

== Cadmium red ==
Cadmium red is a byproduct of zinc ore. About half of the cadmium produced in the world has been used for making batteries for automobiles, and a large part of the other half is used for making a family of bright pigments, including cadmium orange and cadmium yellow. It is known for maintaining its brightness.

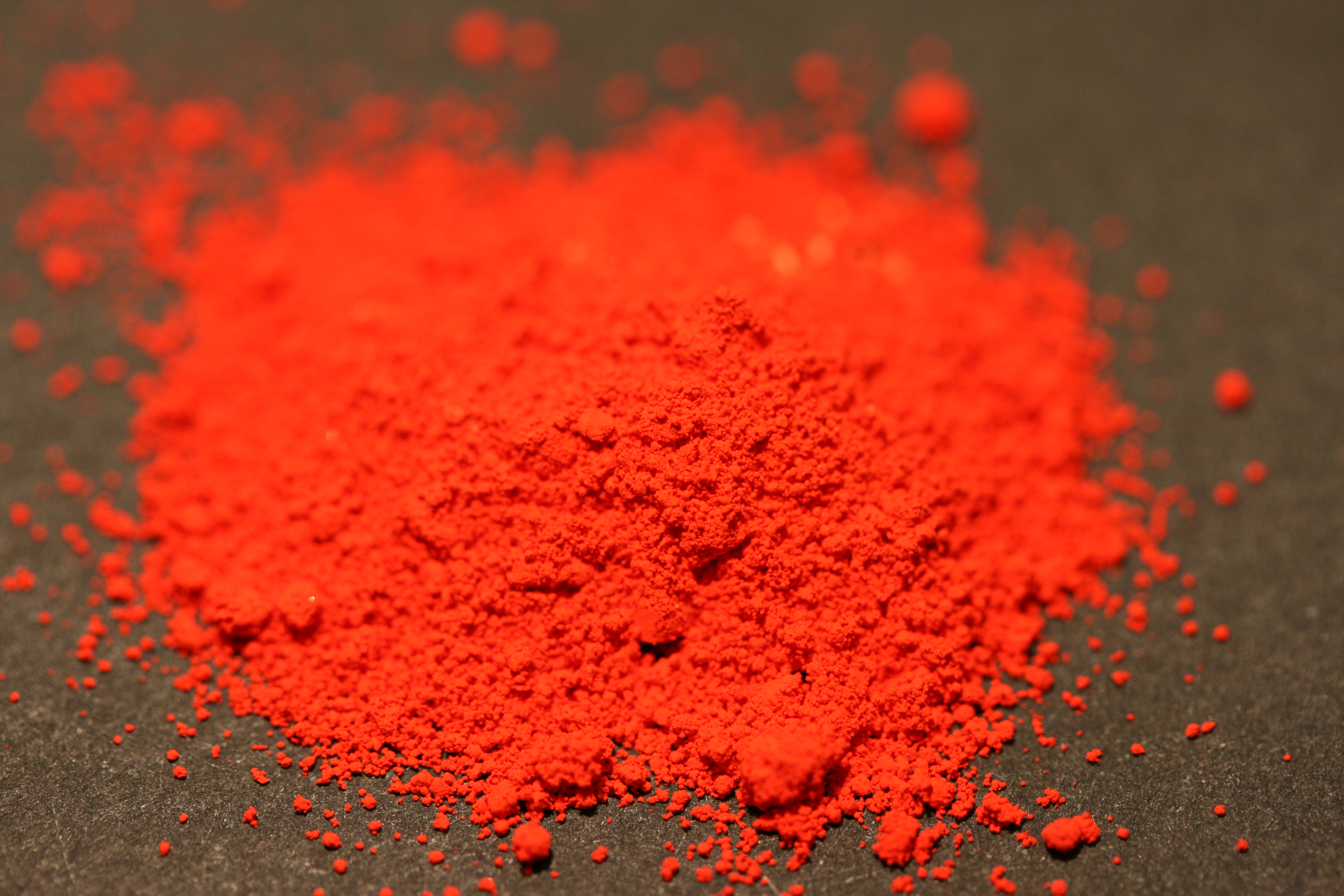
Cadmium Red

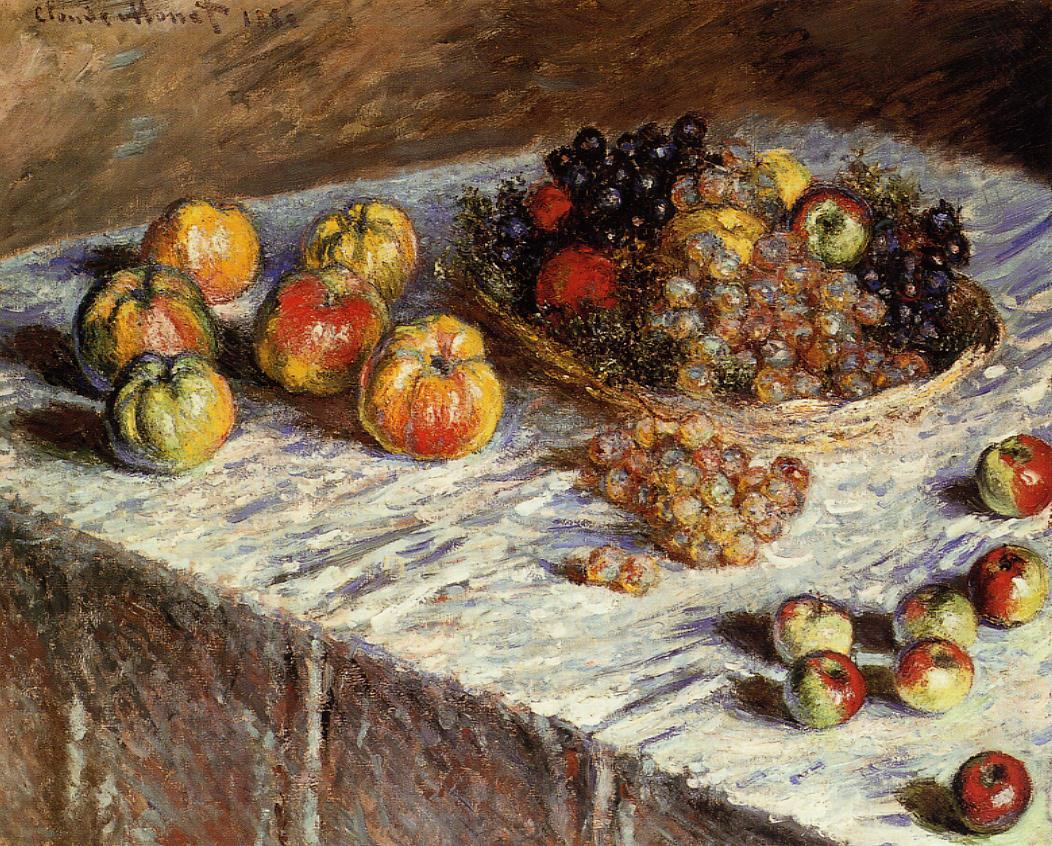
Cadmium red pigments used by Claude Monet (1880)

== Alizarin Crimson ==
Alizarin crimson is a vivid red pigment, inclined slightly toward purple, which was most widely used as a dye. It came from the Rubia tinctorum plant, commonly known as Madder. It has been found on fabrics in ancient Egyptian tombs, and its production in Europe was encouraged by Charlemagne for the early European textile industry.

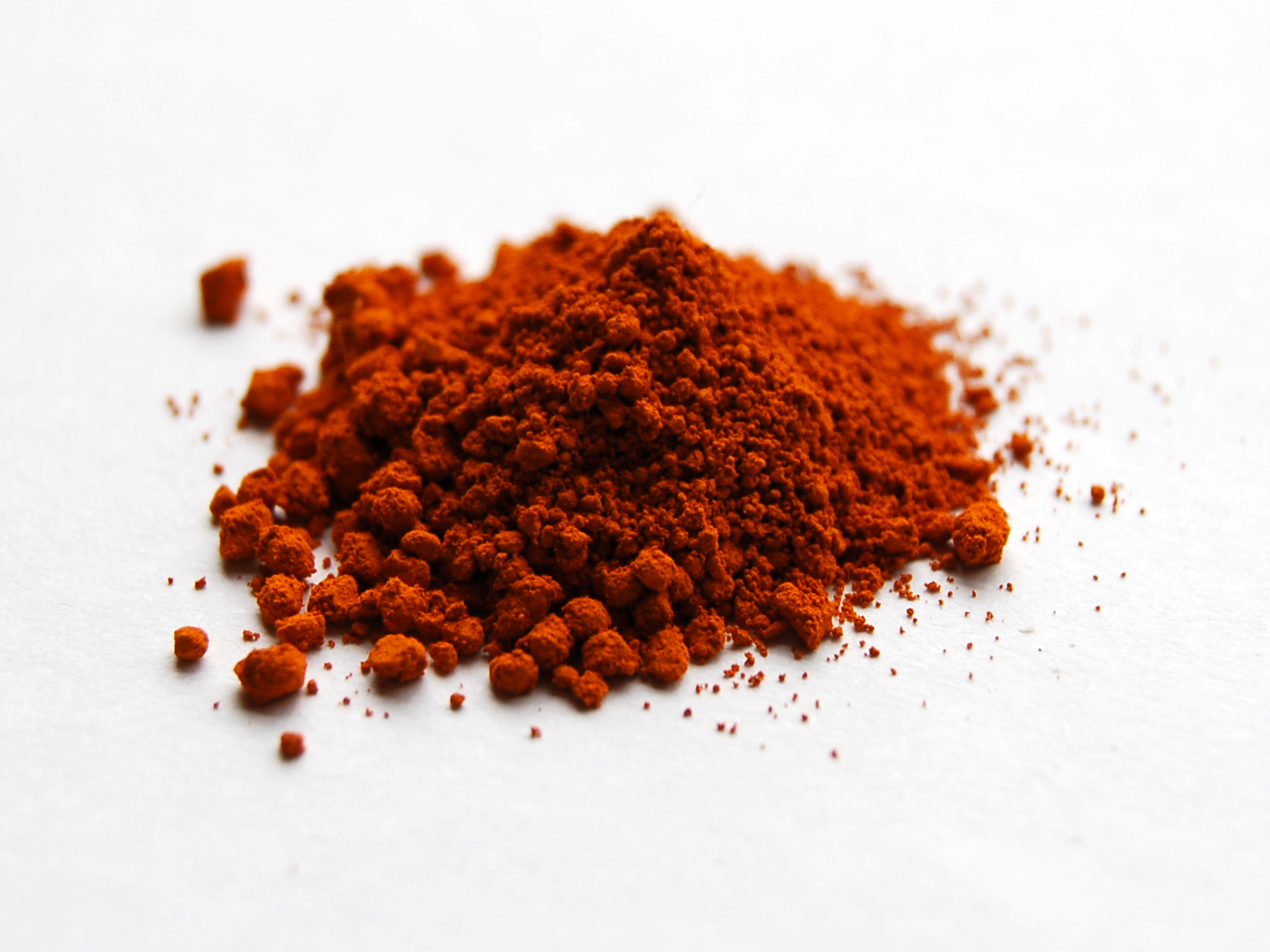
Alizarin pigment

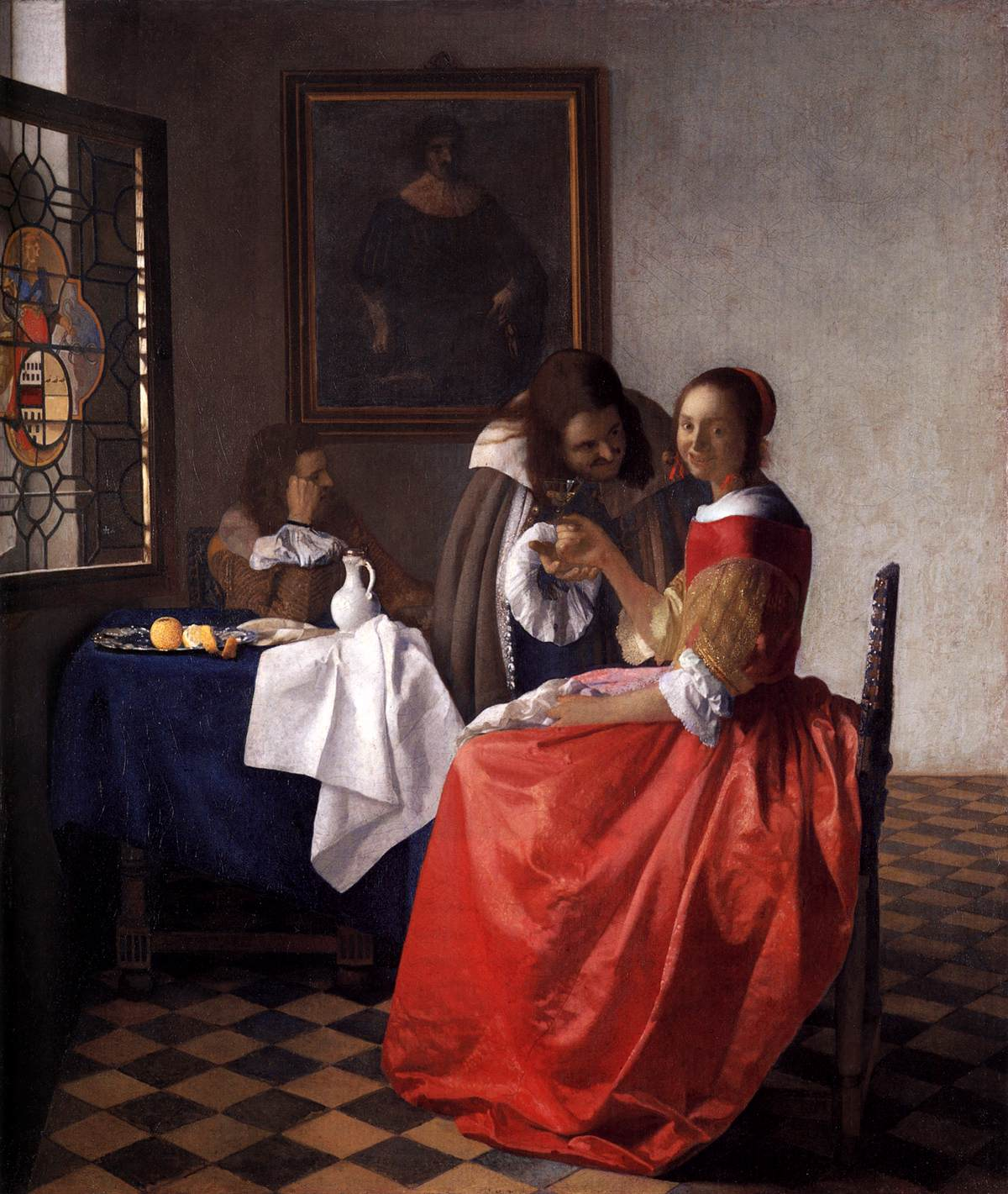
"A Lady and Two Gentlemen"" by Johannes Vermeer used Alizarin crimson for dramatic effect

== Chinese Red ==
Chinese red, a bright red color also known as Han Red for the Han dynasty. It had the same primary ingredient as the western color vermilion. It was used in China to color murals, architecture, clothing, and especially lacquerware. The Empress of China traveled in red carriages, and wore red costumes. In the Ming dynasty, (1368-1644), the color was featured in all official ceremonies, including sacrificial offerings, weddings, and departures of expeditions.

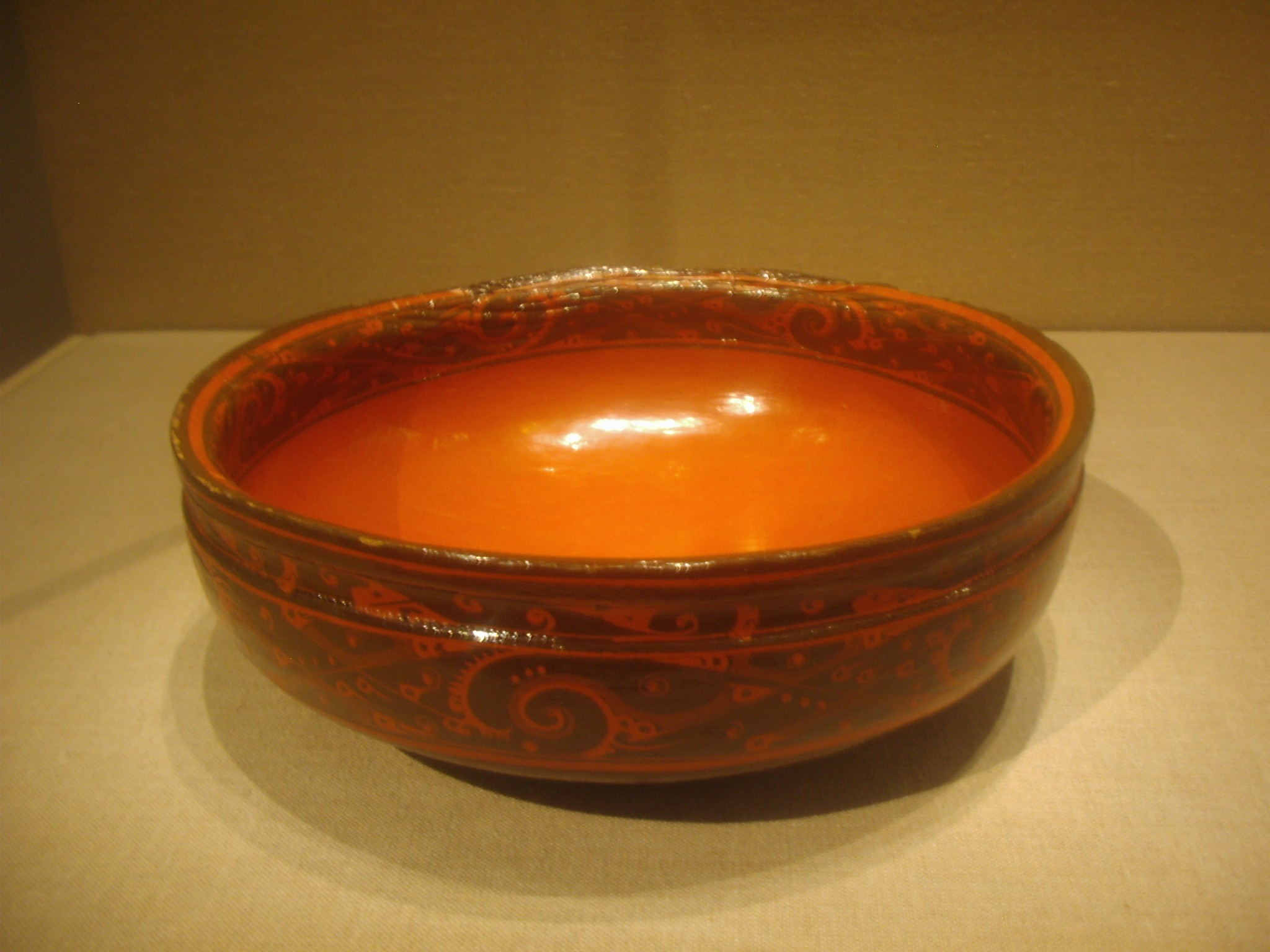
Chinese red lacquerware bowl (Han dynasty)

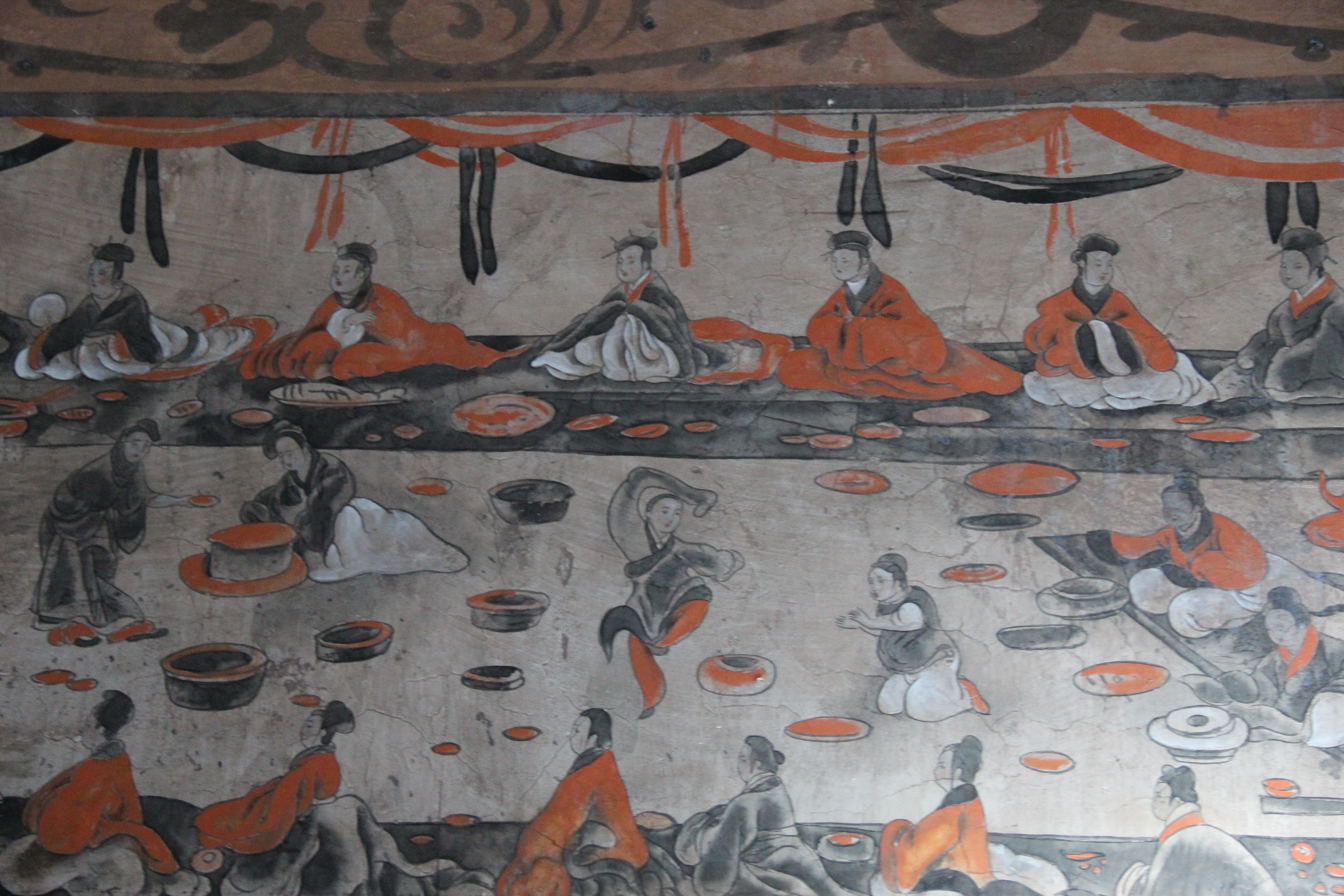
Murals in the tombs of Han dynasty

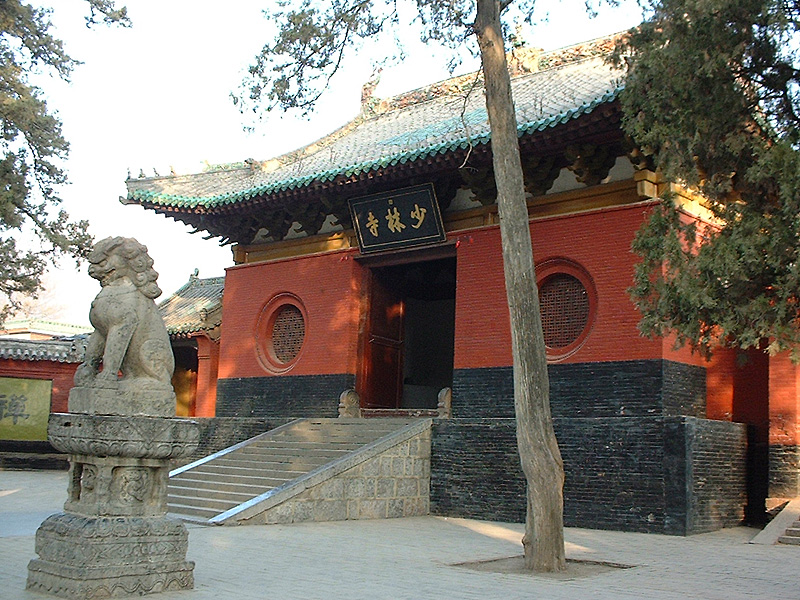
The main gate of Shaolin Monastery in Beijing, painted Chinese Red

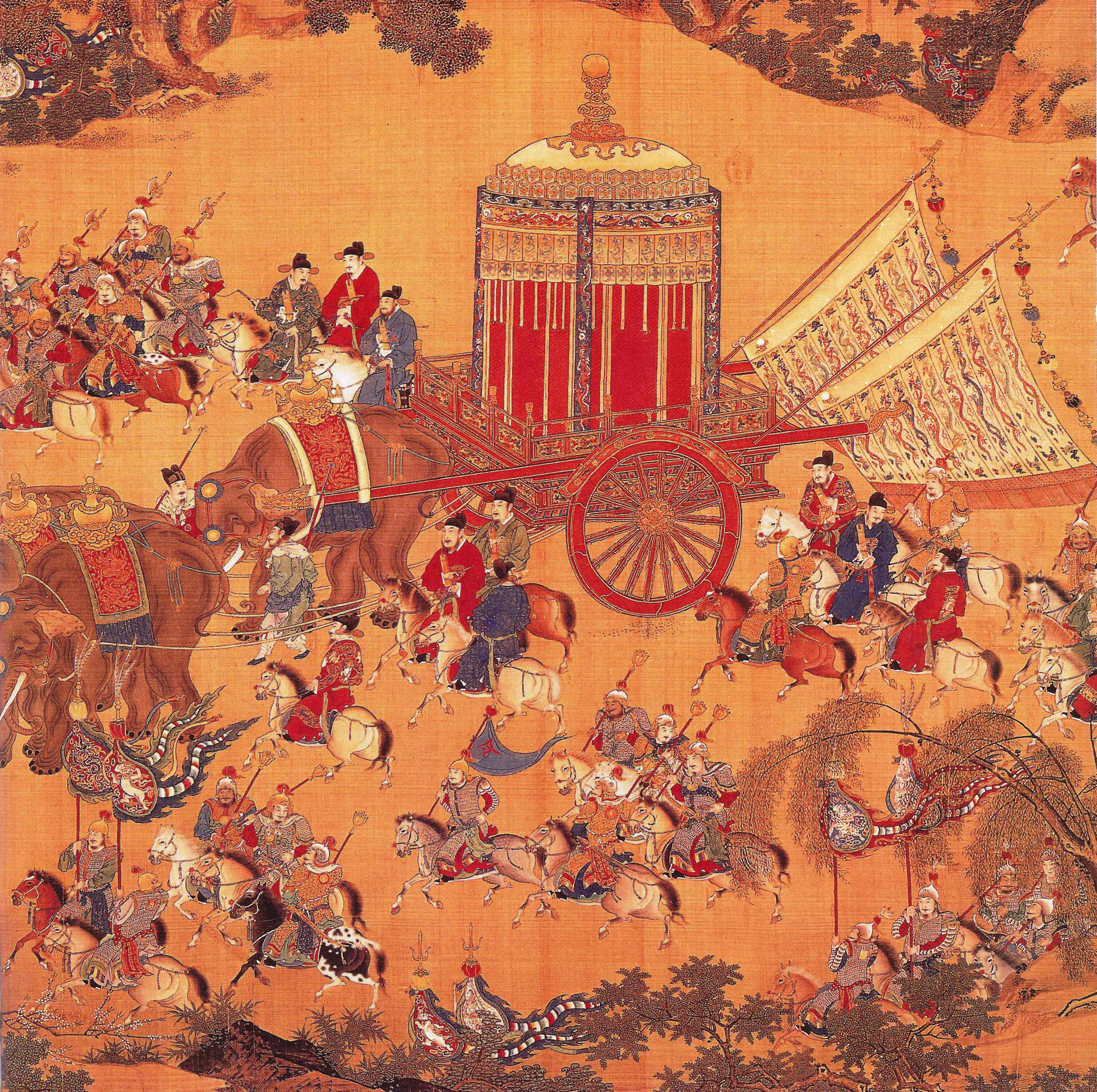
The Emperor's Carriage (1425–1435)

== Cochineal and Red Lake ==
Red lac, also called red lake, crimson lake or carmine lake, was an important red pigment in Renaissance and Baroque art. Since it was translucent, thin layers of red lac were built up or glazed over a more opaque, dark color to create a particularly deep and vivid color.

Unlike vermilion or red ochre, made from minerals, red lake pigments are made by mixing organic dyes, made from insects or plants, with white chalk or alum. Red lac was made from the gum lac, the dark red resinous substance secreted by various scale insects, particularly the Laccifer lacca from India. Carmine lake was made from the cochineal insect from Central and South America, Kermes lake came from a different scale insect, Kermes vermilio, which thrived on oak trees around the Mediterranean. Other red lakes were made from the rose madder plant and from the brazilwood tree.

Red lake pigments were an important part of the palette of 16th-century Venetian painters, particularly Titian, but they were used in all periods. Since the red lakes were made from organic dyes, they tended to be fugitive, becoming unstable and fading when exposed to sunlight.

Cochineal is a deep purplish-red color, made from insects, which is also used as a dye and to color food products. Cochineal was produced by the Incas to dye cotton from 700 BC. It was also used as a cosmetic and a pigment. The insects were raised on large plantations before the arrival of the Spanish. Three hundred kilos of insects could be raised on each hectare of the plantation. The Spanish conquerors appreciated the value of the color and arranged the export of hundreds of tons to Europe. The production of cochineal was also introduced in the Canary Islands and in Poland. It largely disappeared after the invention of synthetic dyes and pigments, but has resumed more recently because of the lack of toxicity and environmental benefits of the product.

A common characteristic of Red Lake pigments is their translucency. especially in oil painting. Painters often created more vivid colors by adding layers of red lakes over less transparent underfloors, particularly painting over lake colors mixed with lead white or vermilion. A weakness of lake pigments is their tendency to fade because of the action of light.

Lake pigments, unlike most other reds, are made from vegetal rather than mineral sources. Madder is produced made from a plant, Rubia tinctorum. They are the result precipitating a dye with an inert binder, or mordant, usually a metallic salt.

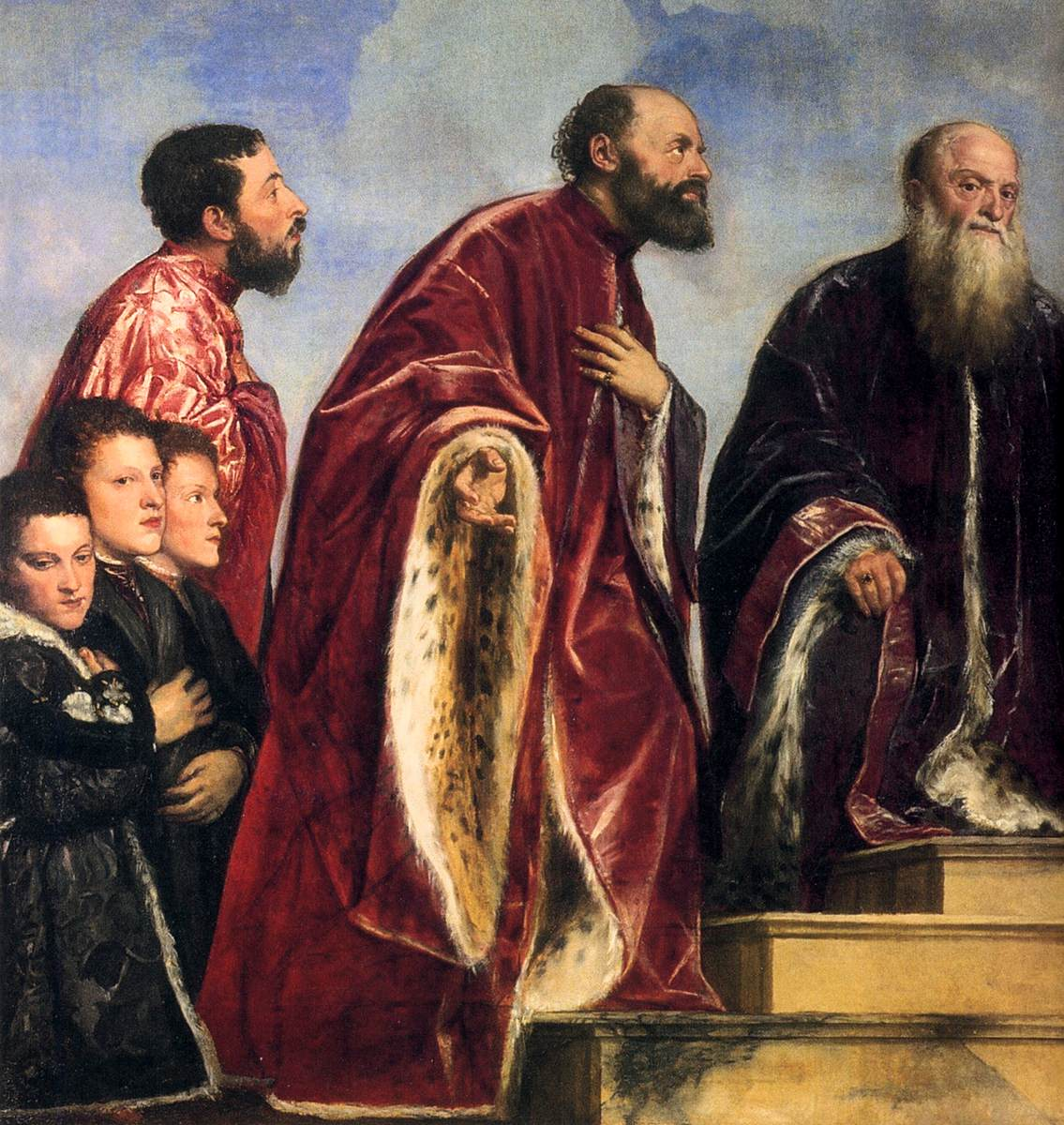
Titian used glazes of red lake to create the vivid crimson of the robes in The Vendramin Family Venerating a Relic of the True Cross, completed 1550–60 (detail).

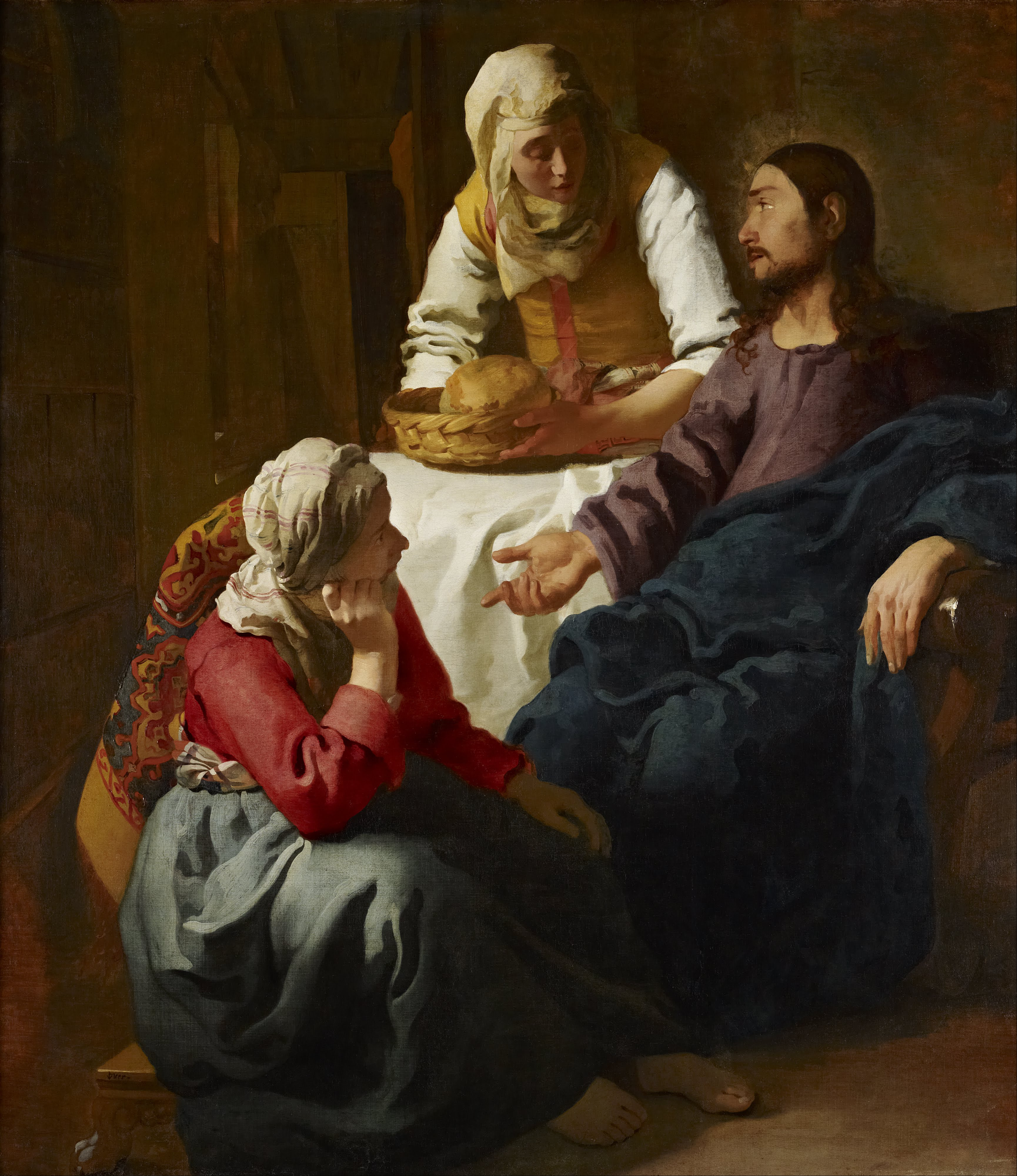
"Christ in the House of Martha and Mary" by Vermeer, used red lake pigments.(1654–1656)

== Minium ==
Minium is a bright orange-red pigment that was often used in the Middle Ages for Illuminated manuscripts. It was made by roasting white lead pigment.

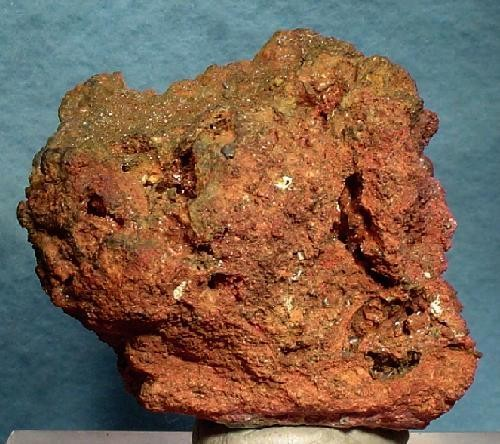
Solid minium

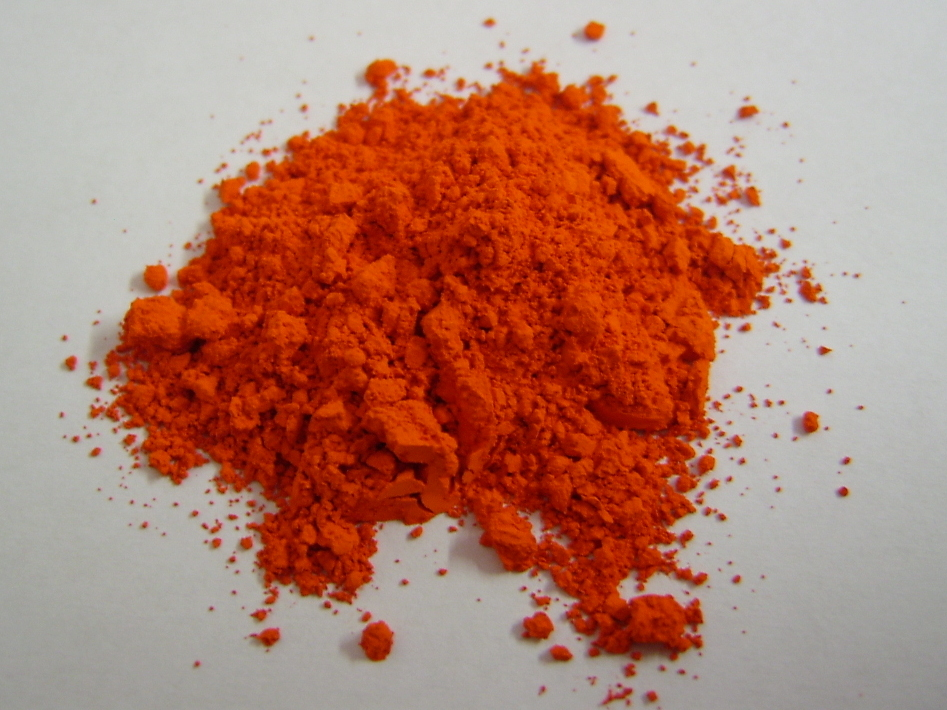
A sample of minium pigment, made by roasting white lead pigment

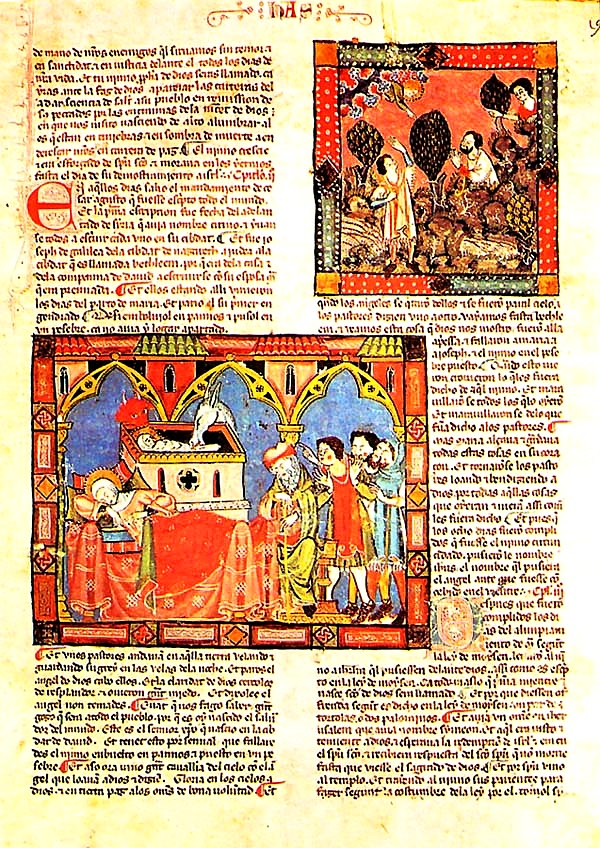
The Códice del Escorial (1272–1284) from Spain, used minium pigment for red letters and illustrations

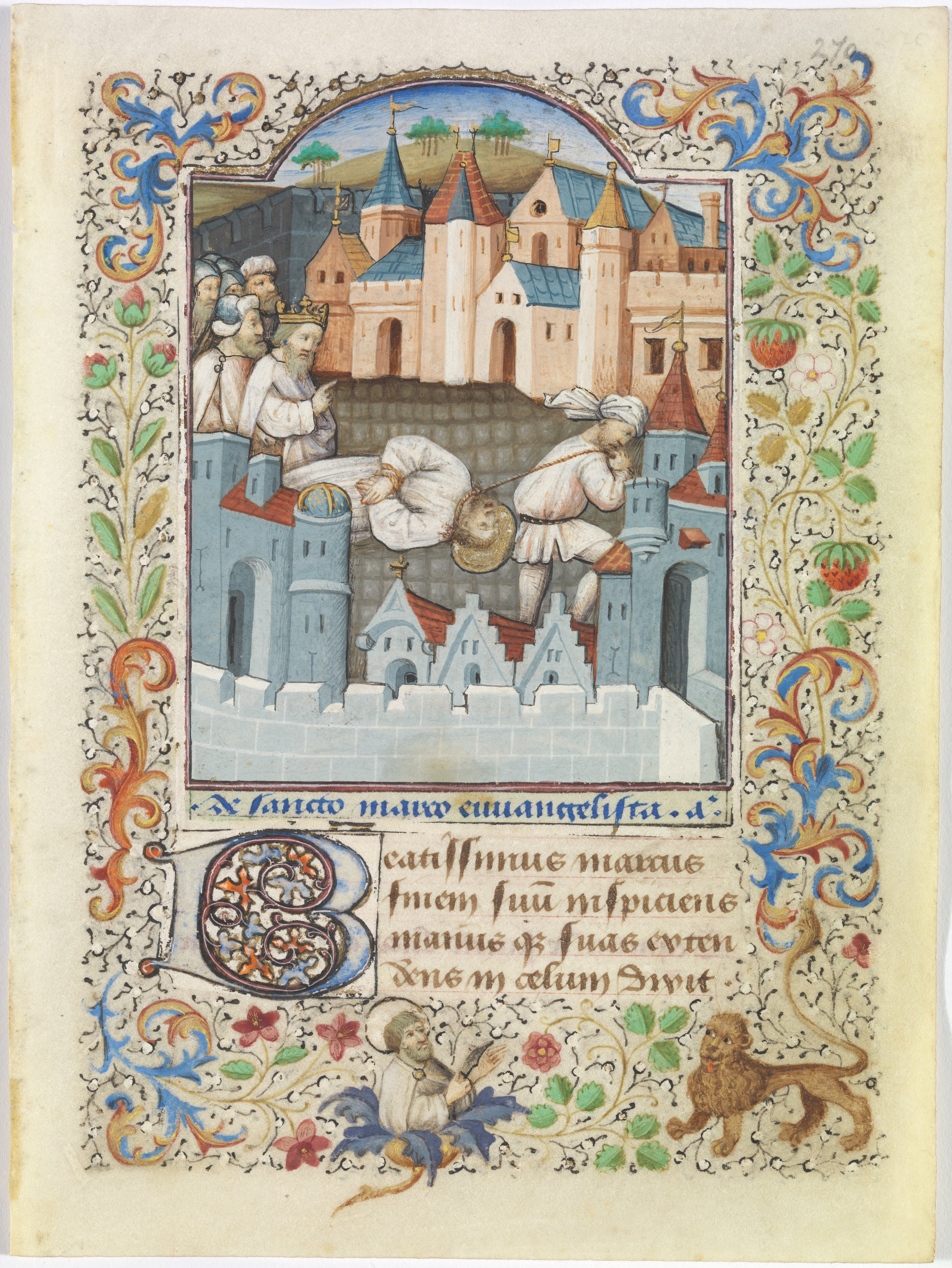
Martyrdom of St Mark the Evangelist. Paris, 1443-1445 (CBL W 082, f.270r)

== List of red inorganic pigments ==
This is a list of red inorganic pigments, both natural and synthetic:

Arsenic pigments

- Realgar: As_{4}S_{4}: a highly toxic natural pigment.

Cadmium pigments

- Cadmium red (PR108): cadmium sulfo-selenide (Cd_{2}SSe).

Cerium pigments

- Cerium sulfide red (PR265).

Iron oxide pigments

- Sanguine, Caput mortuum, Indian red, Venetian red, oxide red (PR102).
- Red ochre (PR102): anhydrous Fe_{2}O_{3}.
- Burnt sienna (PBr7): a pigment produced by heating raw sienna.

Lead pigments

- Minium (pigment): also known as red lead, lead tetroxide, Pb_{3}O_{4}.

Mercury pigments

- Vermilion or cinnabar (PR106): HgS.

== Bibliography ==
- Pastoureau, Michel (2016). Rouge: Histoire d'une couleur (in French). Paris: Éditions du Seuil. ISBN 978-2-7578-7820-0.
- Varichon, Anne (2005). Couleurs: pigments et teintures dans les mains des peuples (in French). Paris: Editions du Seuil. ISBN 978-2-02-084697-4.
- Bomford, David and Roy, Ashok, "A Closer Look - Colour", National Gallery, London (2009), ISBN 978-1-85709-442-8
- Chunling, Yan, "Chinese Red", Foreign Languages Press, Beijing (2008), ISBN 978-7-119-04531-3
