= Minium (pigment) =

Pigment

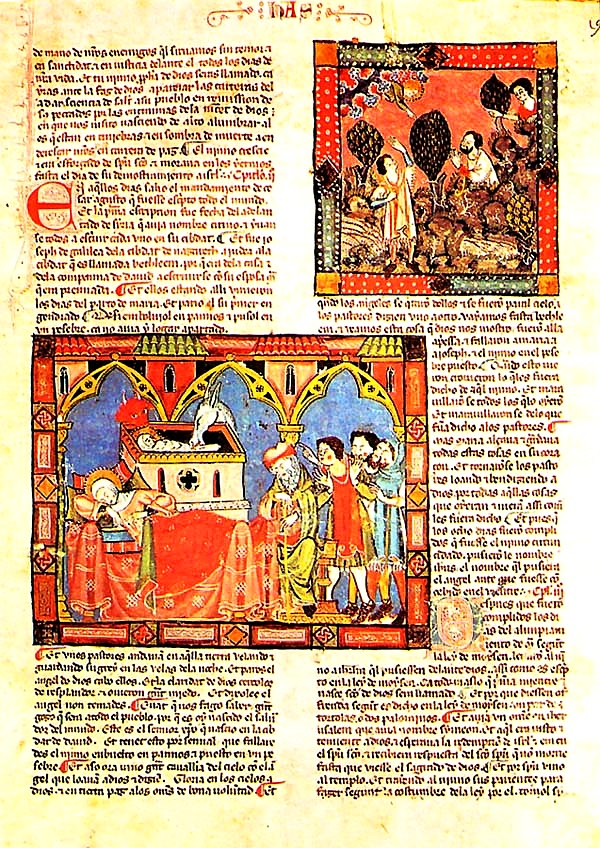
The Códice del Escorial (1272–1284) from Spain. Medieval manuscripts often used red-orange minium pigment in the letters of the text and for small illustrations, called miniatures.

Minium, also known as red lead or red lead oxide, is a bright orange red pigment that was widely used in the Middle Ages for the decoration of manuscripts and for painting. Often mistaken for less poisonous cinnabar and vermillion, minium was one of the earliest pigments artificially prepared and is still in use today. It was made by roasting white lead pigment in the air; the white lead would gradually turn yellow, then into an orange lead tetroxide. Minium's color varied depending upon how long the mineral was roasted.

== History ==
During the Roman Empire, the term minium could refer either to the pigment made from ground cinnabar or to the less expensive red lead. The name came from the river Minius in Iberia (now forming part of the Spanish-Portuguese border and known as Miño or Minho), located near the main Roman cinnabar mines. Pliny the Elder referred to it as flammeus, or flame color. The minium of red lead was easy to make and less expensive than the pigment made from the mineral cinnabar, and it was bright and cheerful, so it became the most commonly used bright red in Medieval painting despite being poisonous, and sometimes turning black in impure air. The use of red lead phased out with the introduction of vermilion from the 11th century.

There was (and is) considerable confusion among the names of ancient and medieval pigments. As noted above, the term minium was used for cinnabar, vermilion, and for red lead. Minium of red lead was sometimes called stupium in classical Latin, adding to the confusion.

Minium may have been manufactured in China as early as 300 B.C. It was known in the Han dynasty (200 BC – 200 AD) under the name "cinnabar of lead" (ch'ien tan), The process of manufacturing it was described in a Chinese manuscript of the 5th century. Minium was widely used for Persian miniature painting and Indian miniature painting. Minium also appeared in Egypt during the Greco-Roman period. The Romans used minium for writing the initial letters or titles in their books. It was also used for inscriptions because it was visible on gold and marble.

== Visual characteristics ==
Red lead provides good body and hiding power in oil due to its high density and fine texture. The pigment has a tendency to darken in watercolor and wall paintings, but is stable in oil mediums. The color of the pigment changes depending on the size of the particles and the presence of litharge.

Despite its name, red lead is usually more orange than red, strongly absorbing ultraviolet and visible light from 200 to 500 nm and reflecting in the infrared region.

== Permanence ==
One of red lead's most cited drawbacks, other than its poisonous nature, is its tendency to darken in some circumstances. As a result, it is unsuitable as a pigment on frescoes and in watercolor. Darkening results from the transformation of red lead to black lead oxide. The problem has been identified on several medieval manuscripts and Swiss wall paintings. Exposure to light and humidity are likely explanations for this darkening.

== Notable occurrences ==
=== Miniatures ===
Minium was frequently used in medieval manuscripts. The color was used in particular for the paragraph signs, versals, capitals, and headings. The Latin verb for this kind of work was miniare, to apply minium, and a person who did this was known as a miniator. These medieval artists also made small illustrations and decorative drawings in the manuscripts, which became known as miniatures, the source of the English word for small works of art.

=== Japanese paintings ===
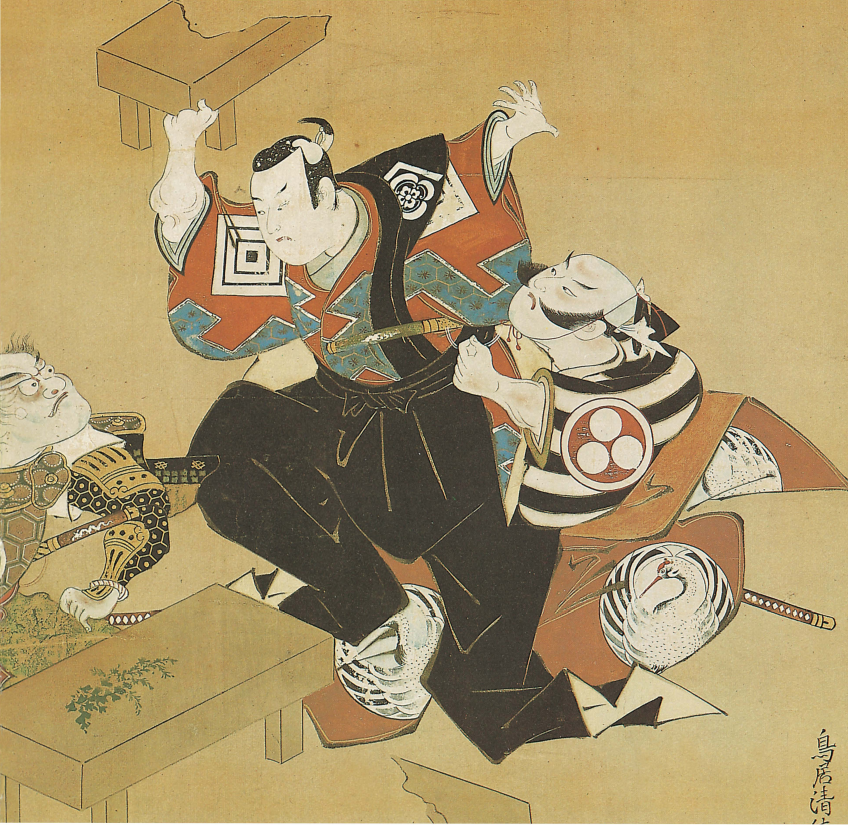
Three Actors Playing a Scene, Torii Kiyonobu I. The red-brown robe of actor, lower right, is darkened red lead.

Minium is common on Japanese paintings of the Ukiyo-e school in the seventeenth through nineteenth centuries. The orange color on these works has generally been well preserved because the paintings were mounted on scrolls and subsequently rolled up and protected (as seen in Three Actors Playing a Scene from the Freer Gallery of Art, Washington). Some areas of brown red lead, however, are present in the work.

=== Cosmetics ===
Minium was used as a cosmetic in ancient Greece, Rome, China, and beyond, with Pliny the Elder writing "minium is in great esteem in Ethiopia, their nobles being in the habit of staining the body all over with it." A pale, smooth complexion was much desired in ancient Rome, likely as an indicator of social status. Rouge was the next most visible element, with minium being used as a cheap, bright, and easy to make ingredient for female cosmetics to create a blush.

=== Other uses ===
Minium is commonly used in Russia, where it is called surik, as well as in Norway, India and China. Oil based red lead paints are used to protect ships, railroad cars and all sorts of steel constructions from corrosion. Minium bonds with iron creating a protective oxide layer that resists corrosion even in salt water.

== Gallery ==
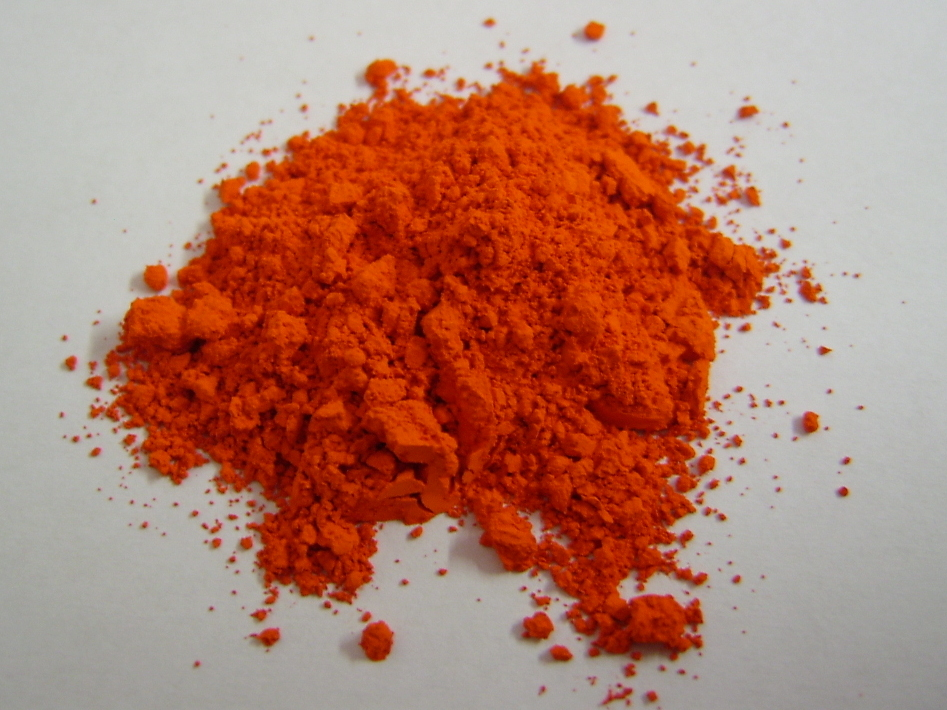
A sample of minium pigment, made by roasting white lead pigment

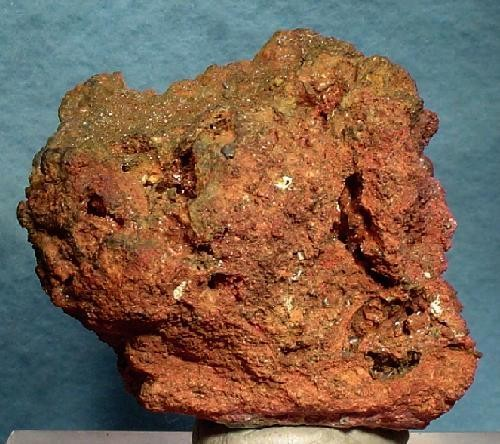
Solid minium

Red lead #FF4203
#FF4203

== See also ==
- List of inorganic pigments
- Red pigments
