= Stiblite =

Secondary minerals of antimony oxide class

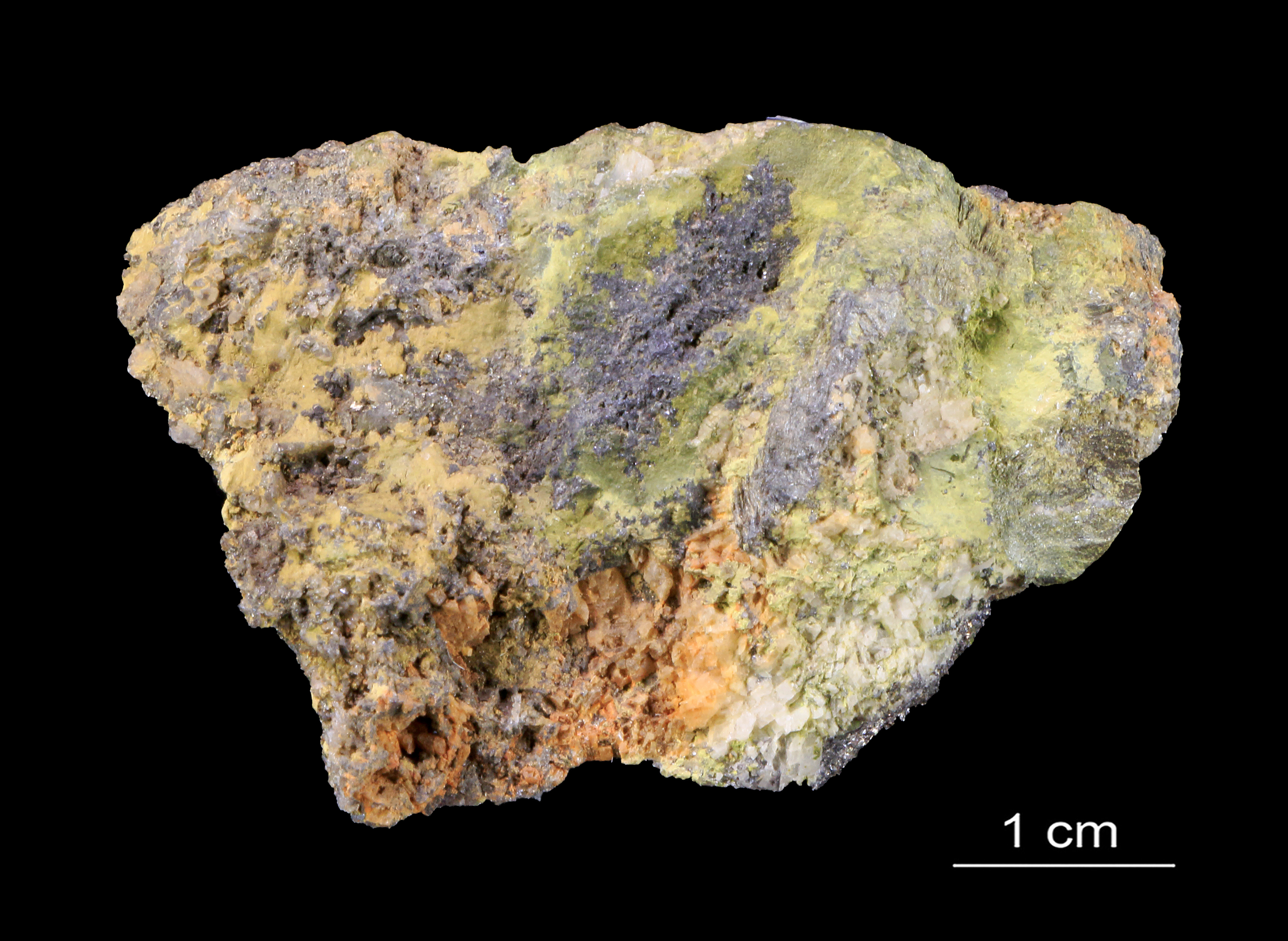
- Stiblite and antimony ochre coating

General
- Category: Minerals

Stiblite, stibilite, stibiolite (German: Stiblith from Latin: Stibium + Ancient Greek: λίθος, stone), also stibiconise or antimony ochre (Spiessglanzocker, Stibiconise) — an obsolete, formerly widely used mineralogical name for one of the best known and most widespread antimony ochres. Established in 1847 (by Johann Blum and Delfs) a decade and a half after stibiconite, stiblite was known in the 19th century as a secondary antimony mineral of the ″hydrous oxide″ class, it was an amorphous, pale yellowish precipitate found in association with blaenierite (bindheimite) and jamesonite, and was particularly found at Trevinnick Mine, near Endellion, Cornwall. It is now considered a synonym of stibiconite.

Other known stiblit deposits in the mid-19th century included Losacio area (Spain), Felsobany and Kremnitz (Hungary), Goldkronach (Bavaria), and the Carmen mines (Zacualpan, Mexico). Large stiblit deposits were also discovered in Peru (Cajamarca).

In a more general form, the term stiblit was often used broadly in relation to antimony ochres in general, or only to those forms that contain molecular water (hydroxide ochres). This happened starting in the second half of the 19th century, primarily because the term ″antimony ochre″ in mineralogy began to rapidly become obsolete and required an adequate replacement. As a result, the broad term ″stiblit″ was used in conditions of a lack of analytical data on the exact composition of the oxides (secondary minerals) covering stibnite and other antimony ores.

In addition, under the same name stiblit, which resembles a play on words, you can sometimes find another mineral from the zeolite family, which has nothing to do with antimony — sodium stilbite, a hydrous aluminosilicate with a variable chemical composition, having the calculated formula NaCa_{4}(Si_{27}Al_{9})O_{72}•28H_{2}O.

== Stiblite gallery ==
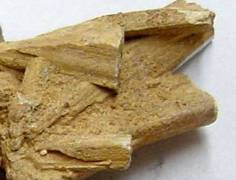
Stibiconite

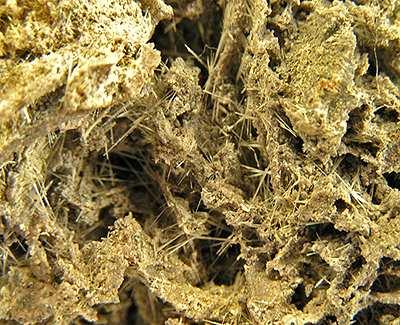
Antimony ochre

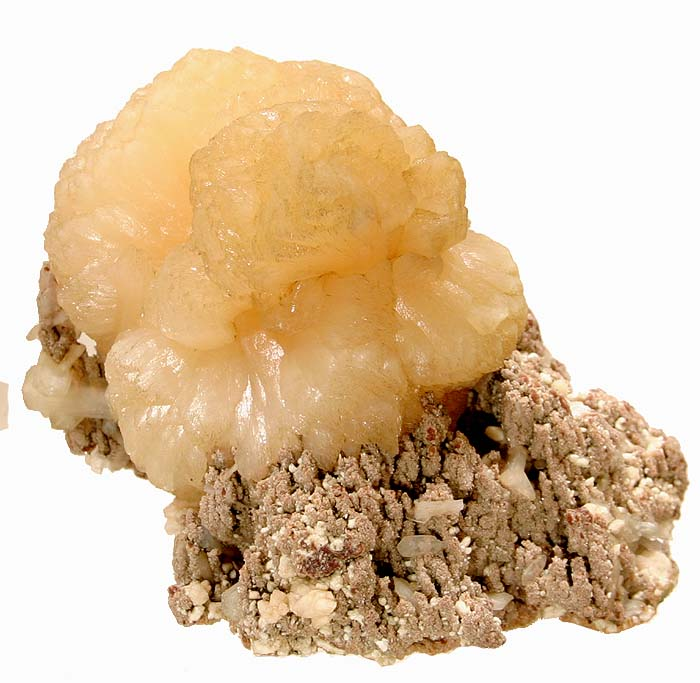
Stilbite

== See also ==
- Antimony ochre
- Romeite
- Valentinite
- Senarmontite
- Cervantite
