= Antimony ochre =

Secondary minerals of antimony oxide class

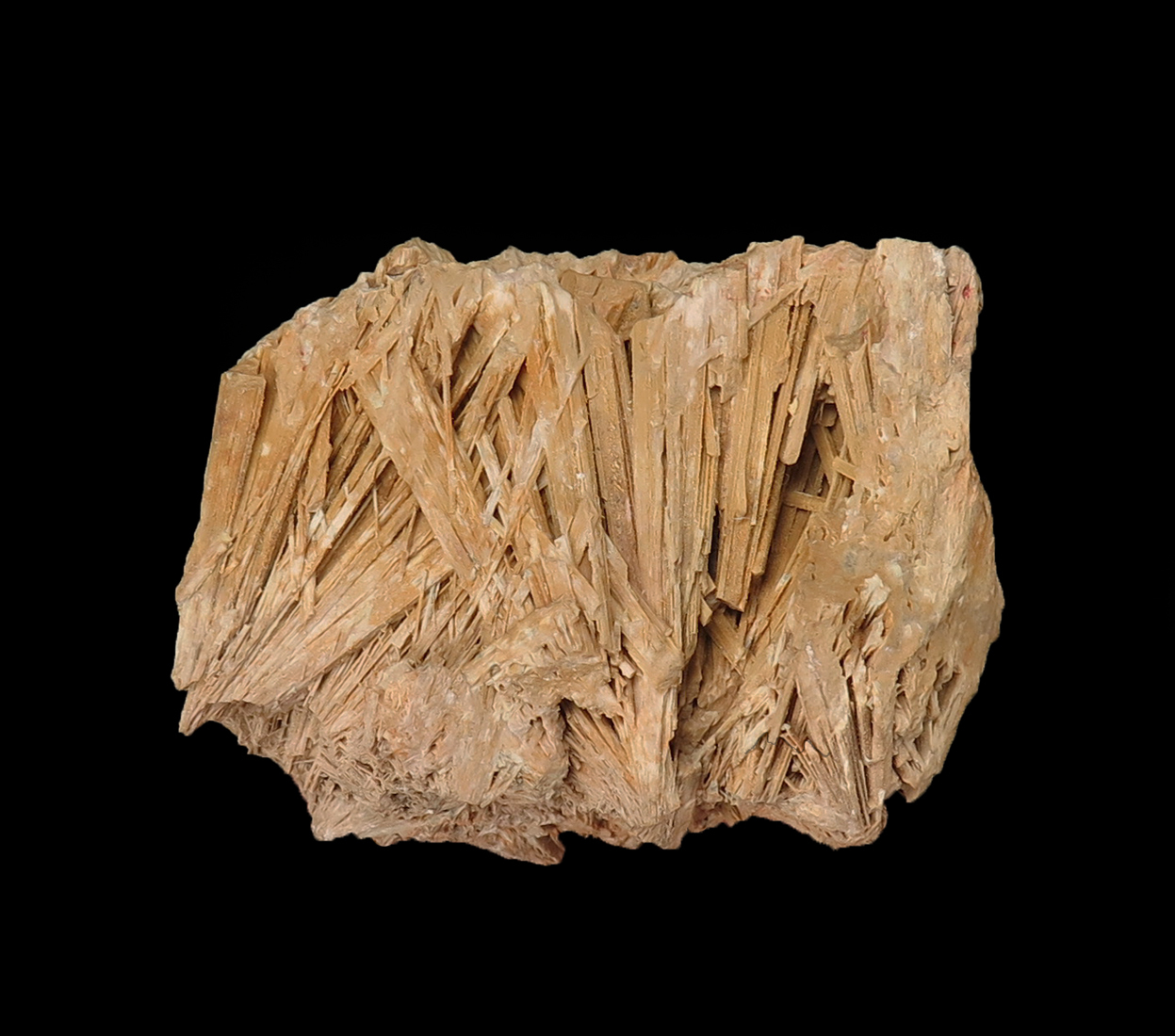
- Cervantite (Guerrero, Mexico)

General
- Category: Minerals

Antimony ochre (Antimony ocher in American English) or ochre of antimony (German: antimonocker, French: antimon ochre) — a partially obsolete trivial name for secondary antimony minerals of the oxide class. Antimony ochres most often have the appearance of a powdery brown-yellow to whitish product of weathering (oxidation) of antimonite or native antimony. Usually they are not a pure mineral (one of the ochres), but a mixture of two or more minerals: cervantite, valentinite, romeite, senarmontite, stibiconite, sometimes with an admixture of limonite or quartz.

In the mineralogical sense of the word, antimony ochres are a loosely defined group of secondary antimony minerals of the oxide and hydroxide class. The most common antimony ochres are cervantite, romeite, and stibiconite, but their number is by no means exhaustive. At various times, this conditional list also included other names, some of which are now recognized as incorrect or non-existent.

Antimony ochres are associated ore minerals, often more difficult to obtain antimony than the main antimonite, in addition, they are found in nature in small quantities, as an impurity or coating, which is why they are rarely used separately. They received their name by analogy, for their external resemblance to light ochres.

== Essential minerals ==
- Cervantite (German: Cervantit) or white lustrous antimony ore — antimony tetroxide with the ideal formula Sb_{2}O_{4} or, in more detailed form, Sb^{3+}Sb^{5+}O_{4}, an oxidation product of antimonite, along with valentinite — the lightest of the antimony ochers.
- Stibiconite (German: Stibiconit) or kumengite — a mineral of the oxide class of variable composition with the conventional formula (Sb^{3+},Ca)_{2−x}Sb_{2}^{5+}(O,OH)_{6-7}•nH_{2}O. The name stibiconite is very characteristic of all antimony ochres; from the Latin Stibium — antimony and the Greek χονίς (konis) — dust, powder.
- Stiblite, partially obsolete (German: Spiessglanzocker, French: Stibiconise) — a mineral of the oxide class, widely known in the 19th century, which appeared as amorphous yellowish secretions, found in association with bleinierite (bindheimite) and jamesonite, was found at the Trevinnick mine, near Endellion, Cornwall. It is currently considered a synonym of stibiconite.
- Romeite (German: Romeit) — a mineral of the oxide class from the stibiconite group with the theoretical formula (Ca,Na,Fe,Mn)_{2}Sb_{2}^{5+}O_{6}(O,OH,F). It is known in five varieties: atopite, schneebergite, mauzeliite, weslienite, hydroxycalcioroméite (lewisite).
- Valentinite (German: Valentinit) — one of the simplest oxidic antimony ochres, representing antimony oxide with the calculated formula Sb_{2}O_{3}. In antimony ochres it is usually found in a mixture with other antimony oxides.
- Senarmontite (German: Senarmontit) — a mineral of the same chemical composition as valentinite, less common, differing in syngony and forming rather large octahedral crystals, colorless, transparent, white or gray.
- Volgerite (obsolete) — a mineral form of antimony acid, identified in the mid-19th century by the German geologist Otto Volger as antimony ochre in the Algerian mines of Constantine Province. It is white or off-white in color., is now recognized as one of the varieties of stibiconite.

== Antimony ochres gallery ==
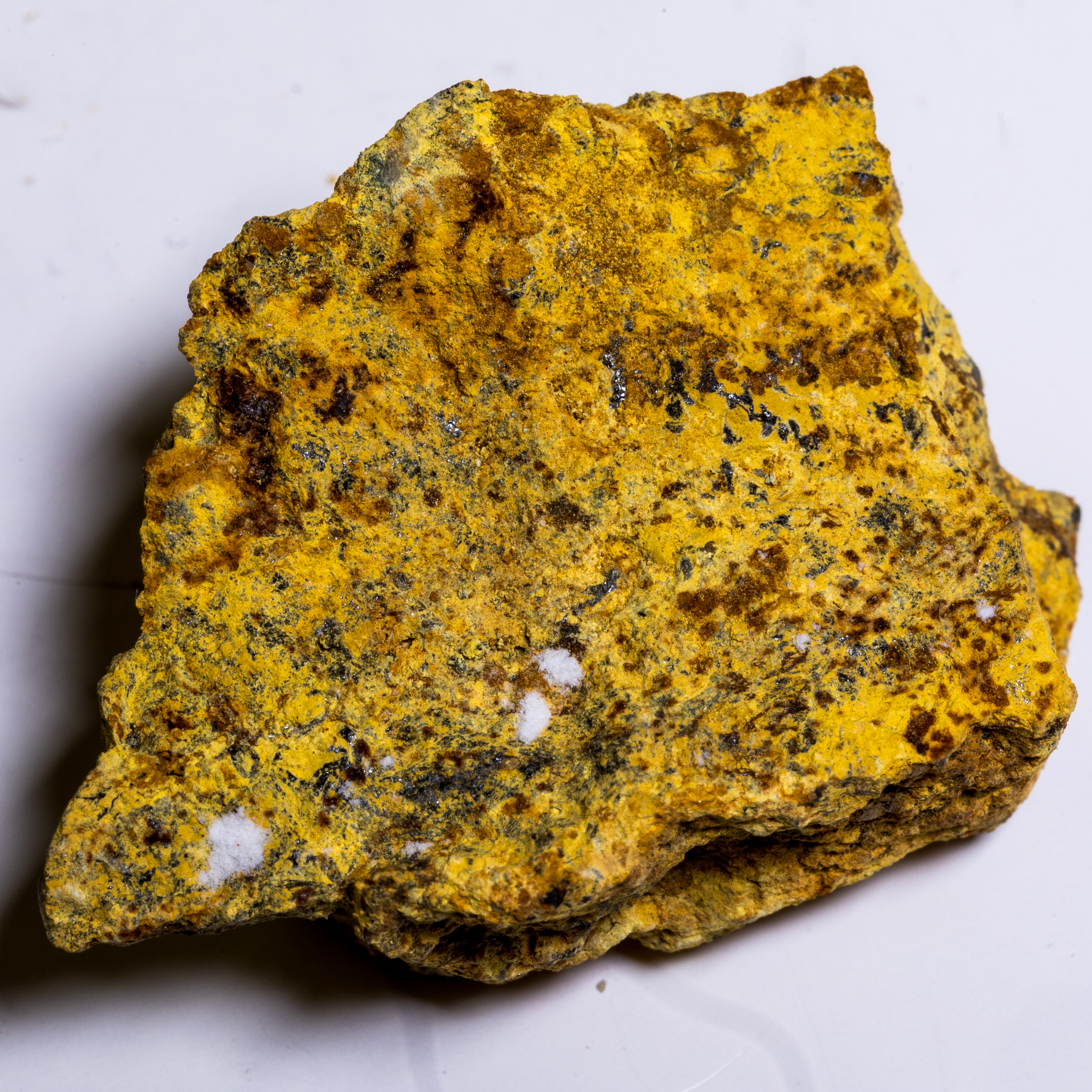
Cervantite

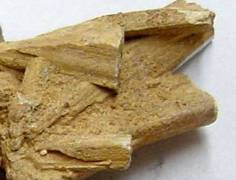
Stibiconite

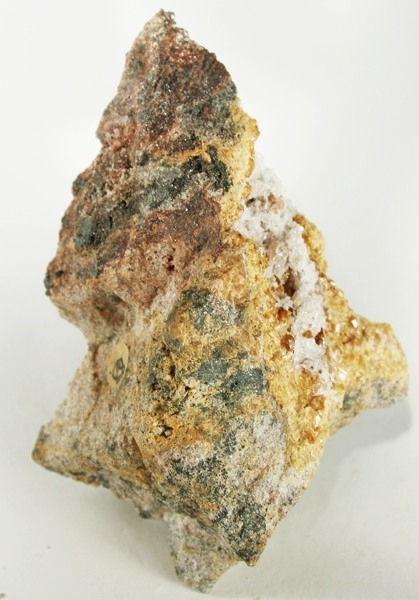
Romeite

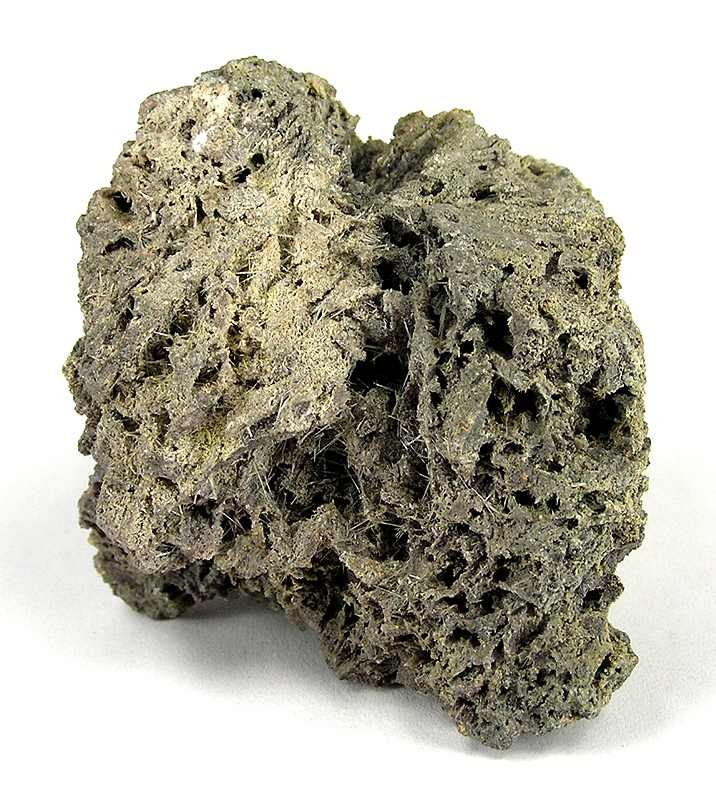
Valentinite

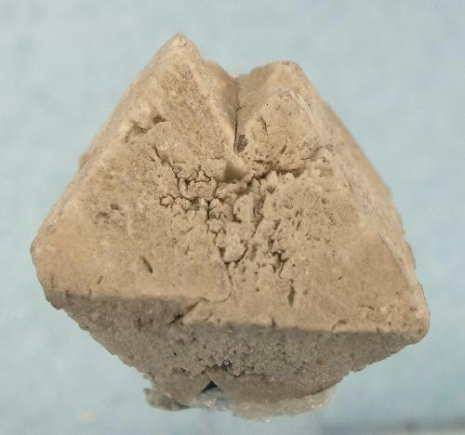
Senarmontite

== See also ==
- Stiblite
- Attic ochre
- Cobalt ochre
- Golden ochre
- Iron ochre
- Lead ochre
