= Geerite =

Copper sulfide mineral

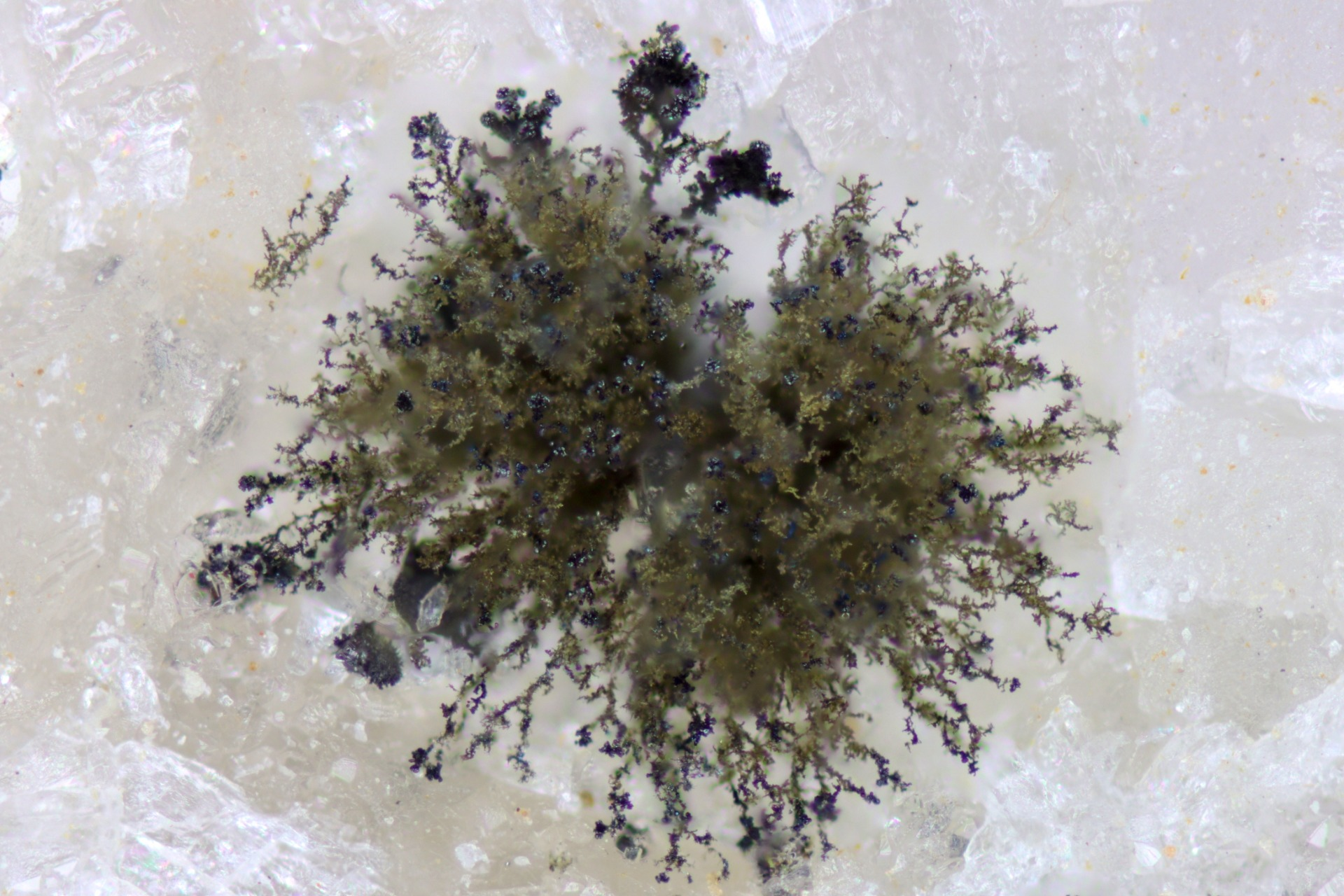

General
- Category: Sulfide mineral
- Formula: Cu_{8}S_{5}
- IMA symbol: Gee
- Strunz classification: 2.BA.05c
- Crystal system: Trigonal
- Crystal class: 32, 3m, 3̅m
- Unit cell: a = 3.83 Å, c = 46.84 Å; Z = 1

Identification
- Formula mass: 668.70 g/mol
- Color: Bluish white in reflected light
- Crystal habit: Platy – sheet forms (e.g. micas); pseudocubic
- Mohs scale hardness: 3.5-4
- Luster: Metallic
- Diaphaneity: Opaque
- Specific gravity: 5.61
- Pleochroism: Weak

Geerite is a copper sulfide mineral with the chemical formula Cu_{8}S_{5}. The mineral is named after the original collector, Adam Geer, of Utica, New York, US.

== Crystallography ==
Geerite is in the crystal class 3̅. This means that the crystal could be inverted and then rotated by 120 degrees to return to its original position. The optical class of geerite is unknown. Geerite is anisotropic which means that it will show interference colors when it is rotated in cross polarized light and that the mineral has different properties in different directions.

== Discovery and occurrence ==
It was first described in 1980 for an occurrence as thin coatings or platelets replacing sphalerite in the type locality in De Kalb Township, Saint Lawrence County, New York. It also occurs in a magnetite–chromite a serpentinite-hosted deposit in Eretria, Greece. It occurs associated with spionkopite, sphalerite, tetrahedrite, chalcopyrite, malachite, azurite, brochantite, chrysocolla, cervantite, stibiconite, hemimorphite and calcite in the type locality; and with spionkopite, chalcopyrite, cobaltian pentlandite, magnetite, chromite, andradite, chlorite, diopside in the Eretria deposit. It has also been reported from a variety of locations worldwide, including the Logatchev-1 hydrothermal field along the Mid-Atlantic Ridge complex.

It has been used to study crystal structure and bonding in copper sulfides.

== See also ==
- Copper sulfide
