= Lucky Knock Mine =

Mine in Okanogan County, Washington, United States

Coordinates: 48.7704°N 119.4865°W

The Lucky Knock Mine is a mine located in Okanogan County near Ellisford, Washington. The Lucky Knock Mine is located in the Northern Rocky Mountains, which is a physical geographic province within the Rocky Mountain System. Sometimes the mine can be called the Lawrence Mine. The current owner is E. A. Magill.

Antimony is the primary ore produced at the site, with stibnite being the chief source of this metal. Other minerals found here include sphalerite, along with gangue minerals such as calcite and quartz. The site also contains zinc and limestone.

== History ==
=== 1900s ===
William Ingram discovered the Lucky Knock Mine in 1904. Around 1907, approximately 40 tons of material, assayed at 62% antimony (Sb), were shipped. The initial development of the Lucky Knock Mine involved the creation of an open pit known as "Pit D," which was developed during 1907-1908.

=== 1910s ===
After 1908, the Lucky Knock Mine remained idle until 1915. During the period from 1915 to 1917, significant underground work was carried out at the site, which included driving two adits and constructing a plant to convert stibnite into antimony oxide for bathtub enamel production. Additionally, some high-grade stibnite was shipped during this time. By 1918, the property had been closed down. Between 1910 and 1920, a 321-foot well was drilled to supply water for the plant, although no stibnite was encountered during the drilling.

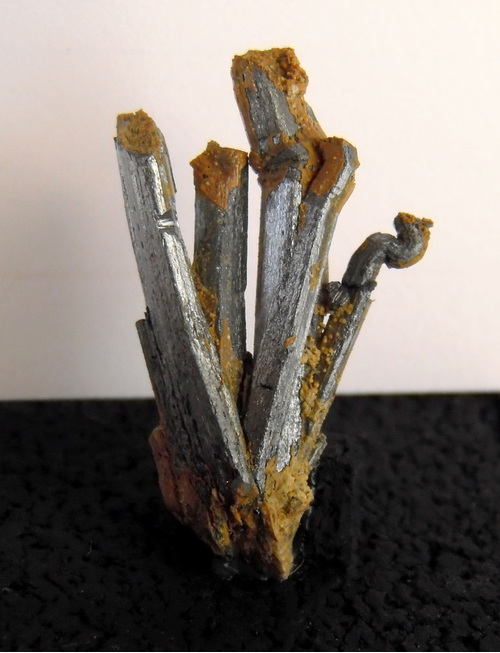
Stibnite from the Lucky Knock Mine

=== 1920s ===
In 1920, six claims encompassing the property were patented, despite all the workings and the mineralized area being confined to a single claim known as the Lucky Knock. After 1921, the workings collapsed.

=== 1940s ===
In 1941, 42 tons of hand-sorted ore, with a grade of 30.47% antimony (Sb), were shipped to Harshaw Chemical Co. in Los Angeles. That same year, Whitestone Mines, Inc. acquired the property and secured a quitclaim deed. In 1948, seven shipments were made, totaling 47 tons of hand-sorted material that averaged 55.9% antimony (Sb). In that same year, E. A. Magill acquired a lease and cleaned up the workings.

=== 1960s ===
In 1967, limited production was carried out by Lucky Knock.
