= Antimony oxide =

Antimony oxide may refer to any of the following:

- Antimony trioxide, Sb_{2}O_{3}
- Antimony tetroxide, Sb_{2}O_{4}
- Antimony pentoxide, Sb_{2}O_{5}
- Stibiconite, Sb_{3}O_{6}(OH)
