= Xikuangshan Mine =

Mine in Lengshuijiang, Hunan, China

Coordinates: 27.752°N 111.483°E

Xikuangshan mine (simplified Chinese: 锡矿山; traditional Chinese: 錫礦山; pinyin: Xīkuàngshān) in Lengshuijiang, Hunan, China, contains the world's largest known deposit of antimony (Sb). It is unique in that there is a large deposit of stibnite (Sb_{2}S_{3}) in a layer of Devonian limestone. There are three mineral beds which are between 2.5 and 8 m thick which are folded in an anticline that plunges to the south-west. The total mineralised area of the mine has a surface extent of 14 km^{2}. There are two different units at the mine, the northern one produces mixed oxide and sulfide such as stibiconite (Sb_{3}O_{6}(OH)) and the southern one produces stibnite. Ore is concentrated and refined on site in a refinery with a capacity of 10,000 tonnes of antimony per year.

== History ==
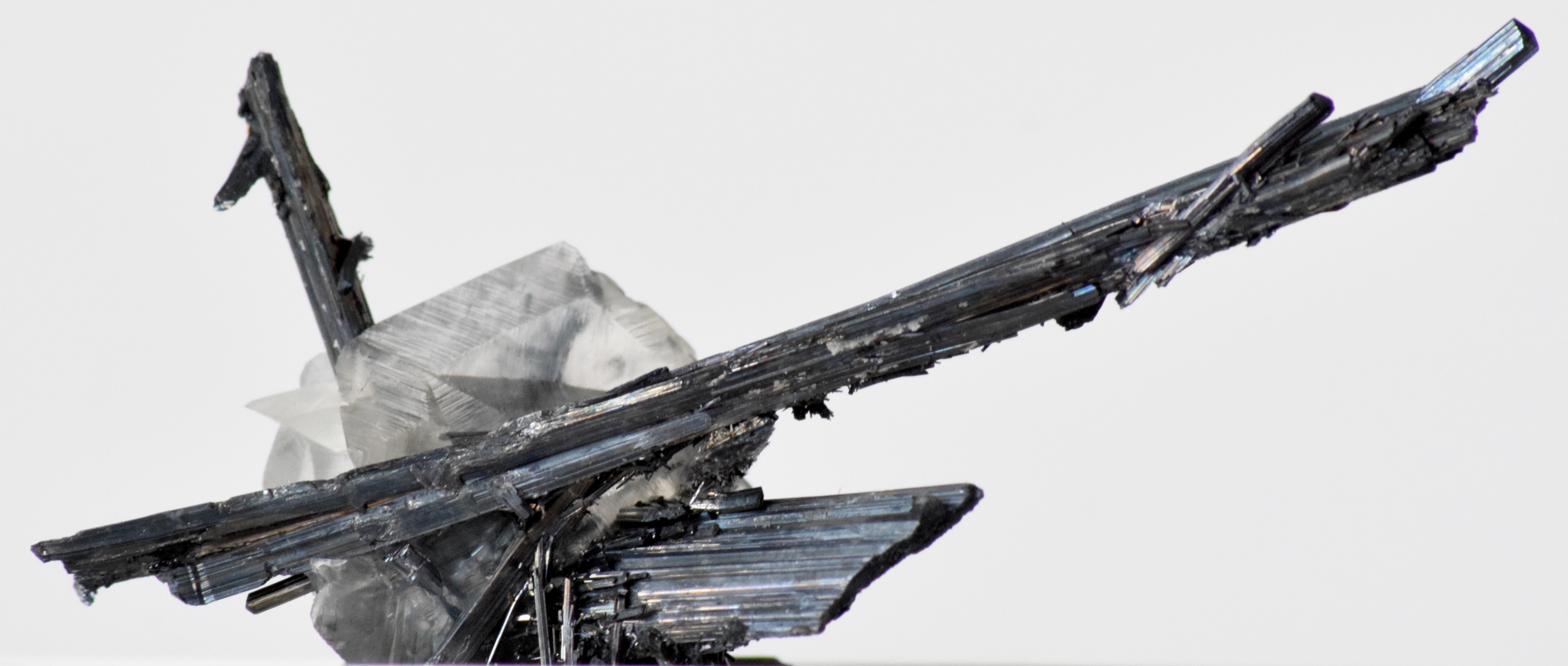
Antimonite crystals (longest crystal: 7 cm) intergrown with calcite (length: 3 cm) from Xikuangshan Mine

A tin mine is thought to have been opened on the site in 1521. The mine's approximate average annual antimony production from 1892 to 1929 was 12,500 tonnes; from 1949 to 1981, it was 5,500 tonnes; in 1981, it was 15,500 tonnes.

== Reserves ==
In 1981, reserves at the Xikuangshan deposit amounted to 10,000,000 tonnes of ore that contained 2 to 3 percent antimony (200-300,000 tonnes of antimony), at the time geologists thought that there may be more in the area. By 2002 the estimated size of the deposit was 2,110,000 tonnes of pure antimony. The ore is composed of quartz, calcite, stibnite and some pyrite.

== Formation ==
Using samarium–neodymium dating, it has been estimated that the deposit formed during the late Jurassic – early Cretaceous period (around 145 million years ago).

== Water pollution ==
In April 2010 it was reported that antimony levels in water near the mine were as high as 11 parts per million, a thousand times those found in uncontaminated water. The antimony was found to be in the V oxidation state, believed to be the least dangerous aqueous form (antimony can have a I, III or V oxidation state). The environmental effects of this high level of the rare metalloid are poorly understood and are currently under investigation by a team from the Chinese Academy of Sciences, Indiana University Bloomington and the University of Alberta.
