= Native antimony =

Mineral (as opposed to the chemical element)

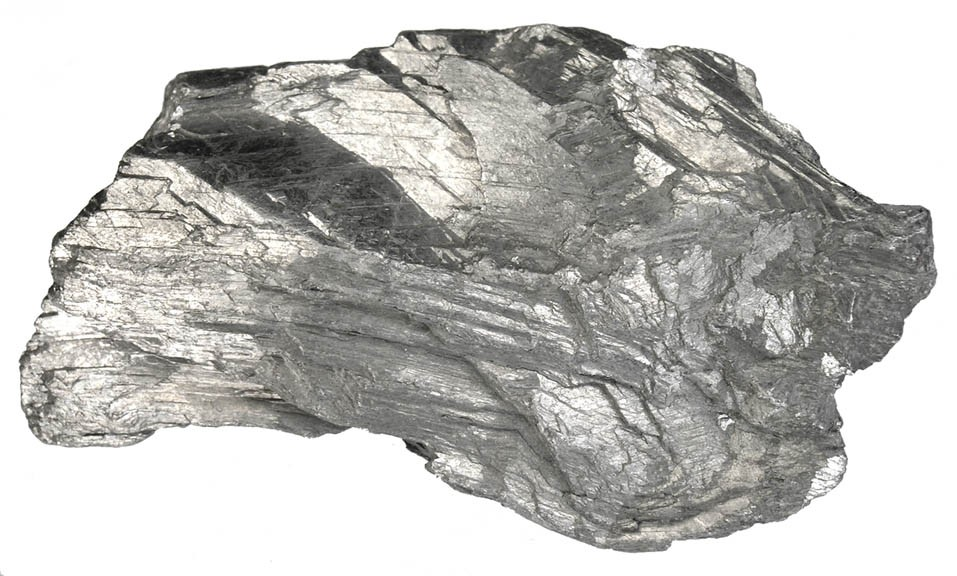
- Native antimony. Matilde mine, La Viñuela, Málaga, Spain

General
- Category: Native elements
- Formula: Sb
- IMA symbol: Sb
- Strunz classification: 1.CA.05
- Dana classification: 1.3.14.4
- Crystal system: Trigonal
- Crystal class: Hexagonal Scalenohedral

Identification
- Color: Tin-white
- Crystal habit: Crystalline masses
- Twinning: According to {0114}
- Cleavage: Perfect according to {0001}
- Fracture: Irregular
- Tenacity: Brittle
- Mohs scale hardness: 3-3.5
- Luster: Metallic
- Streak: Grey
- Diaphaneity: Opaque
- Specific gravity: 6.61-6.71
- Optical properties: Anisotropic

Native antimony is a mineral belonging to the group of native elements, with properties equivalent to those of the antimony element obtained by processing its ores. The name comes from the Latin antimonium. For centuries, the term antimony was also used to refer to stibnite or antimonite, the most common mineral containing this element, from which it was typically extracted. In mineralogy, the official name is simply antimony, although, as with other native elements, it is often referred to as native antimony to avoid ambiguity. It is unclear where native antimony was first discovered, although the Sala silver mine in Västmanland, Sweden, is considered the type locality.

== Properties ==
The fundamental component is antimony itself, and it is usually very pure, although it may contain traces of other elements, especially arsenic, bismuth, iron, or silver. It is part of the native arsenic group, which also includes arsenolamprite (a polymorph of native arsenic), native bismuth, and the compounds stibarsen, pararasenolamprite, and paradocrasite. It has the same physical and chemical properties as the artificial product, but the natural mineral, when coarsely crystalline, is characterized by its perfect cleavage.

== Occurrence ==
On a microscopic scale, native antimony is quite widespread in sulfide mineralizations containing this element. On a macroscopic scale, it is much rarer. Pseudocubic crystals have been found in the Consols mine in Broken Hill, New South Wales (Australia), and the Lake George mine in York County, New Brunswick (Canada). In the Sala silver mine, in Västmanland, Sweden, it is found as coarsely crystalline masses within calcite. In the Matilde mine in La Viñuela, Málaga (Spain), coarsely crystalline masses with large cleavage planes are also found, forming an important part of the exploited ore, which is exceptional. In Arechuybo, Chihuahua (Mexico), it appears in a granular form. It is associated with stibnite, kermesite, valentinite, and senarmontite.
