= Antimony(III) oxide hydroxide nitrate =

Identifiers
CAS Number	20328-96-5
3D model (JSmol)	Interactive image
- InChI: InChI=1S/2NO3.2H2O.4O.4Sb.24H/c2*2-1(3)4;;;;;;;;;;;;;;;;;;;;;;;;;;;;;;;;;;/h;;2*1H2;;;;;;;;;;;;;;;;;;;;;;;;;;;;;;;;/q2*-1;;;4*-2;4*+3;;;;;;;;;;;;;;;;;;;;;;;;/p-2 Key: QDIXRPSLWJOEKT-UHFFFAOYSA-L
- SMILES: [Sb+3].[Sb+3].[Sb+3].[Sb+3].[O-2].[O-2].[O-2].[O-2].[OH-].[OH-].O=[N+]([O-])[O-].O=[N+]([O-])[O-]

Properties
Chemical formula	Sb_{4}O_{4}(OH)_{2}(NO_{3})_{2}
Molar mass	709.058 g·mol^{−1}
Appearance	colorless solid
Density	4.45 g/cm^{3}

Structure
Crystal structure	Monoclinic
Space group	P2_{1}/c [14]
Point group	2/m
Lattice constant	a = 11.020(2) Å, b = 5.355(5) Å, c = 10.270(1) Å α = 90°, β = 123.71°, γ = 90°
Lattice volume (V)	521.2 Å^{3}
Formula units (Z)	2
Coordination geometry	distorted trigonal bipyramidal at SbO_{4}; tetrahedral at SbO_{3}; planar at NO^{−}_{3}
- Except where otherwise noted, data are given for materials in their standard state (at 25 °C [77 °F], 100 kPa). Infobox references

Antimony(III) oxide hydroxide nitrate is an inorganic compound with the chemical formula Sb_{4}O_{4}(OH)_{2}(NO_{3})_{2}. According to X-ray crystallography, its structure consists of cationic layers of antimony oxide/hydroxide with intercalated nitrate anions.

== Synthesis ==
Large crystals may be obtained by a prolonged reaction of antimony(III) oxide (Sb_{2}O_{3}) with 6M nitric acid (HNO_{3}), starting at a temperature of 110 °C (230 °F) and gradually lowering the temperature by 5 to 10 °C (41 to 50 °F) per day until room temperature is reached.
