= Antimony orthophosphate =

Chemical compound

Names
- IUPAC name Antimony(3+) phosphate
- Other names Antimony phosphate; Antimonous phosphate

Identifiers
CAS Number	12036-46-3
3D model (JSmol)	Interactive image
ChemSpider	10612701
PubChem CID	21867851
CompTox Dashboard (EPA)	DTXSID10619107
- InChI: InChI=1S/H3O4P.Sb/c1-5(2,3)4;/h(H3,1,2,3,4);/q;+3/p-3 Key: KIQKNTIOWITBBA-UHFFFAOYSA-K
- SMILES: [O-]P(=O)([O-])[O-].[Sb+3]

Properties
Chemical formula	O_{4}PSb
Molar mass	216.730 g·mol^{−1}
Melting point	877 °C (1,611 °F; 1,150 K)
- Except where otherwise noted, data are given for materials in their standard state (at 25 °C [77 °F], 100 kPa). Infobox references

Antimony phosphate, (also called antimony orthophosphate, or antimonous phosphate) is a chemical compound of antimony and phosphate with formula SbPO_{4}. Antimony is in the form Sb(III) with +3 oxidation state. Antimony atoms have a lone pair of electrons.

== Layered form ==
SbPO_{4} occurs as a layered compound. Two-dimensional layers are weakly held together by electrostatic forces. SbPO_{4} is one of the most compressible materials, and under pressure compresses more perpendicular to the layers. At standard conditions SbPO_{4} crystallises in a monoclinic form with space group P2_{1}/m. Antimony phosphate has been investigated for use in lithium ion and sodium ion batteries.

Antimony atoms are attached to four oxygen atoms. These atoms are arranged as a squarish pyramid with antimony at the apex. Antimony atoms form the top and bottom of the layers. Four oxygen atoms are arranged tetrahedrally around phosphorus. Antimony to oxygen bond lengths are 1.98 2.04 2.18 and 2.93 Å. the O-Sb-O angles are 87.9 164.8 84.1 and 85.0°. The structure of SbPO_{4} differs from two forms of BiPO_{4}, where bismuth associates with five or eight phosphate groups.

In SbPO_{4} the ^{31}P chemical shift is −18 ppm. The binding energy of the 2p electrons of phosphorus atom as determined by XPS is 133.9 eV.

When the pressure exceeds 3 GPa, bonds form between the layers, but it retains the monoclinic system. But when the pressure is between 9 and 20 GPa, it transitions to a triclinic form with space group P1̅. 10.1021/acs.inorgchem.9b02268

The infrared spectrum shows absorption bands at 1145, 1052, and 973, 664, 590, 500, 475, and 372 cm^{−1}. These are due to vibrations in P-O and Sb-O bonds and also bending in O-P-O bonds.

== Antimony(V) phosphate ==
Antimony(V) phosphate SbOPO_{4} has monoclinic crystals. It has space group C2c. The unit cell has dimensions a = 6.791 Å, b = 8.033 Å, c = 7.046 Å, and β = 115.90°, with number of formula per unit cell of Z = 4. It is formed by heating Sb_{2}O_{5}·xH_{2}O and (NH_{4})H_{2}PO_{4}. At 1218 K it loses oxygen to become antimony(III) phosphate.

== Formation ==
SbPO_{4} may be formed by soaking antimonous oxide in pure phosphoric acid and then filtering the solid, and heating to 600 °C.

Sb_{2}O_{3} + 2H_{3}PO_{4} → 2SbPO_{4} + 3H_{2}O

A related method involves heating a water solution of phosphoric acid with antimonous oxide at about 120 °C.

Yet another procedure involves heating diammonium phosphate with antimonous oxide at 600 °C.

== Reactions ==
SbPO_{4} reacts with bases such as ammonia, hydrazine and ethylenediamine to form Sb_{2}O_{3} and hydrogenphosphate salts.

However intercalation is also claimed with amines. Intercalation of amines expands the a axis of the crystals, but leaves c, and c dimensions unaltered. The β angle is reduced. This is due to a bilayer of molecules inserting between each layer in the original crystal.

There are also double salts where phosphate groups are joined to antimony.

== List ==
formula	mw	crystal system	space group	unit cell Å	volume	density	comment	references
SbPO_{4}		monoclinic	P2_{1}/m	a=5.088 b=6.762 c=4.724 β=94.64°		4.45		
Sb_{5}PO_{10}		orthorhombic	P2_{1}2_{1}2_{1}	a=6.8373 b=7.0932 c=19.873 Z=8	963.8		layered, SbPO_{4} and Sb_{4}O_{6}	
α-Sb^{III}Sb^{V}(P_{2}O_{7})_{2}		monoclinic	P2_{1}/c	a = 8.088 b = 16.015 c = 8.135 β = 90.17° Z = 4	1053.8	3.73	colourless	
β-Sb^{III}Sb^{V}(P_{2}O_{7})_{2}		orthorhombic	Pna2_{1}	a = 8.018 b = 16.134 c = 8.029 Z = 4	1038.6	3.78	colourless	
Sb^{III}Sb^{V}_{3}(PO_{4})_{6}		trigonal	R3̅	a = 16.880 c = 21.196 Z=12	5230			
[H_{3}N(CH_{2})_{2}NH_{3}]_{0.5}SbF(PO_{4})		monoclinic	P2_{1}/c	a=6.5417 b=14.9877 c=9.2193 β=134.7698°				
(NH_{4})_{2}Sb_{4}O_{2}(H_{2}O)(PO_{4})_{2}[PO_{3}(OH)]_{2}	955.00	triclinic	P1̅	a=7.2569 b=7.3904 c=18.905 α=85.297° β=81.574° γ=70.609° Z=2	945.5	3.354	band gap 5.30 eV; birefringence 0.045@1064 nm	
[H_{3}N(CH_{2})_{2}NH_{3}]_{1.5}[(SbO)_{2}(SbF)_{2}(PO_{4})_{3}]	935.09	monoclinic	P2_{1}/c	a=14.822 b=13.766, c=9.3022 β =105.341° Z=2	1830.4	3.393		
(H_{3}O)Sb_{2}(SO_{4})_{2}(PO_{4})		triclinic	P1̅	a=5.134 b=7.908Å c=12.855 α=81.401° β=87.253° γ=86.49°				
NaSb_{3}O_{2}(PO_{4})_{2}		orthorhombic	Pca2_{1}	a=13.944 b=6.682 c=20.886	1946.1			
K_{2}Sb(P_{2}O_{7})F	392.89	tetragonal	P4bm	a=8.5239 c=5.572 Z=2	404.86	3.223	SHG 4.0×KH2PO4; birefringence 0.157@546 nm	
K_{4}(SbO_{2})_{5}(PO_{4})_{3}	1210.06	monoclinic	P2_{1}/c	a=11.1084 b=14.9138 c=12.7957 β=112.907° Z=4	1952.7	4.116		
KSb_{2}(SO_{4})_{2}(PO_{4})		triclinic	P1̅	a=5.1453 b=7.9149 c=12.6146 α=82.054° β=87.715° γ=86.655°				
RbSb_{2}(SO_{4})_{2}(PO_{4})		triclinic	P1̅	a=5.1531 b=7.957 c=12.845 α=81.801° β=87.676° γ=86.703°				
Rb(SbO_{2})_{2}PO_{4}	487.94	monoclinic	C2/c	a=12.4487 b=7.1018 c=15.0153 β=96.561° Z=8	1320.5	4.909		
Rb_{3}(SbO_{2})_{3}(PO_{4})_{2}	907.60	trigonal	R3̅m	a=7.1423 c=31.826 Z=3	1406.0	3.216		
Cd_{3}Sb_{2}(PO_{4})_{4}(H_{2}O)_{2}	996.61	monoclinic	P2_{1}/c	a=9.829 b=9.3437 c=8.6265 β=111.41° Z=2	737.6	4.487	colourless	
Cs_{2}Sb_{3}O(PO_{4})_{3}	931.98	triclinic	P1̅	a=7.2896 b=9.6583 c=11.5880 α=98.748° β=104.706° γ=109.279° Z=2	719.58	4.301	UV edge 213 nm; band gap 5.02 eV; birefringence 0.034@1064	
Cs_{3}(SbO_{2})_{3}(PO_{4})_{2}(H_{2}O)_{1.32}	1093.49	trigonal	R3̅m	a=7.1486 c=32.7496 Z=3	1449.37	3.758		
Ba_{3}Sb_{2}(PO_{4})_{4}	1035.4	monoclinic	C2/c	a=20.383 b=8.5292 c=8.9072 β=108.247° Z=4	1470.6	4.676	colourless	
