= Kermesite =

Mineral

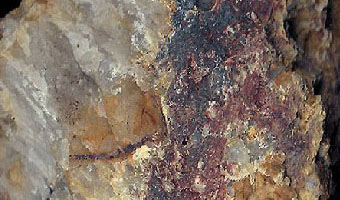

General
- Category: Oxysulfide
- Formula: (Sb_{2}S_{2}O)
- IMA symbol: Kem
- Strunz classification: 2.FD.05
- Dana classification: 02.13.01.01
- Crystal system: Triclinic
- Crystal class: Pinacoidal (1̅) (same H-M symbol)
- Space group: P1̅

Identification
- Color: Red to cherry red, purple
- Crystal habit: Acicular, fibrous, radial
- Cleavage: Perfect {100}, parting on {010}
- Fracture: Brittle
- Tenacity: Sectile
- Mohs scale hardness: 1–2
- Luster: Adamantine to semimetallic
- Streak: Brownish red
- Diaphaneity: Translucent, Opaque
- Specific gravity: 4.5–4.8+
- Optical properties: Biaxial (+)
- Refractive index: nα = 2.720 nβ = 2.740 nγ = 2.740
- Pleochroism: None

Kermesite (also known as antimony oxysulfide, red antimony, or purpur blende) is a mineral with the chemical formula Sb_{2}S_{2}O. Its color can range from cherry red to a dark red to a black. Kermesite is the result of partial oxidation between stibnite (Sb_{2}S_{3}) and other antimony oxides such as valentinite (Sb_{2}O_{3}) or stibiconite (Sb_{3}O_{6}(OH)). Under certain conditions with oxygenated fluids the transformation of all sulfur to oxygen would occur but kermesite occurs when that transformation is halted.

== Mining and specimens ==
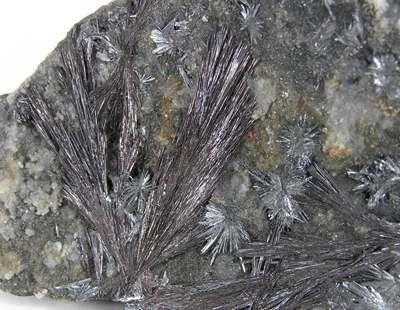
Lustrous, acicular, deep wine-red kermesite crystals, up to 4 cm long, on massive sulfide matrix, from Pezinok, Malé Karpaty Mts, Bratislava Region, Slovakia

Deposits of this mineral have been found all over the world, however notable deposits have been found in Braunsdorf, near Freiberg, Saxony, Germany; Pernek, Pezinok, and Pribram, Czechoslovakia; the Lac Nicolet mine, South Ham Township, Wolfe County, Quebec, Canada; Sombrerete, Zacatecas, Mexico; Santa Cruz and San Francisco mines, Poopo, Oruro, Bolivia; Que Que, Zimbabwe; Djebel Haminate, Algeria; Broken Hill, New South Wales, Australia; Mohave, Kern County, California and Burke, Shoshone County, Idaho.

== History and uses ==
Kermesite is named after a formerly used red dye, kermes (dye), and was so named because of the grainy reddish color the mineral often has. The name dates from 1832. Earlier in English (17th and 18th centuries) certain antimony compounds were called "kermes mineral" for the same reason.

Kermesite or red antimony has been used as early as the Old Kingdom’s 6th Dynasty in ancient Egypt (c. 2345–2181 BCE) in lip cosmetics and in the 18th Dynasty Queen Hatshepsut (Maatkare) (1498–1483 BCE) negotiated with the Land of Punt for its colored antimony deposits. Besides stibnite, which was used for eye liner red, antimony is one of the oldest minerals used in cosmetics. Further archaeological evidence indicates that antimony levels were higher in ancient Egyptian female remains which had exposure to both antimony compounds (Bencze, 1994). Because of its color, the precipitate of kermesite was used as a coloring agent and in alchemy. Because of alchemy’s focus on material transformation as evidenced by color, red antimony was used to produce the red state. Kermesite is the mineral state for Kermes mineral which was used extensively in the medical field for centuries

Presently, kermesite is collected for the beauty of its crystal metallic structure and not used in either cosmetics or the medical field any longer due to the toxic effects that it shares with antimony; less harmful substitutes have been found using both organic and pharmaceutical production.
