= Kermes mineral =

Kermes mineral or Alkermes mineral was a compound of antimony oxides and sulfides, more specifically, antimony trioxide and trisulfide. It can be made or obtained in the laboratory by the actions of potassium carbonate (K_{2}CO_{3}) on antimony sulfide. The compound is reddish brown in color and described as a velvety powder which is insoluble in water. It was used extensively in the medical field until the general use of antimony compounds declined due to toxic effects.

== History and Uses ==
The name is derived from the word kermes as denoting the compound's red color. The origins of the term is from the French kermès, which is short for alkermès, from the Arabic al-qirmiz a reference to crimson dye made from the bodies of insects (see Kermes (dye)). It was also known as poudre des Chartreux from a story of how it saved the life of a Carthusian monk in 1714. Because of its reputation as a medication and heal-all (or panacea), the formula and production process for Kermes mineral was purchased by the French government in 1720. Used for centuries in medicine as a health treatment, diaphoretic (causing sweat), anti-inflammatory and emetic it was used through the 19th century and its use extended to epilepsy treatment in addition to hectic fever.

== See also ==
- Kermesite
