= Ellisforde, Washington =

Unincorporated community in Washington, US

Ellisforde
- Unincorporated community
- Location within Washington (state)
- Coordinates: 48°47′24″N 119°24′04″W
- Country: United States
- State: Washington
- County: Okanogan
- Named after: George Ellis, James Forde
- Elevation: 909 ft (277 m)
- Time zone: UTC-8 (Pacific (PST))
  - Summer (DST): UTC-7 (PDT)
- GNIS feature ID: 1534579

Ellisforde, sometimes misspelled Ellisford, is an unincorporated small rural village in Okanogan County, Washington. Ellisforde is located along U.S. Route 97 to the east of the Okanogan River. There is an organic fertilizer plant at Ellisforde. The Lucky Knock Mine is located near the village.

== History ==
The name Ellisforde originates from George H. Ellis and James E. Forde, pioneer merchants and ranchers.
