= Antimony tetroxide =

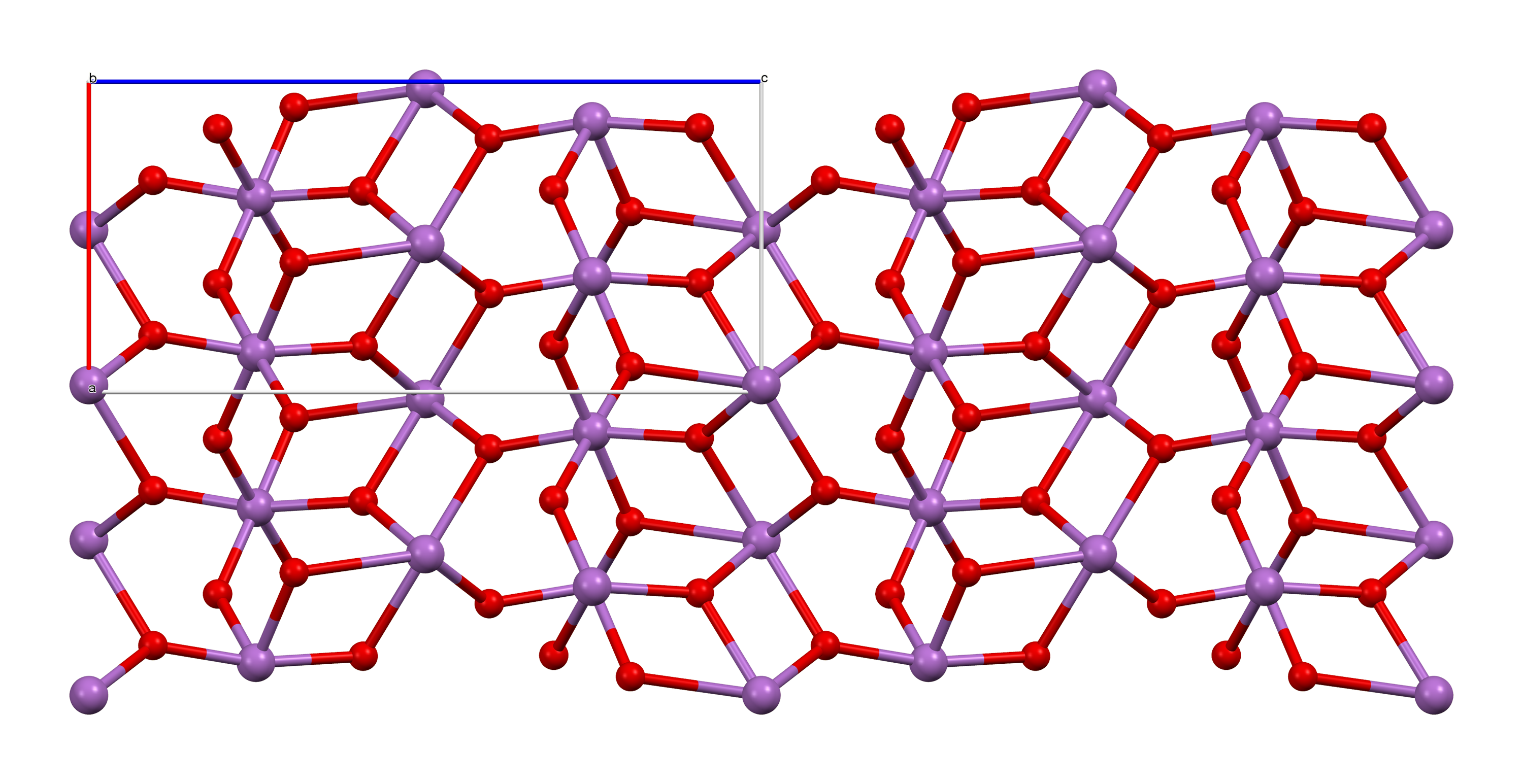
- α-Sb_{2}O_{4}

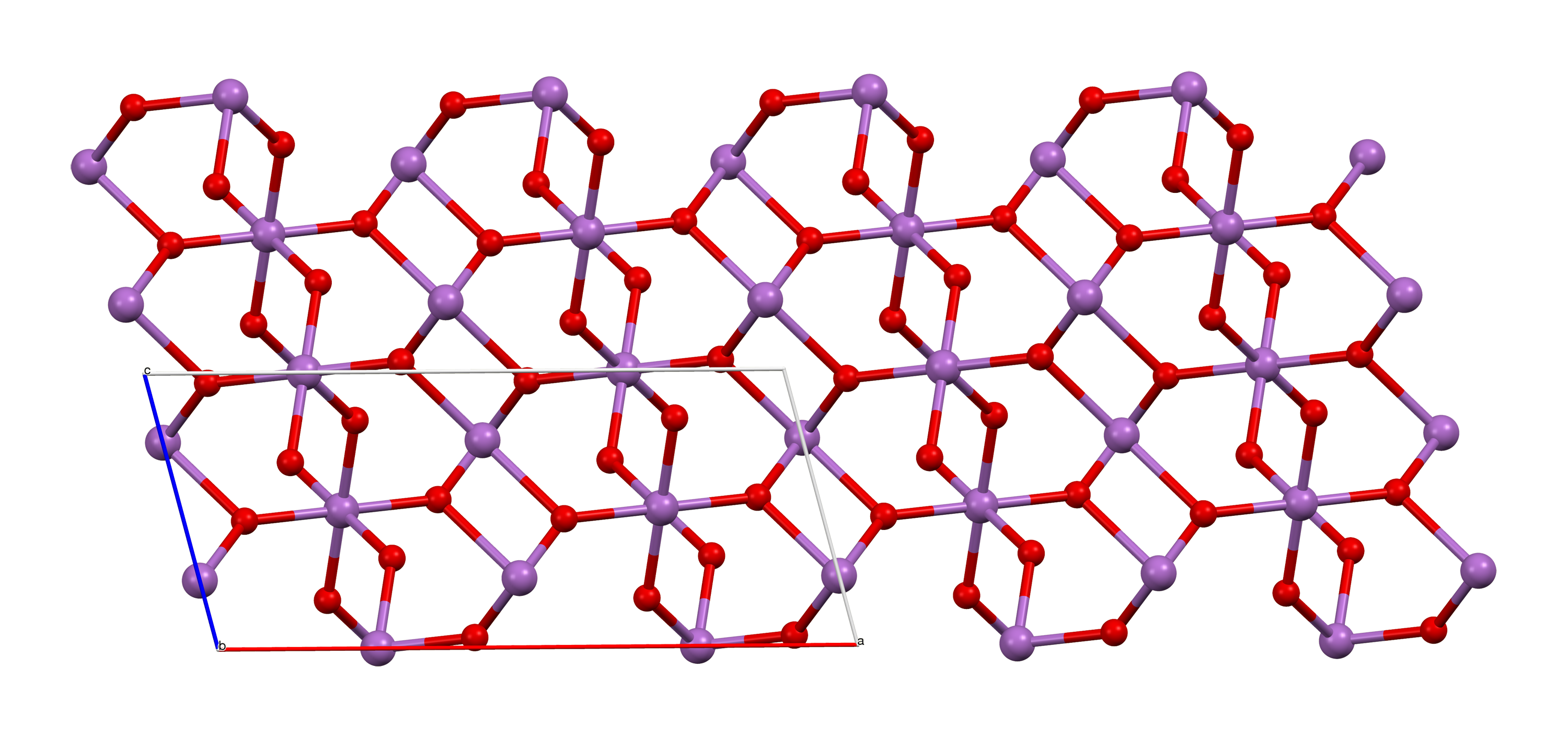
- β-Sb_{2}O_{4} Sb O

Names
- IUPAC name antimony(III,V) oxide

Identifiers
CAS Number	1332-81-6
3D model (JSmol)	Interactive image
ChemSpider	66628
ECHA InfoCard	100.014.161
EC Number	215-576-0
PubChem CID	74002
UNII	XB7RVZ5DN5
CompTox Dashboard (EPA)	DTXSID9061677
- InChI: InChI=1S/4O.2Sb Key: AHBGXHAWSHTPOM-UHFFFAOYSA-N
- SMILES: O=[Sb]O[Sb](=O)=O

Properties
Chemical formula	SbO_{2}; Sb_{2}O_{4}
Molar mass	153.7588; 307.5176 g/mol
Appearance	white solid
Density	6.64 g/cm^{3} (orthorhombic form)
Melting point	> 930 °C (1,710 °F; 1,200 K) (decomposes)
Boiling point	decomposes
Solubility in water	insoluble
Refractive index (n_{D})	2.0

Structure
Crystal structure	orthorhombic

Hazards
NFPA 704 (fire diamond)	2 1 0
- NIOSH (US health exposure limits)
PEL (Permissible)	TWA 0.5 mg/m^{3} (as Sb)
REL (Recommended)	TWA 0.5 mg/m^{3} (as Sb)

Related compounds
Related compounds	Antimony trioxide Antimony pentoxide
- Except where otherwise noted, data are given for materials in their standard state (at 25 °C [77 °F], 100 kPa). verify (what is ?) Infobox references

Antimony tetroxide is an inorganic compound with the formula Sb_{2}O_{4}. This material, which exists as the mineral cervantite, is white but reversibly yellows upon heating. The material, with empirical formula SbO_{2}, is called antimony tetroxide to signify the presence of two kinds of Sb centers.

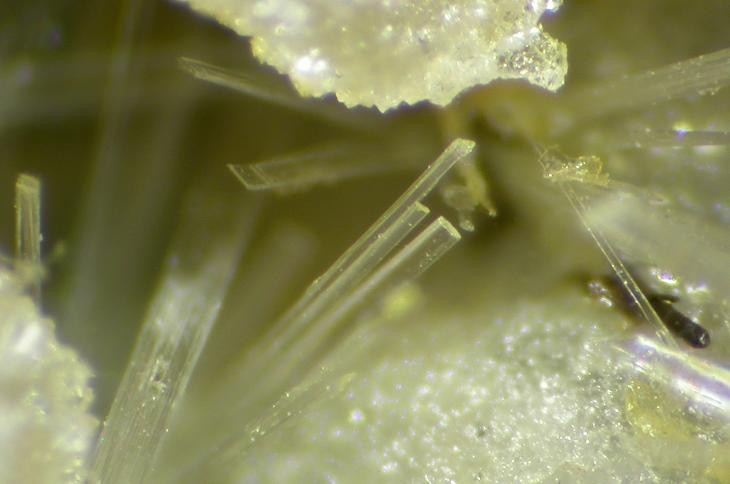
Cervantite, the mineral form of antimony tetroxide

== Formation and structure ==
The material forms when Sb_{2}O_{3} is heated in air:

Sb_{2}O_{3} + 0.5 O_{2} → Sb_{2}O_{4} ΔH = −187 kJ/mol

At 800 °C, antimony(V) oxide loses oxygen to give the same material:

Sb_{2}O_{5} → Sb_{2}O_{4} + 0.5 O_{2} ΔH = −64 kJ/mol

The material is mixed valence, containing both Sb(V) and Sb(III) centers. Two polymorphs are known, one orthorhombic (shown in the infobox) and one monoclinic. Both forms feature octahedral Sb(V) centers arranged in sheets with distorted Sb(III) centers bound to four oxides.
