= Stellerite =

Zeolite mineral

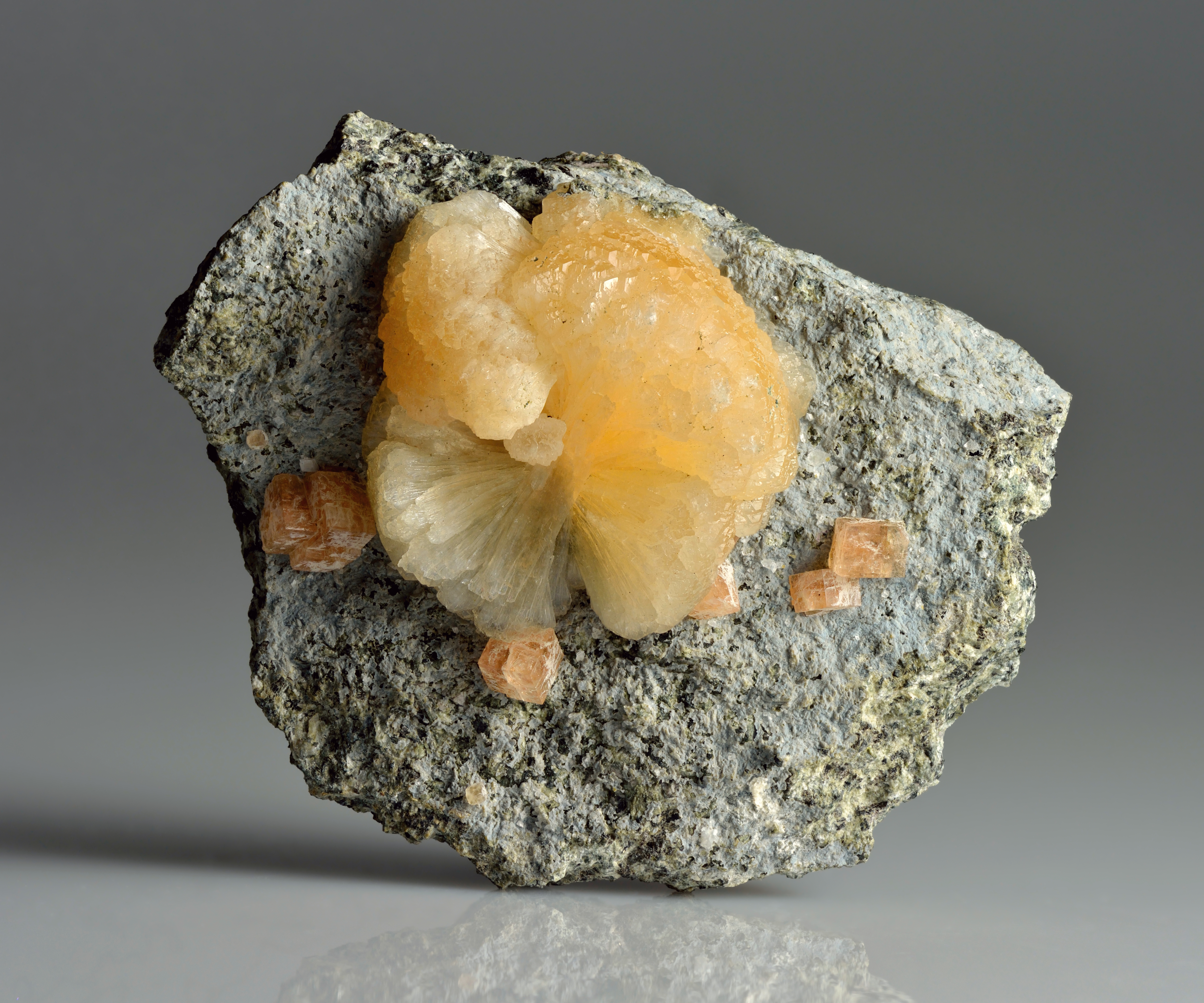

General
- Category: Tectosilicate minerals
- Group: Zeolite group, stilbite subgroup
- Formula: Ca(Al_{2}Si_{7}O_{18})·7H_{2}O
- IMA symbol: Ste
- Strunz classification: 9.GE.15
- Crystal system: Orthorhombic
- Crystal class: Dipyramidal (mmm); H-M symbol: (2/m 2/m 2/m)
- Space group: Fmmm

Identification
- Color: Colorless to white, pink, orange
- Crystal habit: Spherical, Stellate, Tabular
- Cleavage: Perfect on {010}
- Fracture: Uneven
- Mohs scale hardness: 4.5
- Luster: Pearly
- Streak: white
- Diaphaneity: Transparent to translucent
- Specific gravity: approximately 2.2
- Density: 2.13 g/cm3
- Optical properties: Biaxial (-), a=1.4848, b=1.4864-1.4964, g=1.4979
- Birefringence: δ = 0.013

Stellerite is a rare mineral discovered by and named after Georg Wilhelm Steller, a German explorer and zoologist. The mineral has a general formula of Ca[Al_{2}Si_{7}O_{18}]·7H_{2}O. Like most rare minerals, there are few commercial uses for stellerite. Mineral collectors are lucky to find it in good enough crystal form. Zeolites, including stellerite, have been studied using a dehydration process to gauge the potential use of their phases as molecular sieves, sorbents, and catalysts. Its occurrences are in cavities of andesite as sheaf-like clusters of small crystals.

== Crystal habit ==
Stellerite is part of the orthorhombic crystal system which means it has three axes of unequal length that intersect at 90° angles. Its crystal class is rhombic-dipyramidal which means it has three perpendicular two-fold rotational axes with perpendicular mirror planes. Stilbite, another zeolite, is very similar to stellerite in both chemical composition and physical appearance. Stellerite is more commonly found in rounded radiating clusters or as single crystals and appears more transparent than stilbite does.

== Optical properties ==
Stellerite is an anisotropic mineral, meaning that it has different properties in different directions-such as indices of refraction-when light passes through it. A refractive index (n) measures the speed of light in a substance—or in the case of mineralogy—in a mineral. It is expressed as a ratio of the speed of light in vacuum to that in a mineral. Stellerite has three indices of refraction because it is a biaxial mineral.
