= Antimony trioxide (data page) =

Chemical data page

This page provides supplementary chemical data on antimony trioxide.

Also known as Sb_{2}O_{3}. It has a melting point of 656 °C, and a boiling point of 1550 °C. It is a Cubic Crystal Structure with a density of 5.2G/Cm3

== Material Safety Data Sheet ==
- MSDS from SIRI

== Structure and properties ==
Structure and properties
| Index of refraction, n_{D} | ? |
| Dielectric constant, ε_{r} | ? ε_{0} at ? °C |
| Bond strength | ? |
| Bond length | ? |
| Bond angle | ? |
| Magnetic susceptibility | ? |

== Thermodynamic properties ==
Phase behavior
| Triple point | ? K (? °C), ? Pa |
| Critical point | ? K (? °C), ? Pa |
| Std enthalpy change of fusion, Δ_{fus}H^{~~o~~} | ? kJ/mol |
| Std entropy change of fusion, Δ_{fus}S^{~~o~~} | ? J/(mol·K) |
| Std enthalpy change of vaporization, Δ_{vap}H^{~~o~~} | ? kJ/mol |
| Std entropy change of vaporization, Δ_{vap}S^{~~o~~} | ? J/(mol·K) |
Solid properties
| Std enthalpy change of formation, Δ_{f}H^{~~o~~}_{solid} | ? kJ/mol |
| Standard molar entropy, S^{~~o~~}_{solid} | ? J/(mol K) |
| Heat capacity, c_{p} | ? J/(mol K) |
Liquid properties
| Std enthalpy change of formation, Δ_{f}H^{~~o~~}_{liquid} | ? kJ/mol |
| Standard molar entropy, S^{~~o~~}_{liquid} | ? J/(mol K) |
| Heat capacity, c_{p} | ? J/(mol K) |
Gas properties
| Std enthalpy change of formation, Δ_{f}H^{~~o~~}_{gas} | ? kJ/mol |
| Standard molar entropy, S^{~~o~~}_{gas} | ? J/(mol K) |
| Heat capacity, c_{p} | ? J/(mol K) |

== Spectral data ==
UV-Vis
| λ_{max} | ? nm |
| Extinction coefficient, ε | ? |
IR
| Major absorption bands | ? cm^{−1} |
NMR
| Proton NMR |
| Carbon-13 NMR |
| Other NMR data |
MS
| Masses of main fragments |
