= Stilbite =

Tectosilicate mineral of the zeolite group

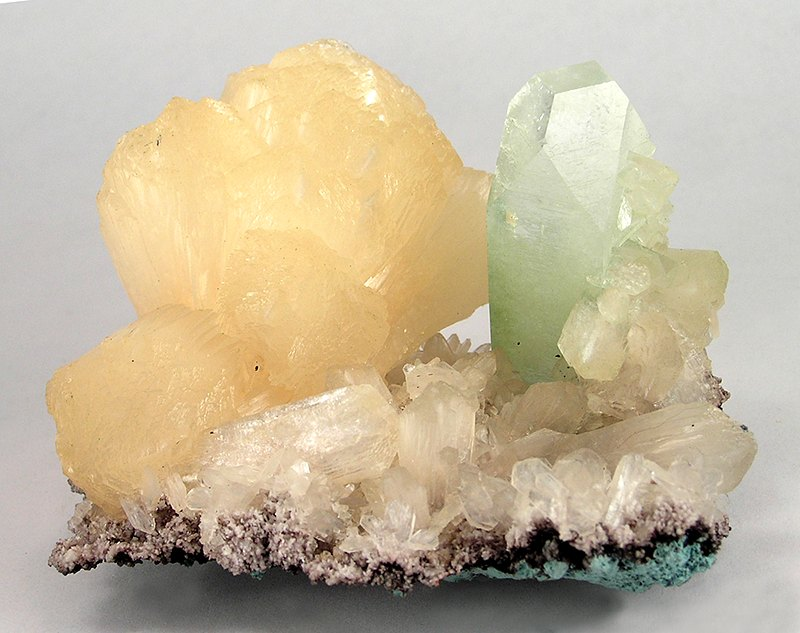

General
- Category: Tectosilicate minerals
- Group: Zeolite group, stilbite subgroup
- Formula: Stilbite-Ca: NaCa_{4}(Si_{27}Al_{9})O_{72}·28(H_{2}O); Stilbite-Na: Na_{9}(Si_{27}Al_{9})O_{72}·28(H_{2}O)
- IMA symbol: Stb
- Strunz classification: 9.GE.10 (10 ed); 8/J.23-30 (8 ed)
- Dana classification: 77.1.4.3
- Crystal system: Monoclinic, also triclinic and orthorhombic
- Crystal class: Prismatic (2/m) (same H-M symbol)
- Space group: C2/m (monoclinic); Amma (orthorhombic)

Identification
- Formula mass: Stilbite-Ca: 2,840 g/mol Stilbite-Na: 2,864 g/mol
- Color: Usually colorless, white or pink
- Crystal habit: Thin tabular, aggregates sheaf-like or in bow-ties, also fibrous and globular.
- Twinning: Very common on {001}
- Cleavage: Perfect on {010}
- Fracture: Conchoidal or uneven
- Tenacity: Brittle
- Mohs scale hardness: 3 1/2 to 4
- Luster: Vitreous, pearly on {010}
- Streak: White
- Diaphaneity: Transparent to translucent
- Specific gravity: 2.12 to 2.22
- Optical properties: Biaxial (−)
- Refractive index: Nx = 1.479 to 1.492, Ny = 1.485 to 1.500, Nz = 1.489 to 1.505 Nx = 1.484 to 1.500, Ny = 1.492 to 1.507, Nz = 1.494 to 1.513
- Fusibility: Easily fused by blowpipe (~1050 °C) to produce a white "enamel"
- Solubility: Decomposes in HCl

Stilbite is the name of a series of tectosilicate minerals of the zeolite group. Prior to 1997, stilbite was recognized as a mineral species, but a reclassification in 1997 by the International Mineralogical Association changed it to a series name, with the mineral species being named:

- Stilbite-Ca
- Stilbite-Na, sometimes also called stiblite

Stilbite-Ca, by far the more common of the two, is a hydrous calcium sodium and aluminium silicate, NaCa_{4}(Si_{27}Al_{9})O_{72}·28(H_{2}O). In the case of stilbite-Na, sodium dominates over calcium. The species are visually indistinguishable, and the series name stilbite is still used whenever testing has not been performed.

== History ==
At one time heulandite and stilbite were considered to be identical minerals. After they were found to be two separate species, in 1818, the name desmine ("a bundle") was proposed for stilbite, and this name is still employed in Germany. The English name "stilbite" is from the Greek stilbein = to shine, because of the pearly luster of the {010} faces.

== Chemistry and related species ==
Stilbite shows a wide variation in exchangeable cations: silicon and aluminium ions occupy equivalent sites and can substitute for each other. Since silicon and aluminium have a different charge (Si^{4+} and Al^{3+}) the ions occupying the sodium/calcium site have to adjust to maintain charge balance. There is a continuous series between stellerite, whose formula can be written as Ca_{4}(Si_{28}Al_{8})O_{72}·28(H_{2}O), and stilbite, and another continuous series between stilbite and barrerite, Na_{8}(Si_{28}Al_{8})O_{72}·26(H_{2}O).

Epistilbite is a distinct zeolite species unrelated to stilbite.

== Crystal class ==
Stilbite is usually monoclinic 2/m, meaning that it has one twofold axis of rotational symmetry perpendicular to a mirror plane. The twofold axis is the crystal axis b, and the a and c crystal axes lie in the mirror plane. For a monoclinic crystal a and c are inclined to each other at an angle β which is not a right angle. For stilbite β is nearly 130°. Stilbite crystals, however, appear to be almost orthorhombic, and a larger unit cell can be chosen, containing two formula units (Z = 2) such that resembles an orthorhombic cell, with all three crystal axes very nearly mutually perpendicular. The mineral is said to be pseudo-orthorhombic.

Non-endmember forms of stilbite may be triclinic or even truly orthorhombic, indeed the framework can have symmetry ranging from orthorhombic to triclinic in a single crystal.

== Habit ==
Crystals are typically thin tabular, flattened parallel to the dominant cleavage and elongated along the a axis. Aggregates may be sheaf-like or in bow-ties, also fibrous and globular. Twinning, cruciform and penetration, is extremely common on {001}.

== Physical and optical properties ==
The color is usually colorless or white, also yellow, brown, pink, salmon, orange, red, green, blue or black. The luster is generally vitreous, and on the perfect cleavage parallel to the plane of symmetry it is markedly pearly. The streak is white and crystals are transparent to translucent. The hardness is 3 1/2 to 4 and the specific gravity 2.12 to 2.22. Cleavage is perfect on {010}, poor on {001}. The mineral is brittle, with a conchoidal or uneven fracture. It is not radioactive.

Stilbite is biaxial (-) with refractive indices:

- Nx = 1.479 to 1.492, Ny = 1.485 to 1.500, Nz = 1.489 to 1.505
- Nx = 1.484 to 1.500, Ny = 1.492 to 1.507, Nz = 1.494 to 1.513

== Unit cell and structure ==
Where sources give cell parameters for stilbite-Na, they are the same as those for stilbite-Ca.

The unit cell can be considered as a monoclinic cell with β close to 130° and one formula unit per unit cell (Z = 1), or as a larger pseudo-orthorhombic cell with β close to 90° and Z = 2.
Cell Parameters for the monoclinic cell:

- a = 13.595 to 13.69 Å, b = 18.197 to 18.31 Å, c = 11.265 to 11.30 Å, β = 127.94 to 128.1°
- a = 13.63 Å, b = 18.17 Å, c = 11.31 Å, β = 129.166°
- a = 13.60 to 13.69 Å, b = 18.20 to 18.31 Å, c = 11.27 Å, β = 128°

Cell parameters for the pseudo-orthorhombic cell:

- a = 13.595 to 13.69 Å, b = 18.197 to 18.31 Å, c = 17.775 to 17.86 Å, β = 90.00 to 90.91°
- a = 13.595 to 13.657 Å, b = 18.197 to 18.309 Å, c = 17.775 to 17.842 Å, β = 90:05 to 90.91° (Z is doubled to Z = 4 because the formula unit halved to NaCa_{2}Al_{5}Si_{13}O_{36}.14H_{2}O)
- a=13.69 Å, b=18.25 Å, c=11.31 Å, β =128.2°
- a = 13.60 to 13.69 Å, b = 18.20 to 18.31 Å, c = 17.78 to 17.86 Å, β = 90.0 to 90.91°

The framework of stilbite is pseudo-orthorhombic with the open channels typical of zeolites. It has 10-member rings and 8-member rings forming channels parallel to a and pseudo-orthorhombic c respectively.

== Uses ==
The open channels in the stilbite structure act like a molecular sieve, enabling it to separate hydrocarbons in the process of petroleum refining.

== Environment ==
Stilbite is a low-temperature secondary hydrothermal mineral. It occurs in the amygdaloidal cavities of basaltic volcanic rocks, in andesites, gneiss and hydrothermal veins. It also forms in hot springs deposits, and as a cementing agent in some sandstones and conglomerates. Stilbite has not been found in sedimentary tuff deposits or deep-sea deposits. Associated minerals are other zeolites, prehnite, calcite and quartz.

== Localities ==
Stilbite is abundant in the volcanic rocks of Iceland, Faroe Islands, Isle of Skye, Bay of Fundy, Nova Scotia (where it is the provincial mineral), northern New Jersey and North Carolina. Salmon-pink crystals occur with pale green apophyllite in the Deccan Traps near Mumbai (Bombay) and Pune, India; white sheaf-like groups encrust the calcite (Iceland-spar) of Berufjord near Djupivogr in Iceland; brown sheafs are found near Paterson, New Jersey in the United States; and crystals of a brick-red color are found at Old Kilpatrick, Scotland.

Iceland is generally considered to be the type locality for stilbite-Ca. It is presumed to be the Helgusta Iceland Spar Mine, along Reydarfjordur. Excellent white bow ties of stilbite are found here on calcite and quartz, associated with heulandite and laumontite in cavities.

The type locality for stilbite-Na is Cape Pula, Pula, Cagliari Province, Sardinia, Italy. Small, lustrous, white or pink, pointed blades of stilbite-Na, and formless masses, up to 5 cm in diameter, have been found there, covering a thin crust of reddish heulandite in large fractures and cavities in the highly weathered volcanic andesite or rhyolite.

The Tertiary Deccan basalts of western India are the most prolific sources of stilbite in the world. Stilbite is the most abundant zeolite in the tholeiitic basalt plateaux near Nasik and Pune and decreases in abundance toward the coast at Mumbai.

== Photo gallery ==
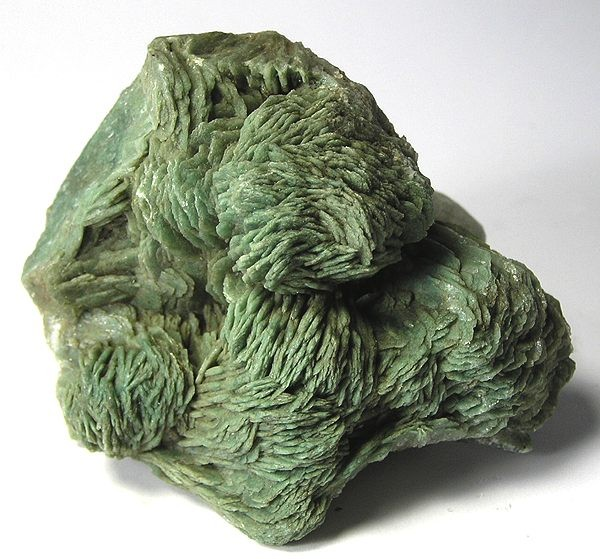
Green Stilbite-Ca, which gets its color from inclusions of celadonite

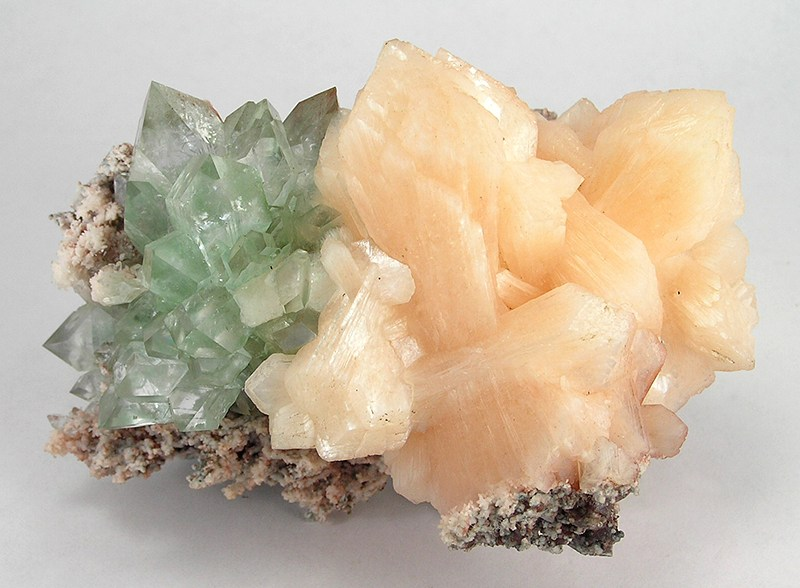
Clustered on a matrix of white chalcedony are a group of light salmon stilbite crystals; adjoining is a cluster of mint green fluorapophyllite crystals

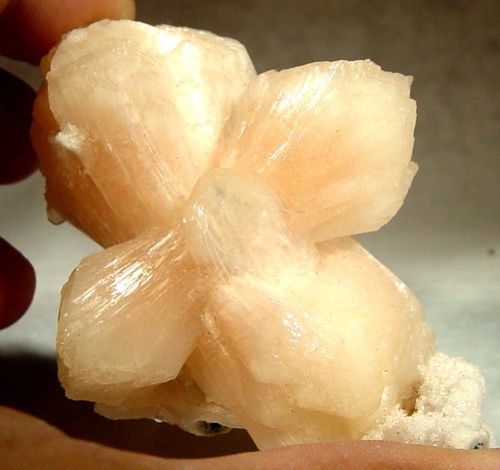
Intergrown pinkish stilbite crystals showing the "bow-tie" tendency from Jalgaon District, Maharashtra, India.

Stilbite crystal aggregates in fan shapes from Wassons Bluff, Nova Scotia.

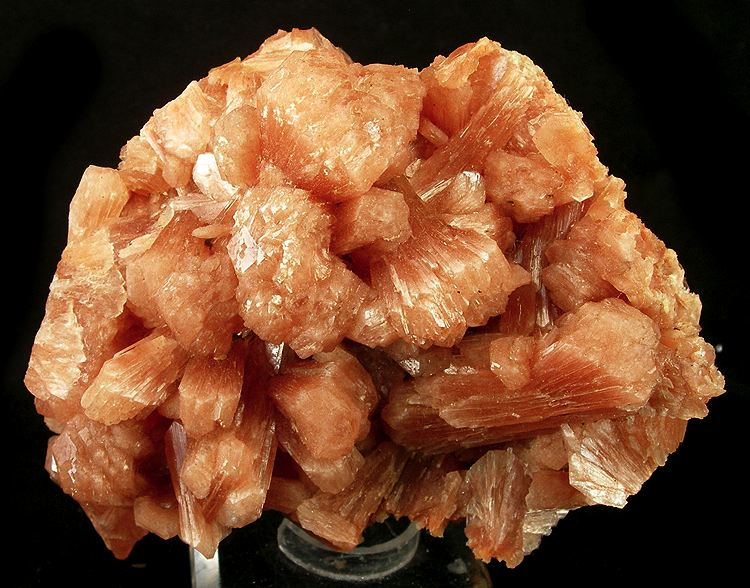
Reddish-orange Stilbite-Ca from Jalgaon District, Maharashtra, India
