= Stibiconite =

Antimony oxide mineral

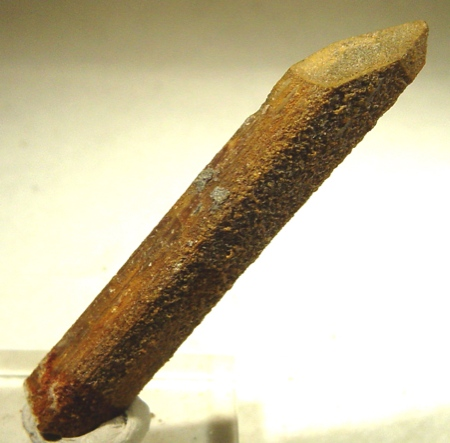
- Stibiconite. From Catorce, San Luis Potosí, Mexico

General
- Category: Oxide minerals
- Formula: Sb^{3+}Sb^{5+}_{2}O_{6}(OH)
- IMA symbol: Sbc
- Strunz classification: 4.DH.20
- Crystal system: Isometric
- Crystal class: Hexoctahedral (m3̅m); H-M symbol: (4/m 3̅ 2/m)
- Space group: Fd3m
- Unit cell: a = 10.27 Å; Z = 8

Identification
- Formula mass: 478.25 g/mol
- Color: Pale yellow to yellowish white, reddish white, orange; gray, brown, black when impure
- Crystal habit: Massive, botryoidal, as incrustations, powdery
- Cleavage: None
- Fracture: Uneven
- Mohs scale hardness: 4–5
- Luster: Vitreous to dull
- Streak: light yellow
- Diaphaneity: Transparent to translucent
- Specific gravity: 4.1 – 5.8, Average = 4.94
- Optical properties: Isotropic
- Refractive index: n = 1.6–1.97

Stibiconite, also formerly known as stiblite or antimony ochre is an antimony oxide mineral with formula: Sb_{3}O_{6}(OH). Its name originates from Greek stíbi (στίβι), 'antimony' and kónis (κόνις), 'powder', alluding to its composition and habit. It is a member of the pyrochlore super group.

== Discovery and occurrence ==
It was first described in 1862 for an occurrence in the Brandholz – Goldkronach District, Fichtel Mountains, Bavaria, Germany.

It occurs as a secondary alteration product of other hydrothermal antimony minerals such as stibnite. It occurs in association with cervantite, valentinite, kermesite, native antimony and stibnite.
