= Brasina =

Brasina Брасина
- Village (Selo)
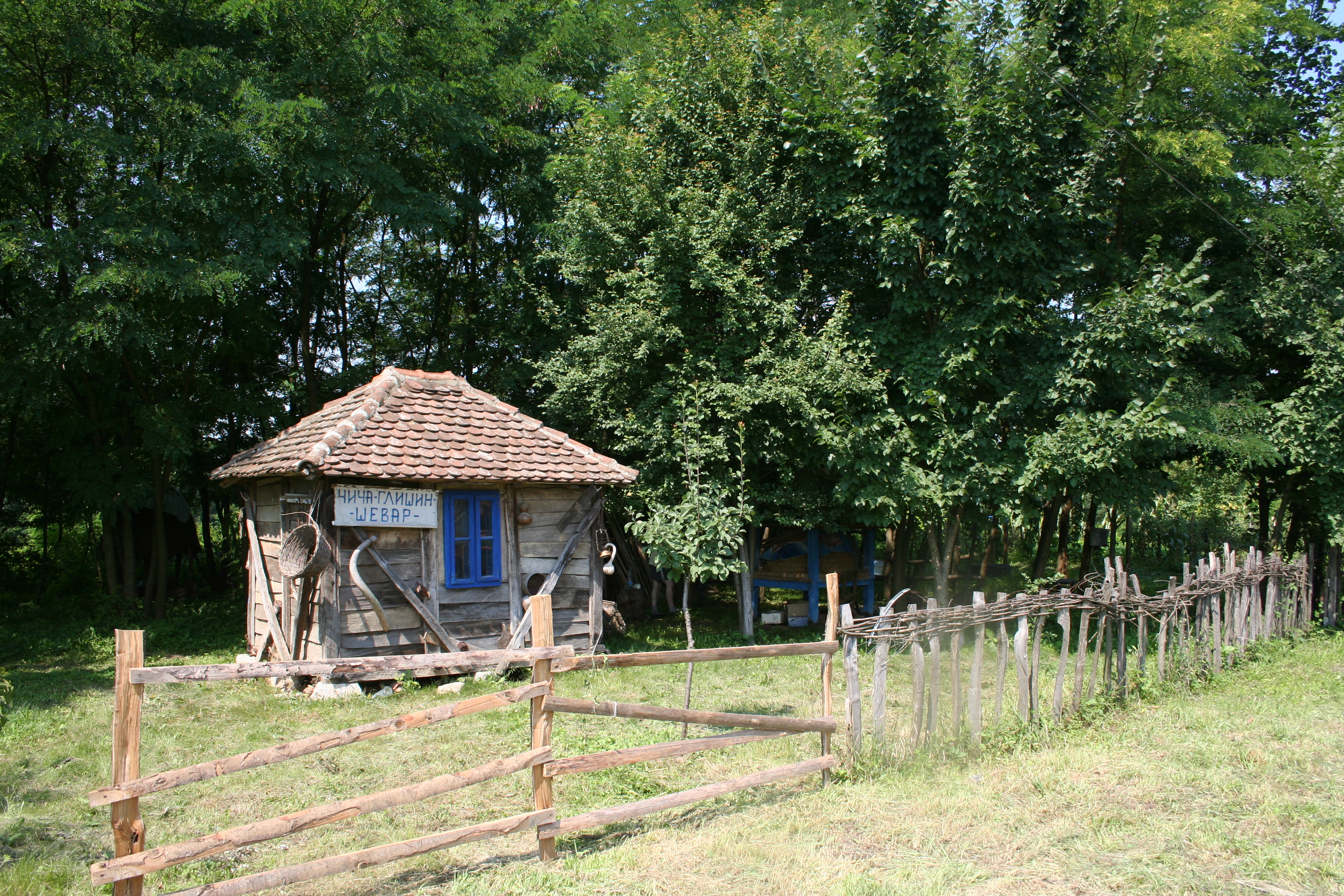

- Location within Serbia
- Coordinates: 44°26′40″N 19°10′23″E
- Country: Serbia
- Municipality: Mali Zvornik
- Time zone: UTC+1 (CET)
  - Summer (DST): UTC+2 (CEST)

Brasina (Serbian Cyrillic: Брасина) is a village in Serbia. It is situated in the Mali Zvornik municipality, in the Mačva District of Central Serbia. The village has a Serb ethnic majority with a population of 1,663 (2002 census).

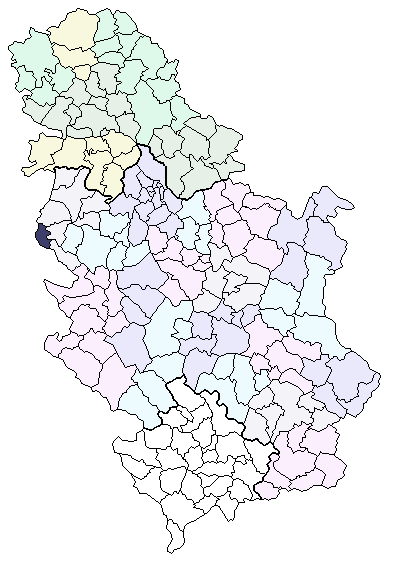
Location of the Mali Zvornik municipality in Serbia

== Historical population ==
- 1948: 953
- 1953: 1,098
- 1961: 1,303
- 1971: 1,410
- 1981: 1,497
- 1991: 1,592
- 2002: 1,663

Historical population
Year	Pop.	±%
1948	953	—
1953	1,098	+15.2%
1961	1,303	+18.7%
1971	1,410	+8.2%
1981	1,497	+6.2%
1991	1,592	+6.3%
2002	1,663	+4.5%
2011	1,479	−11.1%

== See also ==
- List of places in Serbia
