= Losacio =

Coordinates: 41°43′N 6°02′W

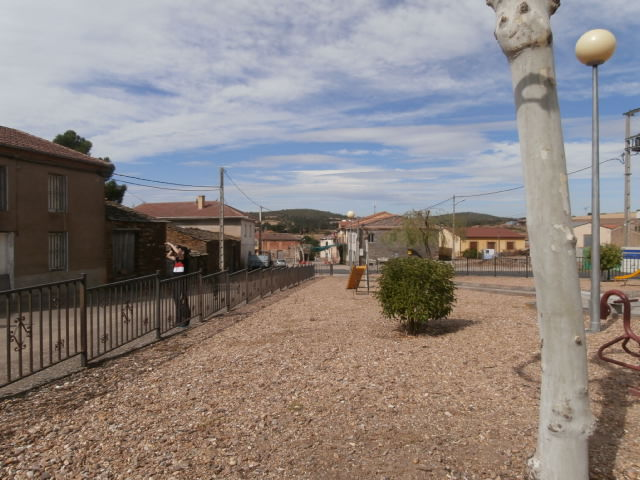
- Interactive map of Losacio
- Country: Spain
- Autonomous community: Castile and León
- Province: Zamora
- Municipality: Losacio

Area
  - Total: 21 km^{2} (8.1 sq mi)

Population (2025-01-01)
  - Total: 90
  - Density: 4.3/km^{2} (11/sq mi)
- Time zone: UTC+1 (CET)
  - Summer (DST): UTC+2 (CEST)
- Website: Official website

Losacio is a municipality located in the province of Zamora, Castile and León, Spain. According to the 2004 census (INE), the municipality has a population of 132 inhabitants.
