= Romeite =

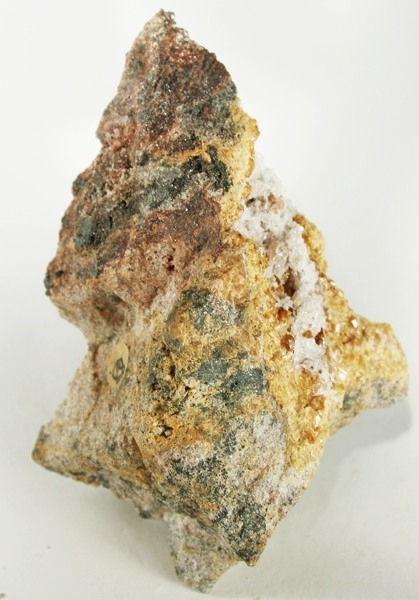

General
- Category: Minerals
- Formula: (Ca,Fe,Mn,Na)_{2}(Sb,Ti)_{2}O_{6}(O,OH,F)
- Crystal system: hexoctahedral

Identification
- Color: Honey-yellow
- Mohs scale hardness: 5.5–6.0

Roméite is a calcium antimonate mineral with the chemical formula (Ca,Fe,Mn,Na)_{2}(Sb,Ti)_{2}O_{6}(O,OH,F). It is a honey-yellow mineral crystallizing in the hexoctahedral crystal system. It has a Mohs hardness of 5.5-6.0. It occurs in Algeria, Australia, Brazil, China, Europe, Japan, New Zealand, and the United States in metamorphic iron-manganese deposits and in hydrothermal antimony-bearing veins.

Its type locality is Prabornaz Mine, Saint-Marcel, Aosta Valley, Italy. It was named after Jean-Baptiste L. Romé de l'Isle. Brugger, et al. (1997) used infrared spectroscopy to measure water content in Roméite crystals.
