= Antimony pentoxide =

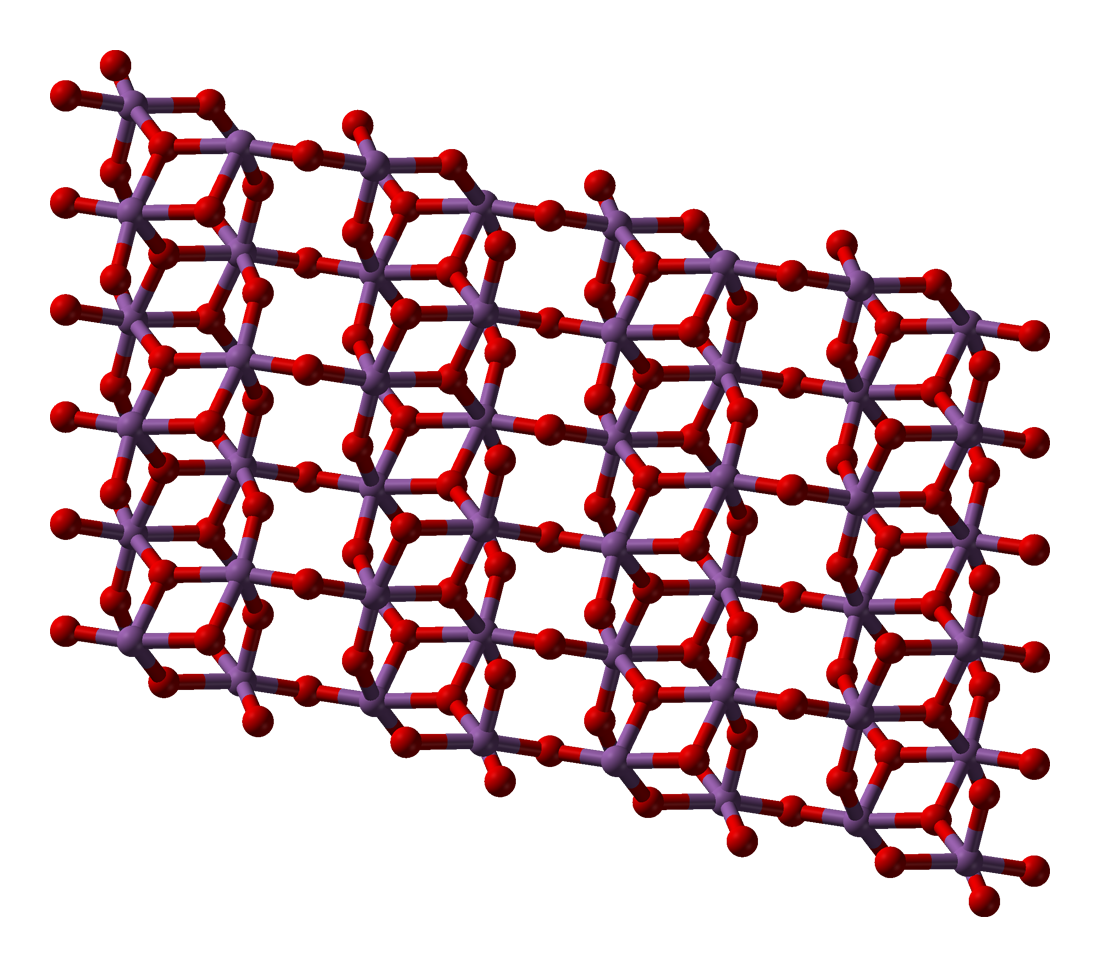

Names
- IUPAC name (dioxo-λ5-stibanyl)oxy-dioxo-λ5-stibane
- Other names antimony(V) oxide

Identifiers
CAS Number	1314-60-9
3D model (JSmol)	Interactive image
ChemSpider	14129
ECHA InfoCard	100.013.853
EC Number	215-237-7
PubChem CID	14813
UNII	756OCG058B
CompTox Dashboard (EPA)	DTXSID6050467
- InChI: InChI=1S/5O.2Sb Key: LJCFOYOSGPHIOO-UHFFFAOYSA-N; InChI=1/5O.2Sb/rO5Sb2/c1-6(2)5-7(3)4 Key: LJCFOYOSGPHIOO-YOUOZQPQAC
- SMILES: O=[Sb](=O)O[Sb](=O)=O

Properties
Chemical formula	Sb_{2}O_{5}
Molar mass	323.517 g/mol
Appearance	yellow, powdery solid
Density	3.78 g/cm^{3}, solid
Melting point	380 °C (716 °F; 653 K) (decomposes)
Solubility in water	0.3 g/100 mL
Solubility	insoluble in nitric acid

Structure
Crystal structure	cubic

Thermochemistry
Heat capacity (C)	117.69 J/mol K
Std enthalpy of formation (Δ_{f}H^{⦵}_{298})	−1008.18 kJ/mol

Hazards
- GHS labelling
Pictograms	(GHS07: Exclamation mark) (GHS09: Environmental hazard) (GHS03: Oxidizing) (GHS08: Health hazard)
Signal word	Danger
Hazard statements	H302, H315, H319, H335, H411
Precautionary statements	P261, P264, P270, P271, P273, P280, P301+P312, P302+P352, P304+P340, P305+P351+P338, P312, P321, P330, P332+P313, P337+P313, P362, P391, P403+P233, P405, P501
NFPA 704 (fire diamond)	3 0 1 OX
- NIOSH (US health exposure limits)
PEL (Permissible)	TWA 0.5 mg/m^{3} (as Sb)
REL (Recommended)	TWA 0.5 mg/m^{3} (as Sb)
- Except where otherwise noted, data are given for materials in their standard state (at 25 °C [77 °F], 100 kPa). verify (what is ?) Infobox references

Antimony pentoxide (molecular formula: Sb_{2}O_{5}) is a chemical compound of antimony and oxygen. It contains antimony in the +5 oxidation state.

== Structure ==
Antimony pentoxide has the same structure as the B form of niobium pentoxide and can be derived from the rutile structure, with antimony coordinated by six oxygen atoms in a distorted octahedral arrangement. The SbO_{6} octahedra are corner- and edge-sharing.

Sb coordination	edge sharing	corner sharing

== Preparation ==
The hydrated oxide is prepared by hydrolysis of antimony pentachloride; or by acidification of potassium hexahydroxoantimonate(V). It may also be prepared by oxidation of antimony trioxide with nitric acid.

== Uses ==
Antimony pentoxide finds use as a flame retardant in ABS and other plastics and as a flocculant in the production of titanium dioxide, and is sometimes used in the production of glass, paint and adhesives.

It is also used as an ion exchange resin for a number of cations in acidic solution including Na^{+} (especially for their selective retentions), and as a polymerization and oxidation catalyst.

== Properties and reactions ==
The hydrated oxide is insoluble in nitric acid, but dissolves in a concentrated potassium hydroxide solution to give potassium hexahydroxoantimonate(V), or KSb(OH)_{6}.

When heated to 700 °C (1,290 °F), the yellow hydrated pentoxide converts to an anhydrous white solid with the formula Sb_{6}O_{13}, containing both antimony(III) and antimony(V). Heating to 900 °C (1,650 °F) produces a white, insoluble powder of Sb_{2}O_{4} in both α and β forms. The β form consists of antimony(V) in octahedral interstices and pyramidal Sb^{III}O_{4} units. In these compounds, the antimony(V) atom is octahedrally coordinated to six hydroxy groups.

The pentoxide can be reduced to antimony metal by heating with hydrogen or potassium cyanide.
