= Cervantite =

Antimony oxide mineral

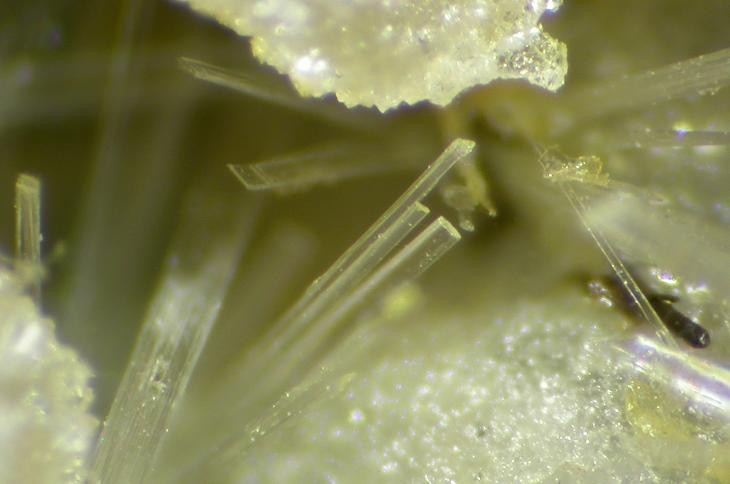
- Microscopic cervantite crystals from Slovakia (3 mm field of view)

General
- Category: Oxide mineral
- Formula: Sb^{3+}Sb^{5+}O_{4}
- IMA symbol: Cvn
- Strunz classification: 4.DE.30
- Crystal system: Orthorhombic
- Crystal class: Pyramidal (mm2) (same H-M symbol)
- Space group: Pbn2_{1}
- Unit cell: a = 5.43 Å, b = 4.81 Å, c = 11.76 Å; Z = 4

Identification
- Color: Yellow to nearly white
- Crystal habit: Microscopic acicular crystals; massive
- Cleavage: Excellent on {001}, distinct on {100}
- Fracture: Conchoidal
- Mohs scale hardness: 4–5
- Luster: Greasy, pearly, earthy
- Streak: Pale yellow to white
- Diaphaneity: Semitransparent
- Specific gravity: 6.5
- Optical properties: Biaxial
- Refractive index: n_{α} = 2.000 n_{γ} = 2.100
- Birefringence: δ = 0.100
- Dispersion: relatively weak

Cervantite, also formerly known as antimony ochre — is an antimony oxide mineral with formula Sb^{3+}Sb^{5+}O_{4} (antimony tetroxide).

It was first described in 1850 for an occurrence in Cervantes, Galicia, Spain, and named for the locality. The mineral was questioned and disapproved, but re-approved and verified in 1962 based on material from the Zajaca-Stolice district, Brasina, Serbia. It occurs as a secondary alteration product of antimony bearing minerals, mainly stibnite.

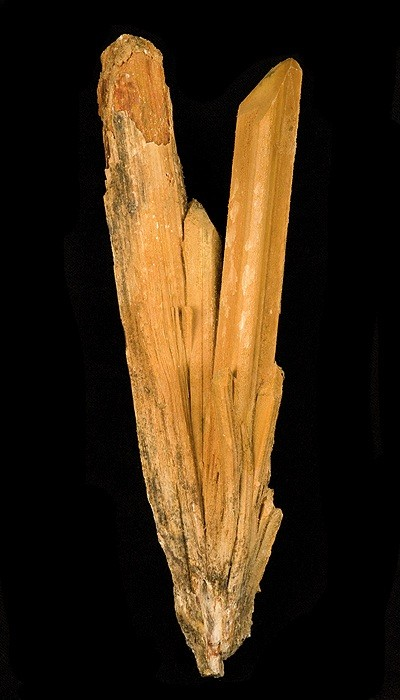
Cervantite and valentinite replacing stibnite from the Xikuangshan Mine of Hunan Province, China (size: 16.1 × 5.0 × 3.0 cm)
