= Valentinite =

Antimony oxide mineral

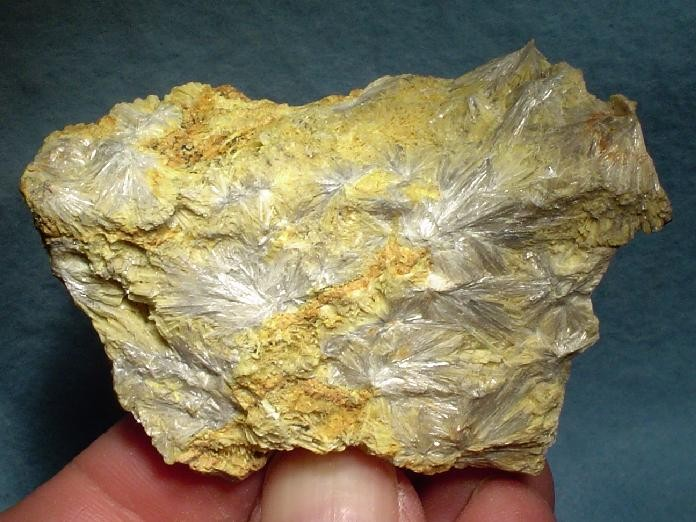
- A sample of valentinite from Algeria (size: 6.9 x 4.4 x 3.3 cm)

General
- Category: Oxide minerals
- Formula: Sb_{2}O_{3}
- IMA symbol: Vln
- Strunz classification: 4.CB.55
- Crystal system: Orthorhombic
- Crystal class: Dipyramidal (mmm); H-M symbol: (2/m 2/m 2/m)
- Space group: Pccn
- Unit cell: a = 4.91 Å, b = 12.46 Å c = 5.42 Å; Z = 4

Identification
- Color: Colorless, snow-white, pale yellow, pink, gray to brownish
- Crystal habit: Prismatic crystals, sometimes flattened, fan-shaped or stellate aggregates of crystals; lamellar, columnar, granular, massive.
- Cleavage: {110}, perfect; {010}, imperfect
- Tenacity: Brittle
- Mohs scale hardness: 2.5–3
- Luster: Adamantine, pearly on cleavages
- Streak: White
- Diaphaneity: Transparent to translucent
- Specific gravity: 5.76
- Optical properties: Biaxial (−)
- Refractive index: n_{α} = 2.180 n_{β} = 2.350 n_{γ} = 2.350
- Birefringence: δ = 0.170
- 2V angle: Very small

Valentinite is an antimony oxide mineral with formula Sb_{2}O_{3}. Valentinite crystallizes in the orthorhombic system and typically forms as radiating clusters of euhedral crystals or as fibrous masses. It is colorless to white with occasional shades or tints of yellow and red. It has a Mohs hardness of 2.5 to 3 and a specific gravity of 5.76. Valentinite occurs as a weathering product of stibnite and other antimony minerals. It is dimorphous with the isometric antimony oxide senarmontite.

== Historical data ==
Valentinite is a mineral named in the middle of the 19th century in honour of Basilius Valentinus, a writer on alchemy. He is the supposed author of the first book to give a detailed description of antimony and its compounds. From the contents of the book it is also obvious that Valentinus was familiar with the synthetic preparation of antimony trioxide, which was called 'the antimony flower'.

Valentinite was first described in 1845 for an occurrence in the Les Chalanches Mine, Allemond, Isère, Auvergne-Rhône-Alpes, France. The first description of its occurrence in the region of Příbram in Bohemia comes roughly from the same time. This particular locality at one time produced the very best crystals of this mineral. The largest crystals found there measured up to 3 cm. Grouped in rich druses, they developed in vein cavities with galena.

== Occurrence ==
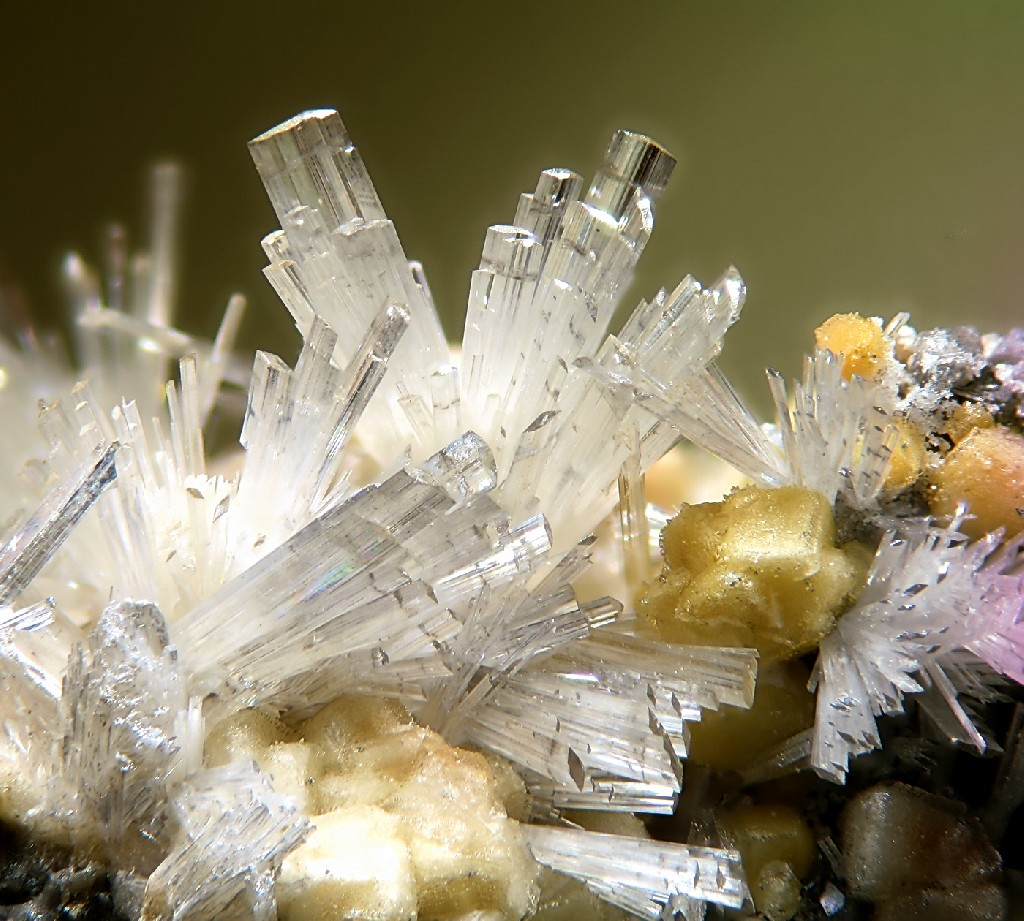
Valentinite from Djebel Nador, Constantine Province, Algeria

Valentinite is a weathering product of hydrothermal antimony-bearing veins, where it forms as a secondary mineral through oxidation in the upper parts of the deposits. It occurs associated with stibnite, native antimony, stibiconite, cervantite, kermesite and tetrahedrite.

A rich deposit of valentinite has been found in the Constantine province of Algeria. This is the only deposit where it is mined as an ore, with 83% antimony. In all other locations it occurs in negligible quantities.

== See also ==
- List of minerals
- List of minerals named after people
