= Stibnite =

Sulfide mineral

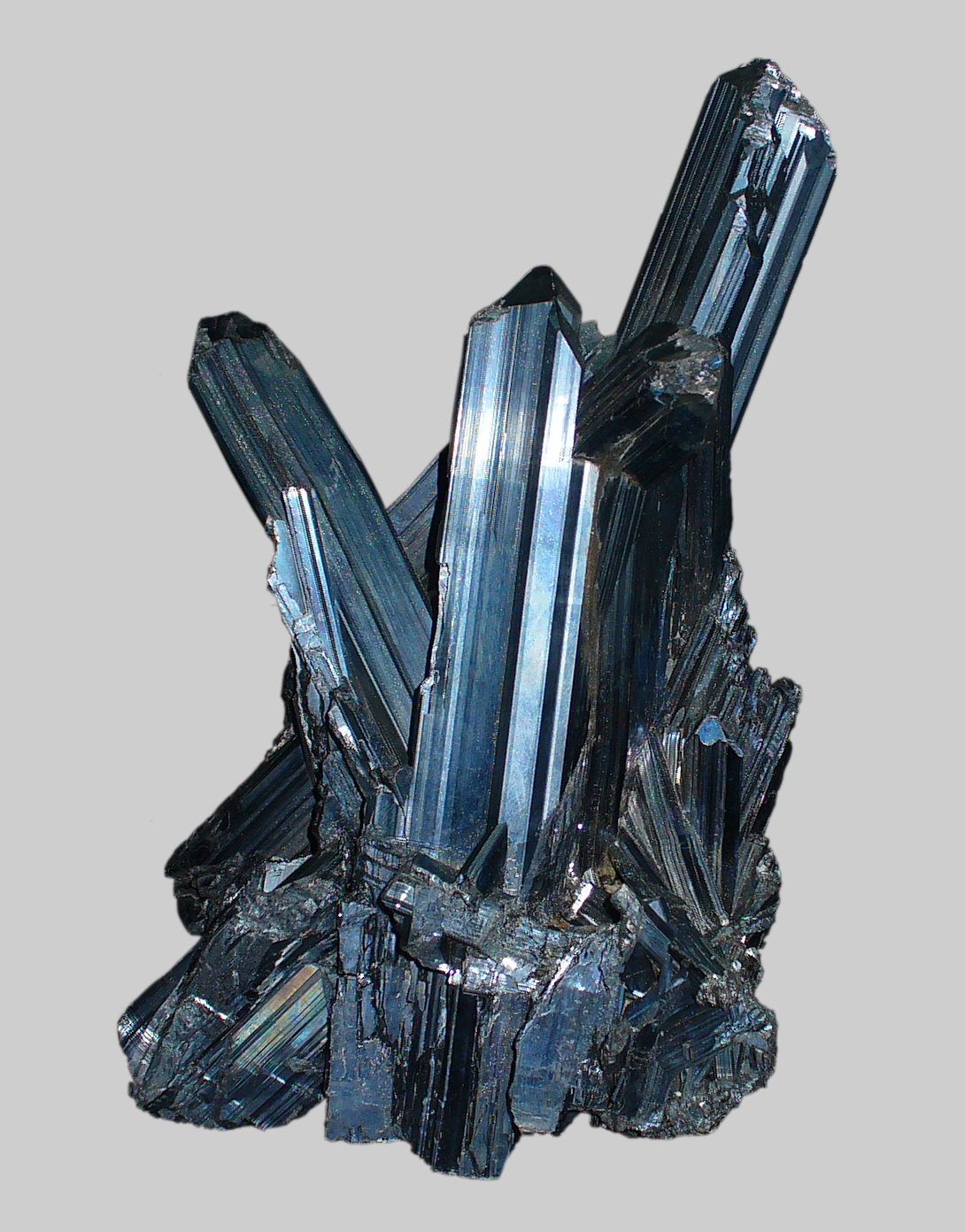

General
- Category: Sulfide mineral
- Formula: Sb_{2}S_{3}
- IMA symbol: Sbn
- Strunz classification: 2.DB.05a
- Crystal system: Orthorhombic
- Crystal class: Dipyramidal (mmm); H-M symbol: (2/m 2/m 2/m)
- Space group: Pbnm
- Unit cell: a = 11.229 Å, b = 11.31 Å, c = 3.8389 Å; Z = 4

Identification
- Color: Lead-gray, tarnishing blackish or iridescent; in polished section, white
- Crystal habit: Massive, radiating and elongated crystals. Massive and granular
- Twinning: Rare
- Cleavage: Perfect and easy on {010}; imperfect on {100} and {110}
- Fracture: Subconchoidal
- Tenacity: Highly flexible but not elastic; slightly sectile
- Mohs scale hardness: 2
- Luster: Metallic
- Streak: Lead grey
- Diaphaneity: Opaque
- Specific gravity: 4.63
- Optical properties: Anisotropic
- Solubility: Decomposed with hydrochloric acid

Major varieties
- Metastibnite: Earthy, reddish deposits

Stibnite, sometimes called antimonite, is a sulfide mineral, a mineral form of antimony trisulfide (Sb_{2}S_{3}). It is a soft, metallic grey crystalline solid with an orthorhombic space group. It is the most important source for the metalloid antimony. The name is derived from the Greek στίβι stibi through the Latin stibium as the former name for the mineral and the element antimony.

== Structure ==
Stibnite has a structure similar to that of arsenic trisulfide, As_{2}S_{3}. The Sb(III) centers, which are pyramidal and three-coordinate, are linked via bent two-coordinate sulfide ions. However, some studies suggest that the actual coordination polyhedra of antimony are SbS_{7}, with (3+4) coordination at the M1 site and (5+2) at the M2 site. Some of the secondary bonds impart cohesion and are connected with packing. Stibnite is grey when fresh, but can turn superficially black due to oxidation in air.

== Properties ==
The melting point of Sb_{2}S_{3} is 823 K (550 °C; 1,022 °F). The band gap is 1.88 eV at room temperature and it is a photoconductor. Stibnite is also toxic upon ingestion, with symptoms similar to those of arsenic poisoning.

== Uses ==
Pastes of Sb_{2}S_{3} powder in fat or in other materials have been used since c. 3000 BC as eye cosmetics in the Mediterranean and farther afield; in this use, Sb_{2}S_{3} is called kohl. It was used to darken the brows and lashes, or to draw a line around the perimeter of the eye.

Antimony trisulfide finds use in pyrotechnic compositions, namely in the glitter and fountain mixtures. Needle-like crystals, "Chinese needles", are used in glitter compositions and white pyrotechnic stars. The "dark pyro" version is used in flash powders to increase their sensitivity and sharpen their report. It is also a component of modern safety matches. It was formerly used in flash compositions, but its use was abandoned due to toxicity and sensitivity to static electricity.

Stibnite was used ever since protodynastic ancient Egypt as a medication and a cosmetic. The Sunan Abi Dawood reports, "prophet Muhammad said: 'Among the best types of collyrium is antimony (ithmid) for it clears the vision and makes the hair sprout.'"

The 17th century alchemist Eirenaeus Philalethes, also known as George Starkey, describes stibnite in his alchemical commentary An Exposition upon Sir George Ripley's Epistle. Starkey used stibnite as a precursor to philosophical mercury, which was itself a hypothetical precursor to the philosopher's stone.

== Occurrence ==
Stibnite occurs in hydrothermal deposits and is associated with realgar, orpiment, cinnabar, galena, pyrite, marcasite, arsenopyrite, cervantite, stibiconite, calcite, ankerite, barite and chalcedony.

Small deposits of stibnite are common, but large deposits are rare. The world's largest deposit of antimony, the Xikuangshan mine, yields high quality crystals in paragenesis with calcite. It occurs in Canada, Mexico, Peru, Japan, Germany, Romania, Italy, France, England, Algeria, and Kalimantan, Borneo. In the United States it is found in Arkansas, Idaho, Nevada, California, and Alaska.

Historically, the Romans used stibnite mined in Dacia to make colourless glass, the making of which ended when this province was lost to the Roman Empire.

As of May 2007, the largest specimen on public display (1000 pounds) is at the American Museum of Natural History. The largest documented single crystals of stibnite measured ~60×5×5 cm and originated from different locations including Japan, France and Germany.

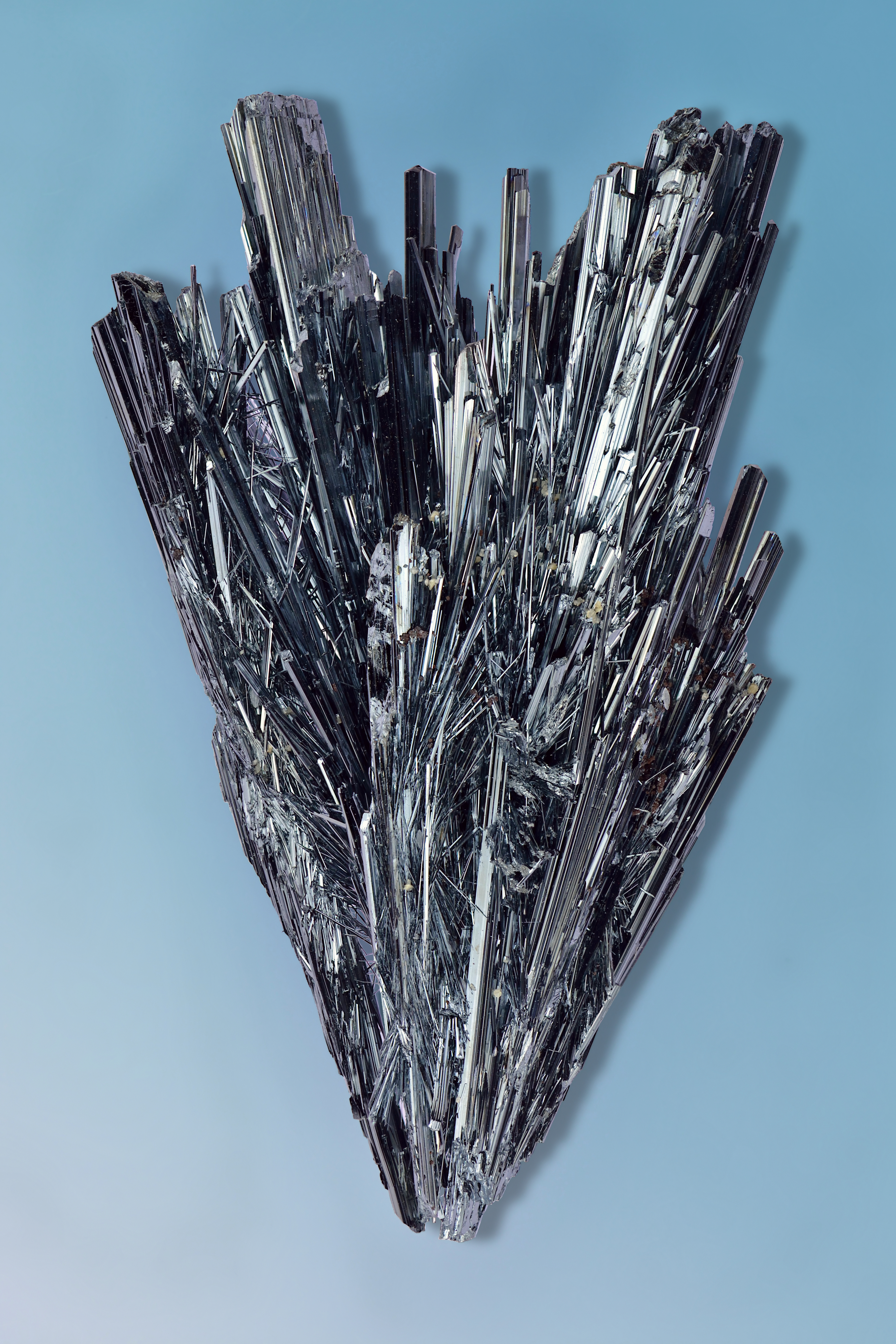
Stibnite from Herja mine, Romania

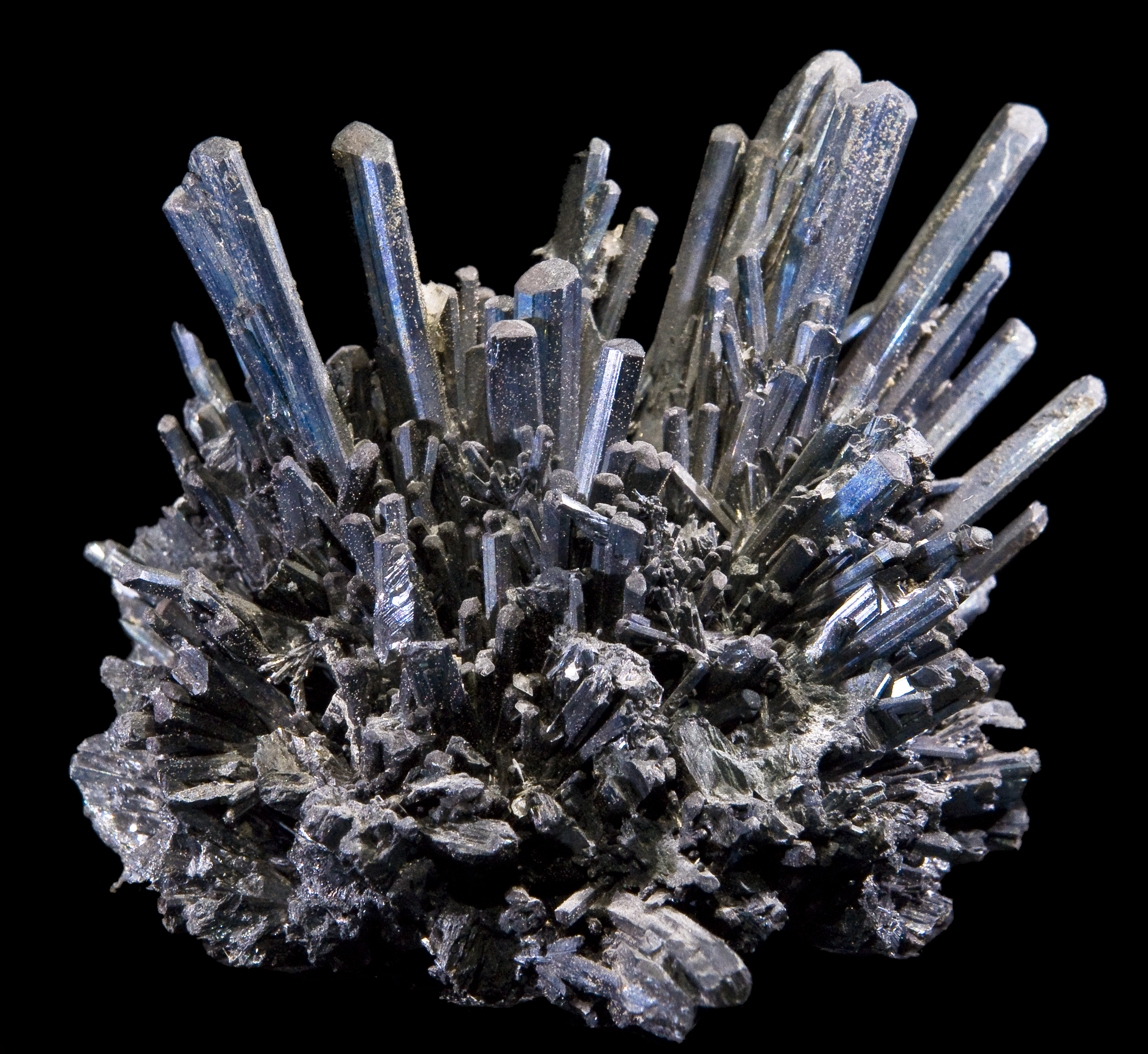
Stibnite from Herja mine, Romania

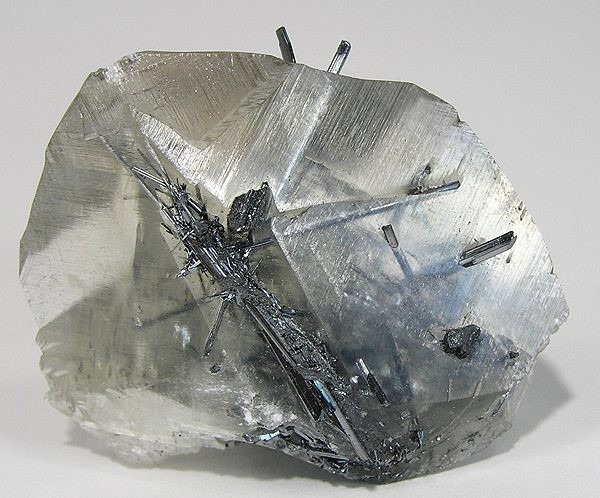
Needles of stibnite within a transparent crystal of calcite (size: 4.5×3.5×1.8 cm)

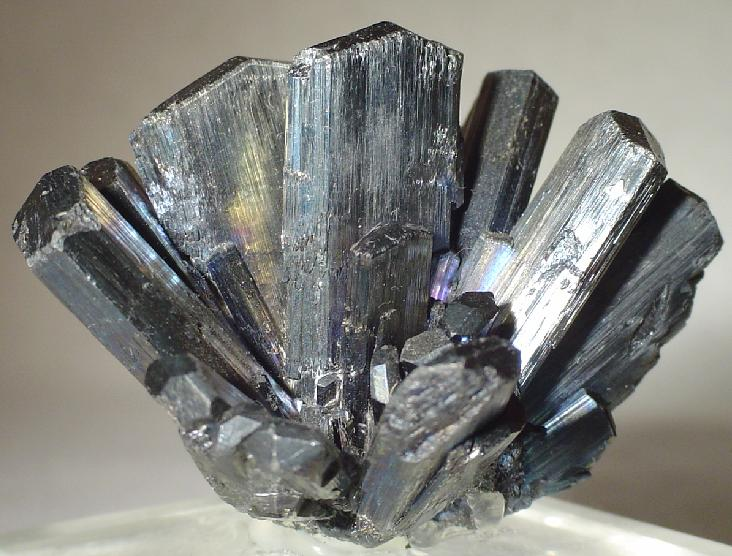
Ray of sharp, striated, iridescent metallic stibnite blades

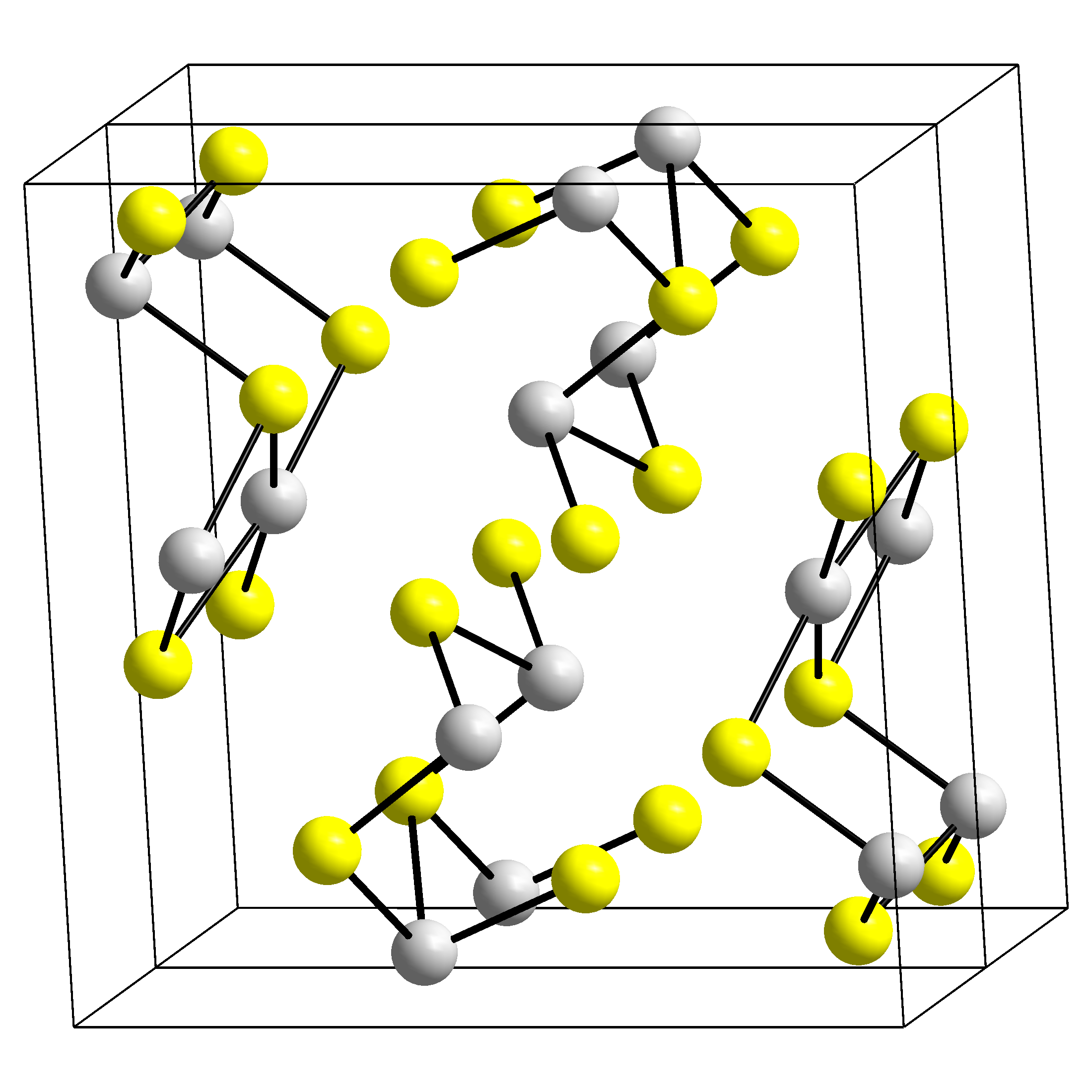
Structure of stibnite

== See also ==
- List of minerals
- Stibnides, compounds of antimony
