= Antimony trioxide =

Antimony(III) oxide
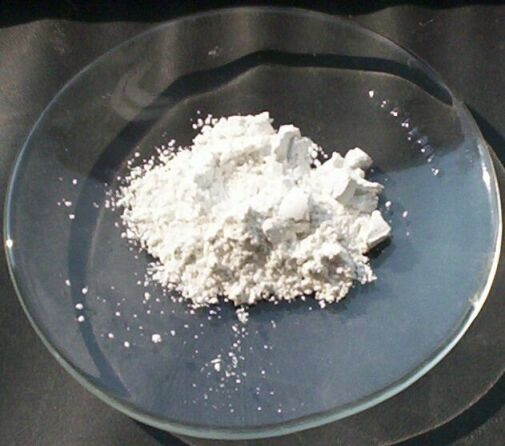
- Antimony(III) oxide

Names
- IUPAC name Antimony(III) oxide
- Other names Antimony sesquioxide Antimonous oxide Flowers of Antimony

Identifiers
CAS Number	1309-64-4
3D model (JSmol)	Interactive image
ChemSpider	25727
ECHA InfoCard	100.013.796
EC Number	215-474-6
KEGG	C19192
PubChem CID	14794
RTECS number	CC5650000
UNII	P217481X5E
CompTox Dashboard (EPA)	DTXSID4023880
- InChI: InChI=1S/3O.2Sb Key: ADCOVFLJGNWWNZ-UHFFFAOYSA-N; InChI=1/3O.2Sb/rO3Sb2/c1-4-3-5-2 Key: ADCOVFLJGNWWNZ-VTKDZCJOAA
- SMILES: O=[Sb]O[Sb]=O

Properties
Chemical formula	Sb_{2}O_{3}
Molar mass	291.518 g/mol
Appearance	white solid
Odor	odorless
Density	5.2 g/cm^{3}, α-form 5.67 g/cm^{3} β-form
Melting point	656 °C (1,213 °F; 929 K)
Boiling point	1,425 °C (2,597 °F; 1,698 K) (sublimes)
Solubility in water	370±37 μg/L between 20.8 °C and 22.9 °C
Solubility	soluble in acid
Magnetic susceptibility (χ)	−69.4×10^{−6} cm^{3}/mol
Refractive index (n_{D})	2.087, α-form 2.35, β-form

Structure
Crystal structure	cubic (α) < 570 °C orthorhombic (β) > 570 °C
Coordination geometry	pyramidal
Dipole moment	zero

Hazards
- GHS labelling
Pictograms	(GHS08: Health hazard)
Signal word	Warning
Hazard statements	H351
Precautionary statements	P281
NFPA 704 (fire diamond)	2 0 0
- Lethal dose or concentration (LD, LC)
LD_{50} (median dose)	7000 mg/kg, oral (rat)
- NIOSH (US health exposure limits)
PEL (Permissible)	TWA 0.5 mg/m^{3} (as Sb)
REL (Recommended)	TWA 0.5 mg/m^{3} (as Sb)

Related compounds
Other anions	Antimony trisulfide Antimony triselenide Antimony telluride
Other cations	Dinitrogen trioxide Phosphorus trioxide Arsenic trioxide Bismuth trioxide
Related compounds	Diantimony tetraoxide Antimony pentoxide

Supplementary data page
- Antimony trioxide (data page)
- Except where otherwise noted, data are given for materials in their standard state (at 25 °C [77 °F], 100 kPa). verify (what is ?) Infobox references

Antimony(III) oxide is the inorganic compound with the formula Sb_{2}O_{3}. It is the most important commercial compound of antimony. It is found in nature as the minerals valentinite and senarmontite. A mixed arsenic-antimony oxide occurs in nature as the very rare mineral stibioclaudetite.

== Production and properties ==
Global production of antimony(III) oxide in 2012 was 130,000 tonnes, an increase from 112,600 tonnes in 2002. China produces the largest share followed by US/Mexico, Europe, Japan and South Africa and other countries (2%).

As of 2010, antimony(III) oxide was produced at four sites in the EU. It is produced via two routes, re-volatilizing of crude antimony(III) oxide and by oxidation of antimony metal. Oxidation of antimony metal dominates in Europe. Several processes for the production of crude antimony(III) oxide or metallic antimony from virgin material. The choice of process depends on the composition of the ore and other factors. Typical steps include mining, crushing and grinding of ore, sometimes followed by froth flotation and separation of the metal using pyrometallurgical processes (smelting or roasting) or in a few cases (e.g. when the ore is rich in precious metals) by hydrometallurgical processes. These steps do not take place in the EU but closer to the mining location.

=== Re-volatilizing of crude antimony(III) oxide ===
Crude stibnite is oxidized to crude antimony(III) oxide using furnaces operating at approximately 500 to 1,000 °C. The reaction is the following:

2 Sb_{2}S_{3} + 9 O_{2} → 2 Sb_{2}O_{3} + 6 SO_{2}

The crude antimony(III) oxide is then purified by sublimation.

=== Oxidation of antimony metal ===
Antimony metal is oxidized to antimony(III) oxide in furnaces. The reaction is exothermic. Antimony(III) oxide is formed through sublimation and recovered in bag filters. The size of the formed particles is controlled by process conditions in furnace and gas flow. The reaction can be schematically described by:

4 Sb + 3 O_{2} → 2 Sb_{2}O_{3}

=== Properties ===
Antimony(III) oxide is an amphoteric oxide. It dissolves in aqueous sodium hydroxide solution to give the meta-antimonite NaSbO_{2}, which can be isolated as the trihydrate. Antimony(III) oxide also dissolves in concentrated mineral acids to give the corresponding salts, which hydrolyzes upon dilution with water. With nitric acid, the trioxide is oxidized to antimony(V) oxide.

When heated with carbon, the oxide is reduced to antimony metal. With other reducing agents such as sodium borohydride or lithium aluminium hydride, the unstable and very toxic gas stibine is produced. When heated with potassium bitartrate, a complex salt potassium antimony tartrate, (K_{2}Sb_{2}(C_{4}H_{2}O_{6})_{2}·3H_{2}O) is formed.

== Structure ==
The structure of Sb_{2}O_{3} depends on the temperature of the sample. Dimeric Sb_{4}O_{6} is the high temperature (1560 °C) gas. Sb_{4}O_{6} molecules are bicyclic cages, similar to the related oxide of phosphorus(III), phosphorus trioxide. The cage structure is retained in a solid that crystallizes in a cubic habit. The Sb–O distance is 197.7 pm and the O–Sb–O angle of 95.6°. This form exists in nature as the mineral senarmontite. Above 606 °C, the more stable form is orthorhombic, consisting of pairs of -Sb-O-Sb-O- chains that are linked by oxide bridges between the Sb centers. This form exists in nature as the mineral valentinite.

Sb_{4}O_{6}	senarmontite	valentinite

== Uses ==
The annual consumption of antimony(III) oxide in the United States and Europe is approximately 10,000 and 25,000 tonnes, respectively. The main application is as flame retardant synergist in combination with halogenated materials. The combination of halogens and antimony is key to the flame-retardant action of polymers, helping to form less flammable chars. Such flame retardants are found in electrical apparatuses, textiles, leather, and coatings.

Other applications:

- Antimony(III) oxide is an opacifying agent for glasses, ceramics and enamels.
- Some specialty pigments contain antimony.
- Antimony(III) oxide is a useful catalyst in the production of polyethylene terephthalate (PET plastic) and the vulcanization of rubber.

== Safety ==
Antimony(III) oxide has suspected carcinogenic potential for humans. Its TLV is 0.5 mg/m^{3}, as for most antimony compounds. Before 2021, no other human health hazards were identified for antimony(III) oxide, and no risks to human health and the environment were identified from the production and use of antimony trioxide in daily life. However, the 15th Report on Carcinogens released on December 21, 2021, by the US Department of Health and Human Services categorised antimony(III) oxide as carcinogenic.
