= Carmine =

Pigment, aluminium salt of carminic acid

Names
- Systematic IUPAC name aluminium;calcium;1-methyl-3,5,6,8-tetraoxido-9,10-dioxo-7-[(2S,3R,4R,5S,6R)-3,4,5-trihydroxy-6-(hydroxymethyl)oxan-2-yl]anthracene-2-carboxylate
- Other names: carmine red; cochineal; crimson lake; carmine lake; Natural Red 4; C.I. 75470

Identifiers
CAS Number	1390-65-4
ChemSpider	28296172
ECHA InfoCard	100.014.295
E number	E120 (colours)
PubChem CID	102004931
CompTox Dashboard (EPA)	DTXSID20859613 DTXSID2044216, DTXSID20859613

Properties
Chemical formula	C_{44}H_{43}AlCa_{2}O_{30}
Molar mass	1158.936 g·mol^{−1}
Melting point	298–300 °C (568–572 °F; 571–573 K)
Solubility in water	insoluble < pH 11
- Except where otherwise noted, data are given for materials in their standard state (at 25 °C [77 °F], 100 kPa). Infobox references

Carmine (/ˈkɑːrmən, ˈkɑːrmaɪn/) – also called cochineal (when it is extracted from the cochineal insect), cochineal extract, crimson lake, or carmine lake – is a pigment of a bright-red color obtained from the aluminium complex derived from carminic acid. Specific code names for the pigment include natural red 4, C.I. 75470, or E120. Carmine is also a general term for a particularly deep-red color.

== Etymology ==
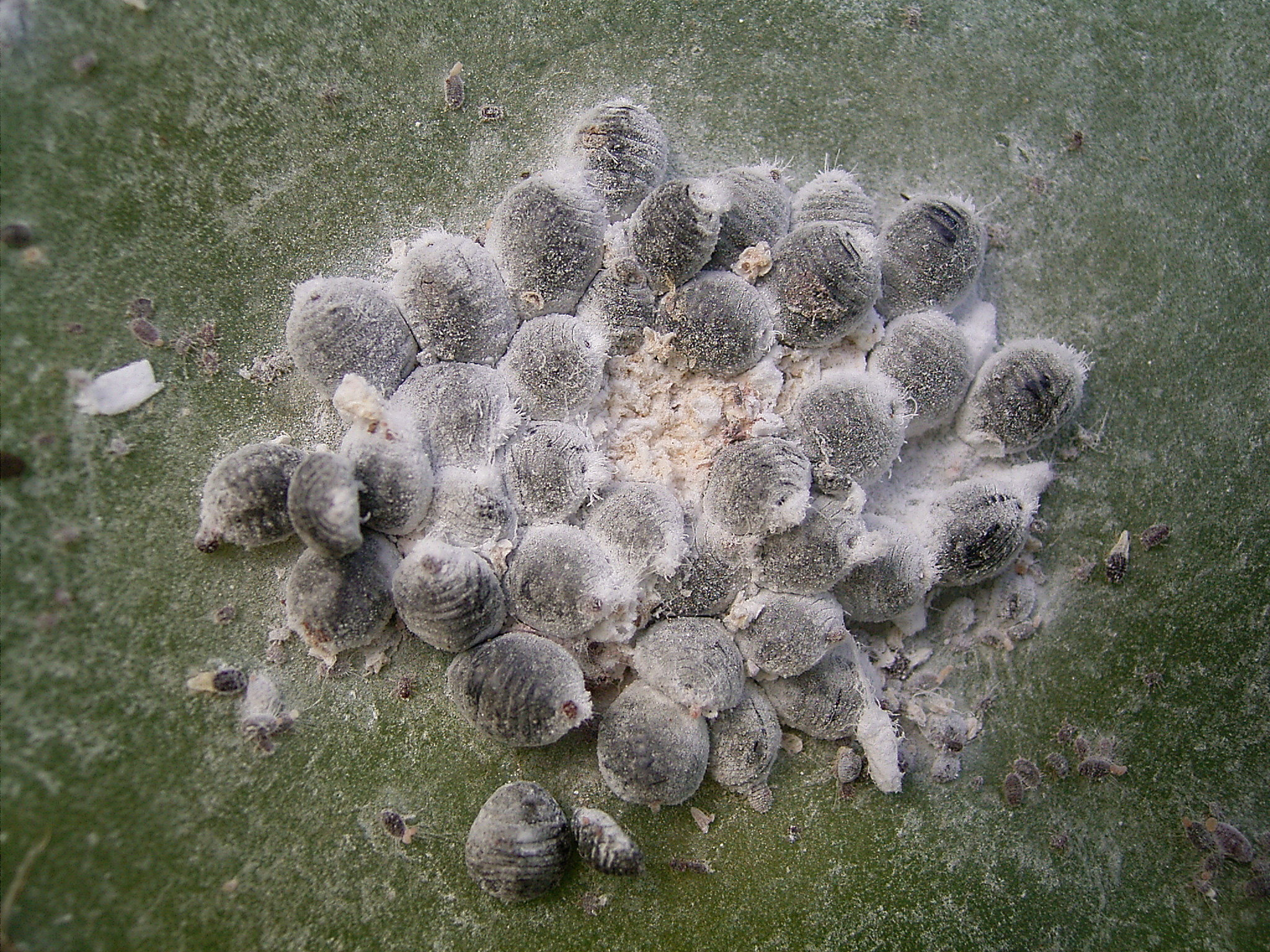
A cluster of Dactylopius coccus (cochineal scale) females growing in Barlovento, Canary Islands

The English word carmine is derived from the French word carmin (12th century), from Medieval Latin carminium, from Arabic قرمز qirmiz ('crimson') and from Armenian կարմիր carmir ('red'), which both derive from Middle Persian carmir ('red, crimson'). The Persian term carmir is likely cognate with Sanskrit क्रिमिग krimiga ('insect-produced'), from कृमि॑ kṛ́mi ('worm, insect'). The Modern Persian word for 'worm, insect' is کرم kirm, and in Iran (Persia) the red colorant carmine was extracted from the bodies of dead female insects such as Kermes vermilio and cochineal. The form of the term may also have been influenced in Latin by minium ('red lead, cinnabar'), said to be of Iberian origin.

The word carmine has been used as a color name as early as 1799. It is a popular food color, used in yogurt, candy, gelatin, meat, and beverages including fruit juices.

== History ==
Female Dactylopius coccus (cochineal) insects were used for their red coloring power as early as 700 BC. American civilizations (from the American continent) crushed the bugs present on cacti to extract the carmine they contain. Carmine pigment was extensively used by the Aztec civilization to dye textiles. It was imported later to Europe during the 16th century.

Red is a color often associated with power and social status. Through the centuries, red has been worn by tribal chiefs, kings and queens, and military officers.

Cochineal was a major source of income for the Spanish Crown. By weight, it was a far more valuable commodity than sugar, making it especially lucrative for overseas trade. As part of the triangular trade, its production and consumption were intertwined with slavery.

In European markets, the Spanish Crown had a monopoly on cochineal until 1820 when the French learned to cultivate them. Later, German and British scientists created a synthetic red dye that competed with carmine. The combination of these factors contributed to the end of the Spanish monopoly and considerably lowered the price of carmine, making it accessible to a wider audience.

== Production ==
The pigment is produced from carminic acid, which is extracted from some scale insects such as the cochineal scale (Prima), and certain Porphyrophora species (Armenian cochineal and Polish cochineal). Attempts have been made to farm cochineal.

Carmine is a colorant used in the manufacture of artificial flowers, paints, crimson ink, rouge and other cosmetics, and some medications.

Synthetic carminic acid is complex and expensive to produce. Therefore, natural cochineal carmine is predominant on the market. Its instability presents challenges for use in art and textiles, but this is less of a hindrance in the context of cosmetics. As its synthetic production is still largely experimental, ongoing research focuses on improving the efficiency and sustainability of the synthetic pathways.

=== Preparation ===
To prepare carmine, the powdered scale insect bodies are boiled in an ammonia or sodium carbonate solution. After separating the insoluble matter, the extract is treated with alum to precipitate the red solid. This precipitate is called "carmine lake" or "crimson lake". Purity of color is ensured by the absence of iron. Stannous chloride, citric acid, borax, or gelatin may be added to modify the precipitation. The traditional crimson color is affected not only by carminic acid but also by choice of its chelating metal salt ion. For shades of purple, lime is added to the alum.

To obtain 1 pound (0.45 kilograms) of red dye, 70,000 cochineal insects are required.

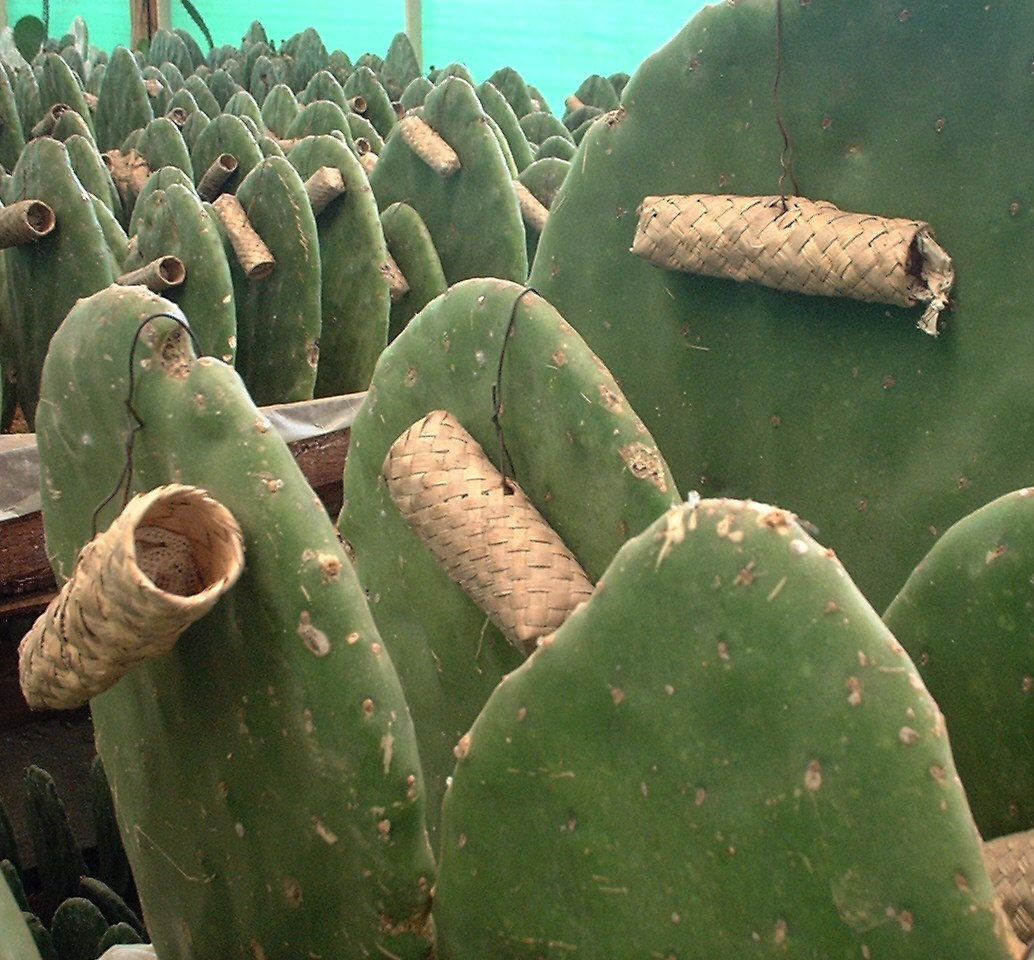
Zapotec cochineal nests on Opuntia ficus-indica host cacti

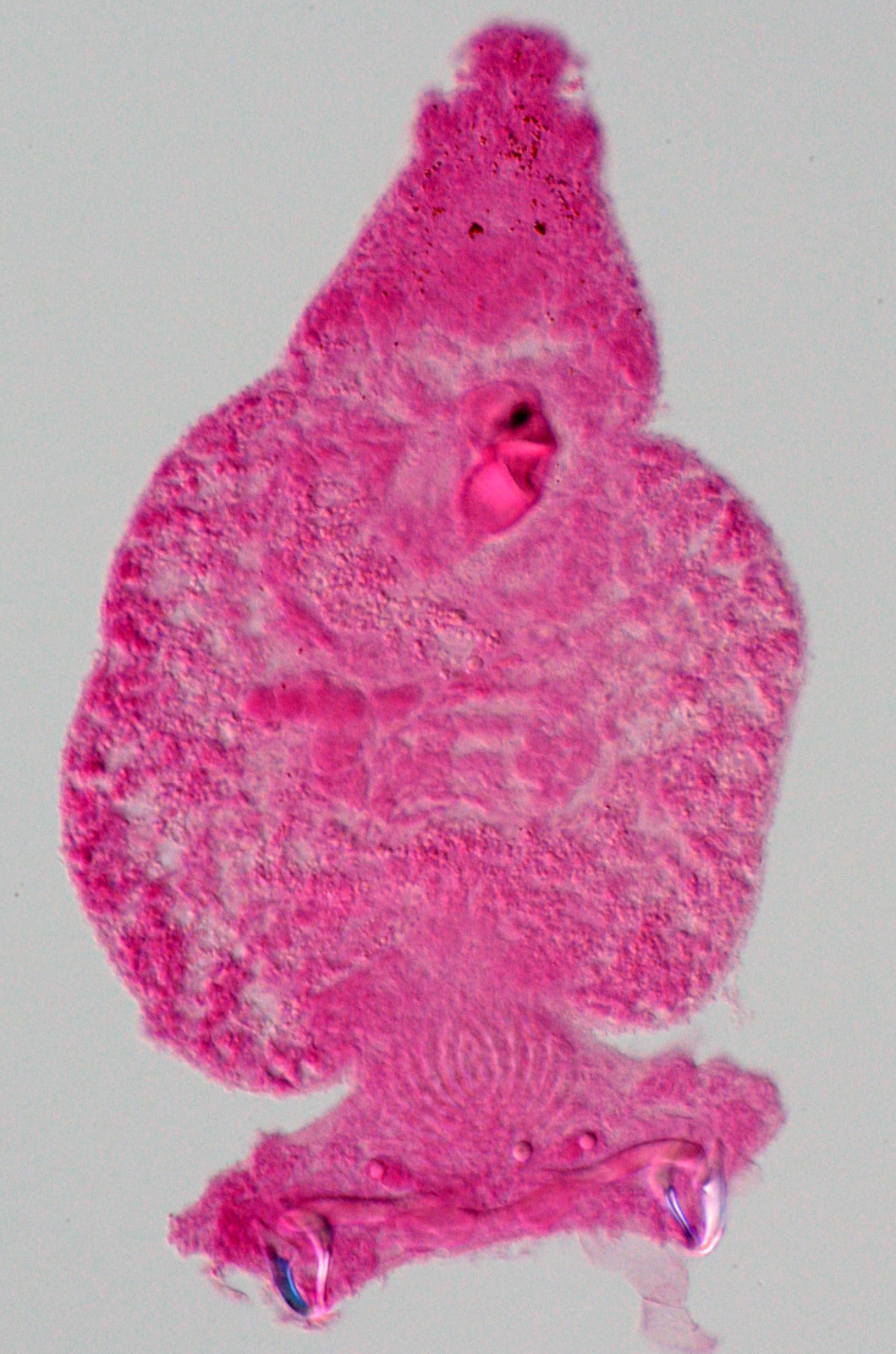
Use of carmine as a staining agent in histology (here on a flatworm)

== Identification and characteristics ==
Carminic acid structure

Structure proposed for carmine.

Scientists can detect the presence of carminic acid through liquid chromatography and a diode array detector combined with a mass spectrometer with a quadrupole-time-of-flight analyzer (LC-DAD-QTOF). The process is used for identifying carmine in works of art.

Scientific methods can also distinguish among the different species of cochineal used in artworks.

=== Wavelength ===
As confirmed by reflectance spectroscopy, carmine reflects mostly red light. Its hue ranges from a vibrant red with a dominant wavelength of 612 nm to a dark purplish red with a complementary wavelength of 497 nm.

=== Hue ===
The hue of carmine is dependent on the metallic ions present in the pigment. For instance, carmine combined with zinc or aluminium yields a crimson hue.

=== Translucence ===
The translucence of carmine depends on its binding medium. Mixed with oil, carmine remains translucent and adequate for glazes. Combined with tempera or glue, carmine turns opaque.

=== Value ===
On the Munsell color scale, carmine's value can range between 3.32 and 6.35.

== Permanence ==
Carmine is a fugitive color, whose fading is influenced by different factors such as light, humidity, or even the color of the glass of a frame. It is highly sensitive to light and tends to fade into brownish tones.

In painting, its durability depends on the type of binding. For instance, pigments are more stable if mixed with linseed oil rather than with gum arabic. It is especially sensitive to light in watercolor. Carmine can be stabilized when precipitated with alum and when combined with tin salt mordants.

== Notable occurrences in art ==
Carmine was used in dyeing textiles and in painting since antiquity. Numerous examples are found among Inca remains such as textile artifacts. The Aztecs also used carmine.

In Europe, the 16th century Italian painter Jacopo Tintoretto used carmine in several of his paintings, the most notable being Portrait of Vincenzo Morosini (1575-80) and Christ Washing the Feet of the Disciples(1575-80).

Carmine was also used by nineteenth-century artists such as Vincent van Gogh in Bedroom in Arles (1889). The floor of the bedroom is painted with carmine cochineal lake, geranium lake and indigo. This produced a reddish color, which over time changed to blueish.

Analysis of J. M. W. Turner's palettes found that he used cochineal carmine. The fading of this pigment affected the appearance of the sky in The Fighting Temeraire (1839).

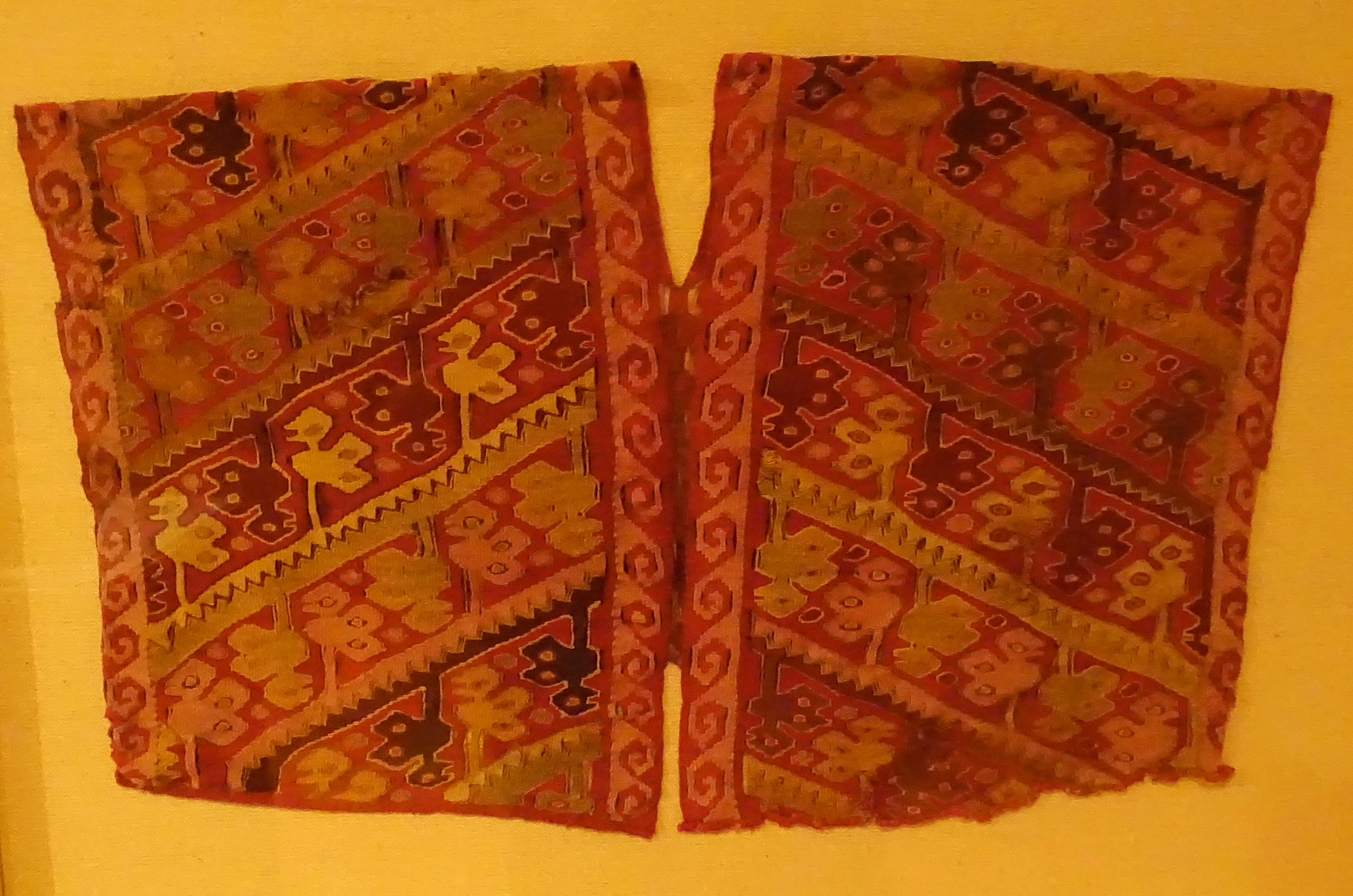
Tapestry shirt fragment, Peru, Chancay, c. 1000-1470 AD

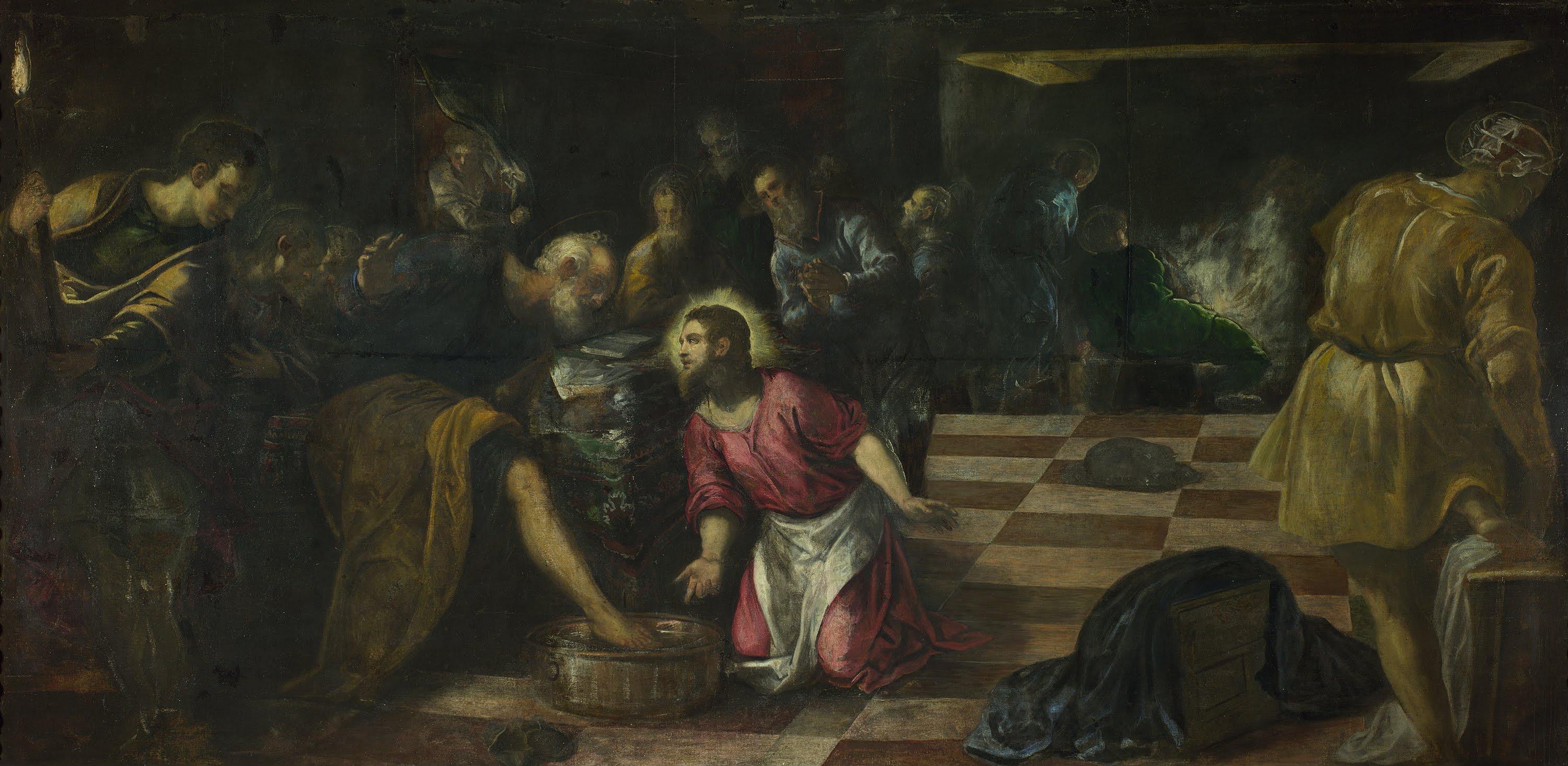
Jacopo Tintoretto, Christ Washing the Feet of The Disciples (1575-80)

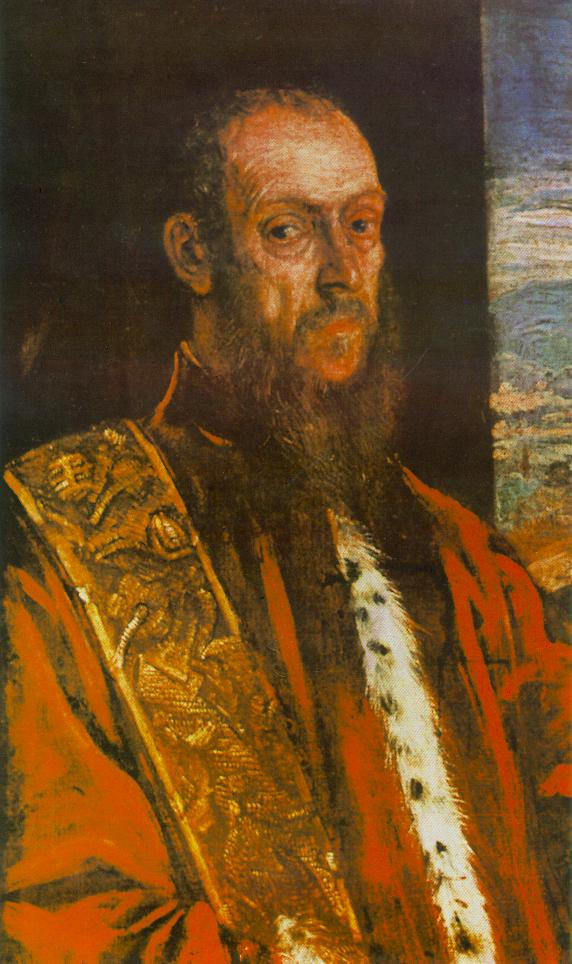
Jacopo Tintoretto, Portrait of Vincenzo Morosini (1575-80)

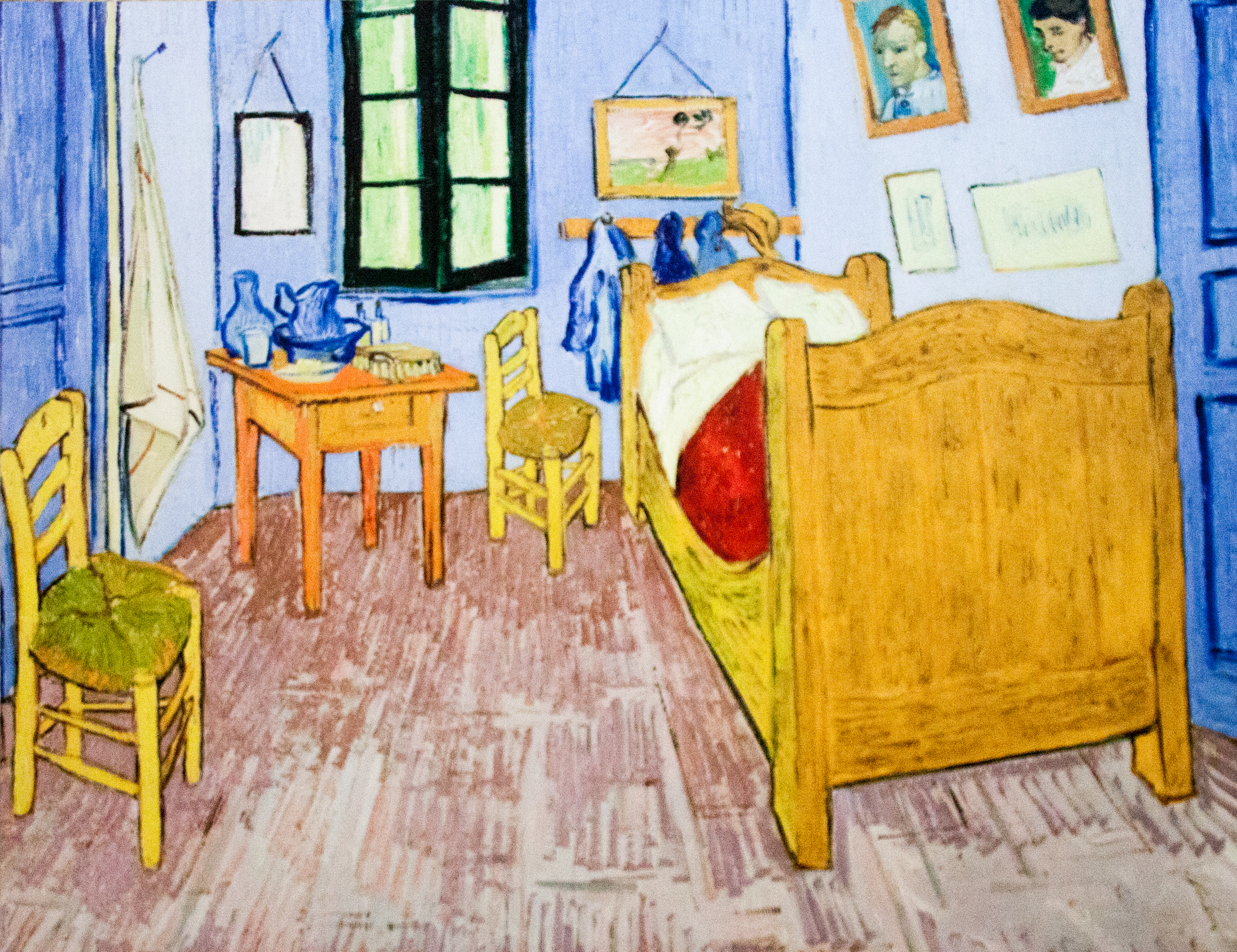
Vincent Van Gogh, Bedroom at Arles (1889)

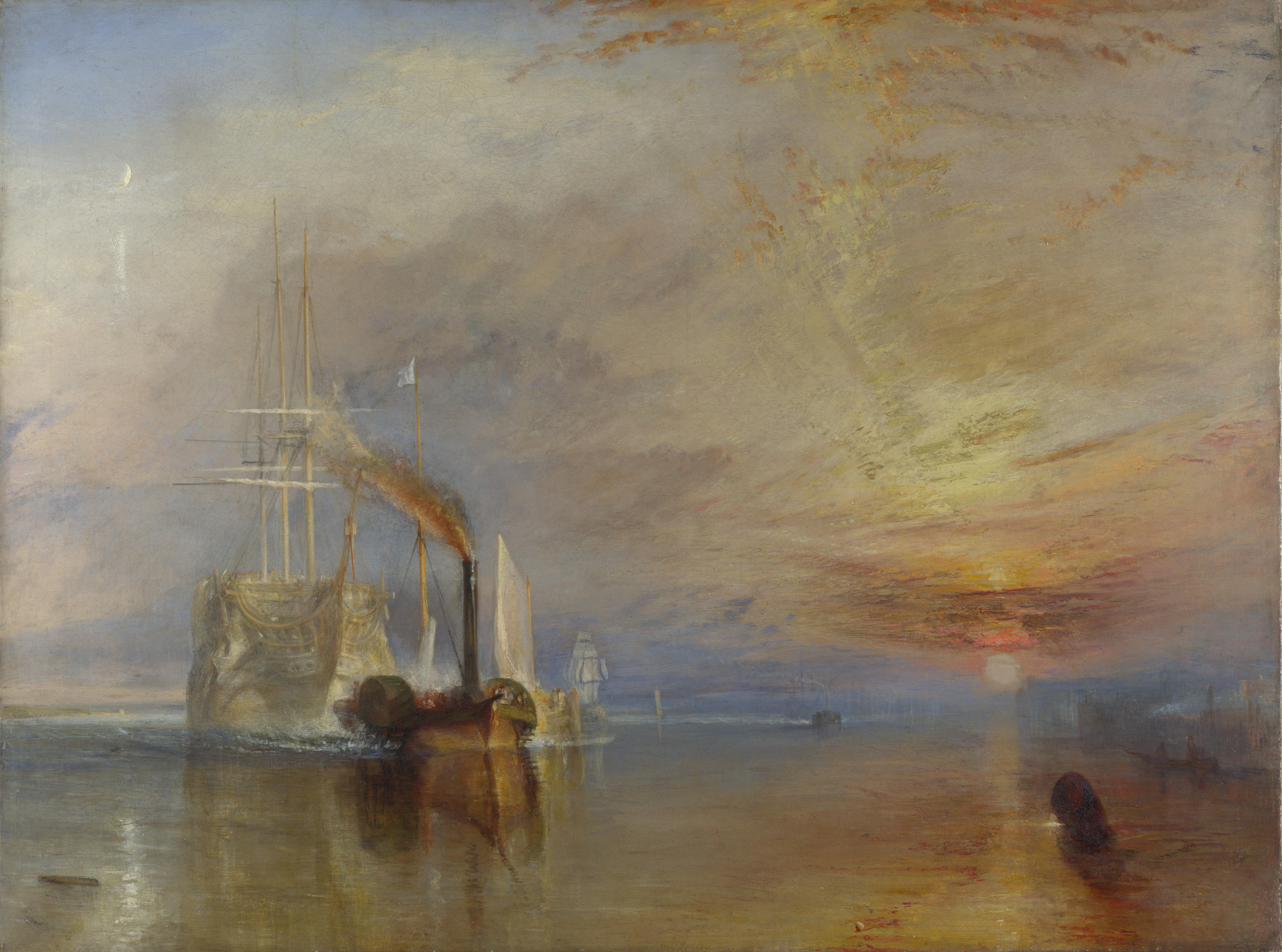
JMW Turner, The Fighting Temeraire (1839)

== Other uses ==
=== Cartography ===
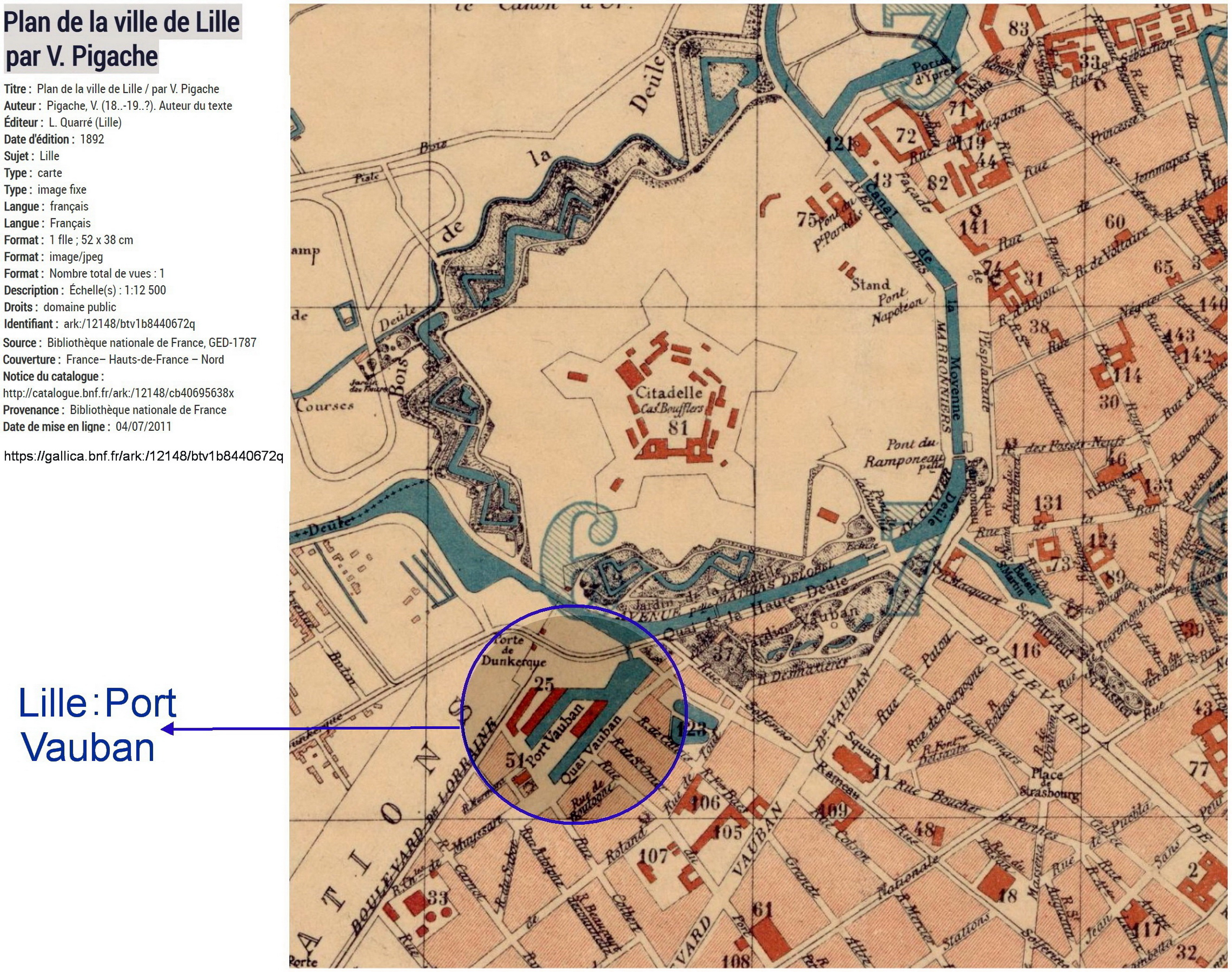
Sebastien Le Prestre de Vauban, Plan of Lille's Citadelle and harbour

Carmine red has been used in military cartography at least since the 17th century. Sébastien Le Prestre de Vauban, General Engineer of France, recommended the use of this red pigment to represent fortifications (ramparts, wood timbers, and brick buildings being reddish). This made buildings more distinct on maps

=== Cosmetics ===
Carmine is present in numerous cosmetics because of its red color. This use has continued from antiquity to the present. It can be found in lipstick, eye shadow, nail polish. It may cause allergies.

=== Histology ===
Carmine can be used in histology, as Best's carmine to stain glycogen, mucicarmine to stain acidic mucopolysaccharides, and carmalum to stain cell nuclei. In these applications, it is applied together with a mordant, usually an Al(III) salt.

=== Medicine ===
Cochineal, the insect used to make carmine, also has medical properties that were exploited by the Aztecs. It is said to help cure wounds when mixed with vinegar and applied to lesions. Aztecs used it to clean teeth.

=== Regulations for use in foods ===
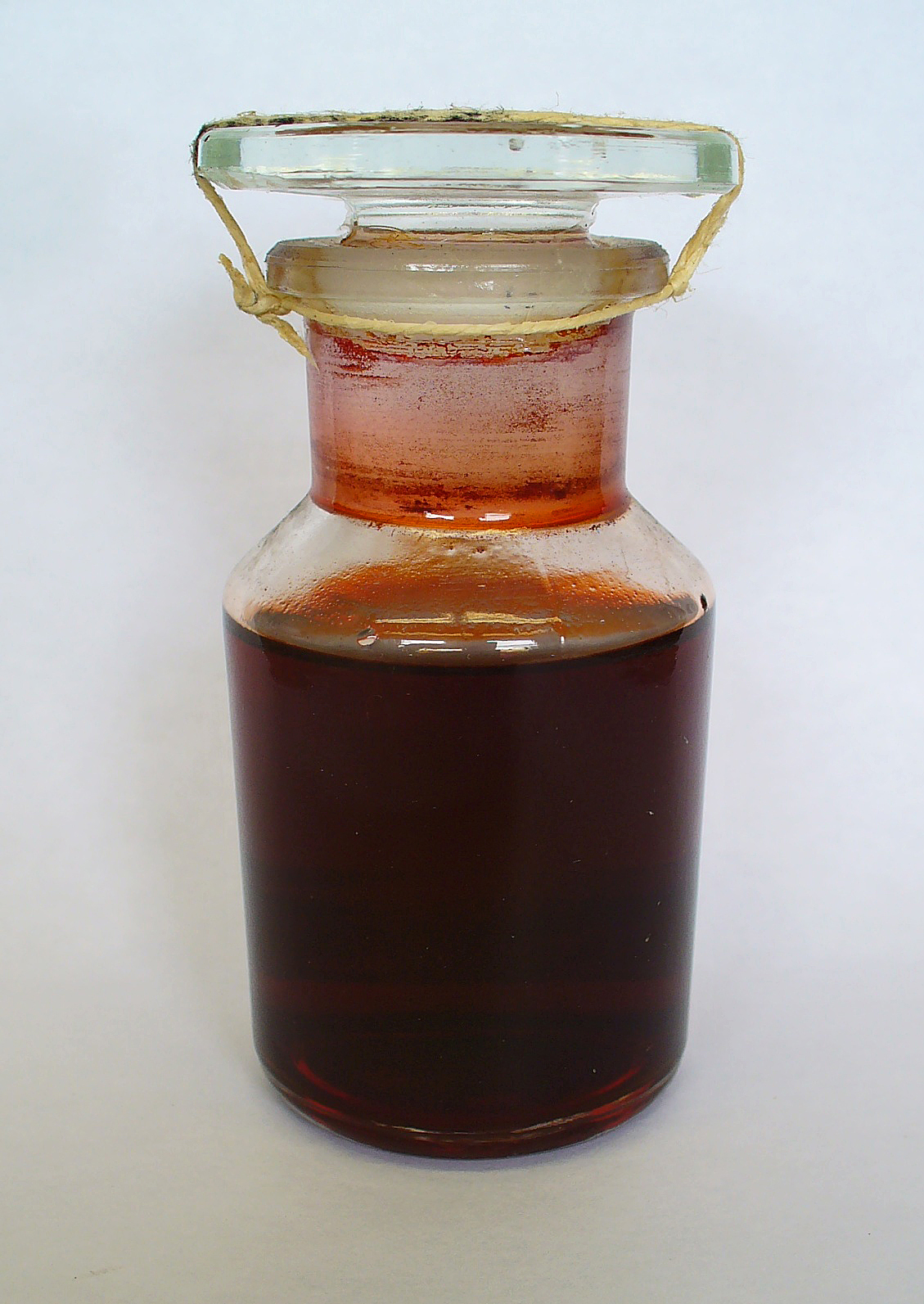
Extract of carmine was used from the Middle Ages until the 19th century to make crimson dye. Now it is used as a coloring for yogurt and other food products.

==== United States ====
In January 2006, the United States Food and Drug Administration (FDA) evaluated a proposal that would require food products containing carmine to list it by name on the ingredient label. It was also announced that the FDA will separately review the ingredient labels of prescription drugs that contain colorings derived from carmine. A request from the Center for Science in the Public Interest urging the FDA to require ingredient labels to explicitly state that carmine is derived from insects and may cause severe allergic reactions and anaphylactic shock was declined by the FDA. Food industries were aggressively opposed to the idea of writing "insect-based" on the label, and the FDA agreed to allow "cochineal extract" or "carmine".

==== European Union ====
In the European Union (EU), the use of carmine in foods is regulated under the European Commission's directives governing food additives in general and food dyes in particular and listed under the names Cochineal, Carminic acid, Carmines and Natural Red 4 as additive E 120 in the list of EU-approved food additives. The directive governing food dyes approves the use of carmine for certain groups of foods only and specifies a maximum amount which is permitted or restricts it to the quantum satis.

The EU-Directive 2000/13/EC on food labeling mandates that carmines (like all food additives) must be included in the list of ingredients of a food product with its additive category and listed name or additive number, that is either as Food colour carmines or as Food colour E 120 in the local language(s) of the market(s) the product is sold in.

As of January 2012, the European Food Safety Authority (EFSA) has changed the way they allow use of Carmine E120 for pharmaceutical products. EFSA had raised concerns over the increasing number of allergic reactions to carmine derived from insects (E120.360), when used within the British Pharmacopoeia. Pharmaceutical products which had previously contained insect-derived carmine, have been replaced with a synthesized version of the food colorant. Internal studies have shown that the new formulations of popular anti-nausea and weight-gain liquid medication had a significantly lower risk in terms of allergic reactions. The new formulation is known to be of plant origin, using calcium oxide to gauge color depth.

== See also ==
- Red pigments
- Kermesic acid

== Sources ==
- Padilla, Carmella; Anderson, Barbara Christine, eds. (2015). A Red Like No Other: How Cochineal Colored the World : an Epic Story of Art, Culture, Science, and Trade. Skira/Rizzoli. ISBN 978-0-8478-4643-6.
- Schweppe, Helmut; Roosen-Runge, Heinz (1986). "Carmine—Cochineal Carmine and Kermes Carmine". In Feller, Robert L. (ed.). Artists' Pigments: A Handbook of Their History and Characteristics (PDF). Vol. 1. National Gallery of Art. pp. 255–283. ISBN 978-0-521-30374-3.

Attribution
