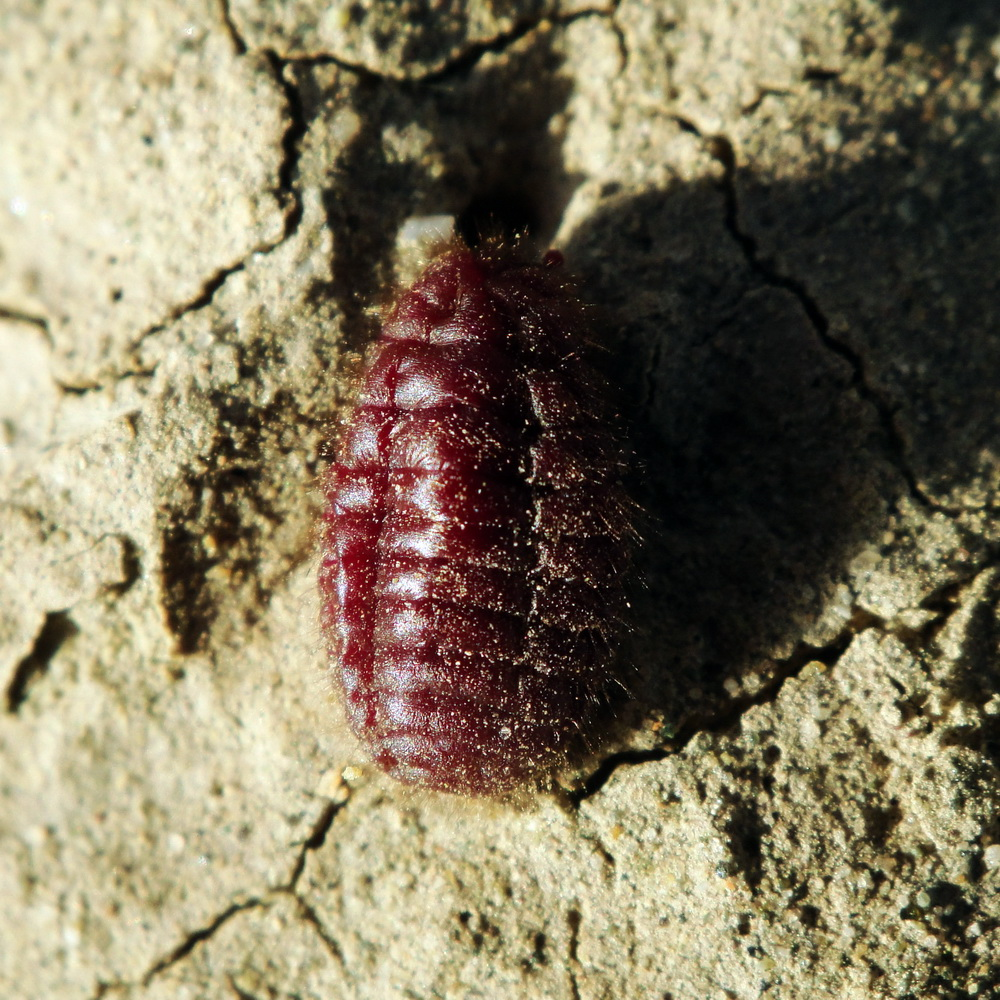
- Porphyrophora hamelii (female)
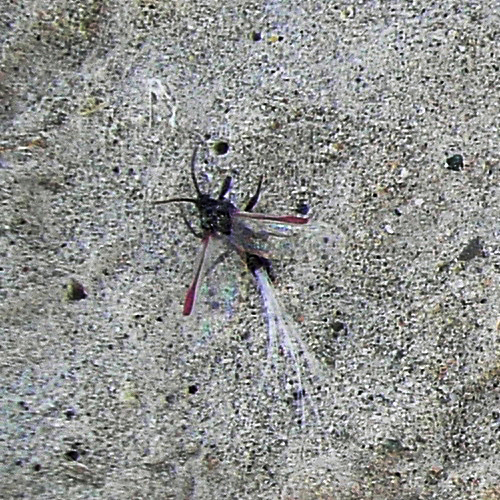
- Porphyrophora hamelii (male)

Scientific classification
- Kingdom: Animalia
- Phylum: Arthropoda
- Clade: Pancrustacea
- Class: Insecta
- Order: Hemiptera
- Suborder: Sternorrhyncha
- Family: Margarodidae
- Genus: Porphyrophora
- Species: P. hamelii

Binomial name
- Porphyrophora hamelii Brandt, 1833

Synonyms
- Porphyrophora hameli Brandt, 1834 (revived by Jakubski, 1965); Porphyrophora armeniaca Burmeister, 1835; Coccus radicis Meyer, 1856; Margarodes hameli Cockerell, 1902 and Fernald, 1903; Coccionella armeniaca Lindinger, 1954; Coccionella hamelii Lindinger, 1954; Coccionella hameli Lindinger, 1954

= Armenian cochineal =

Species of true bug

The Armenian cochineal (Porphyrophora hamelii), also known as the Ararat cochineal or Ararat scale, is a scale insect indigenous to the Ararat plain and Aras (Araks) River valley in the Armenian Highlands, including eastern Turkey. It was historically used to produce an eponymous crimson carmine dyestuff known in Armenia as vordan karmir (Armenian: որդան կարմիր, literally "worm's red") and in Persia as kirmiz. The species is critically endangered within Armenia.

P. hamelii is in a different taxonomic family from the cochineal found in the Americas. Both insects produce red dyestuffs that are also commonly called cochineal.

== History and art ==
P. hamelii is one of the ancient natural sources of red dye in the Middle East and Europe, along with the insect dyes kermes (from Kermes vermilio and related species), lac (from Kerria lacca and related species), and carmine from other Porphyrophora species such as the Polish cochineal (P. polonica), and the plant dye madder (from Rubia tinctorum and related species). It is possible that Armenian cochineal dye was in use as early as 714 BC, when the Neo-Assyrian king Sargon II was recorded as seizing red textiles as spoils of war from the kingdoms of Urartu (the geographic predecessor of Armenia) and Kilhu. The Roman-era physician and pharmacologist Dioscorides, writing in the 1st century AD, noted that the best kokkos baphike, the kermes shrub and its "grain" (kermes insect) that some ancient writers likely confused with P. hamelii, came from Galatia and Armenia. In the Early Middle Ages the Armenian historians Ghazar Parpetsi and Movses Khorenatsi wrote specifically of a worm-produced dyestuff from the Ararat region.

During the Middle Ages the Armenian cochineal dyestuff vordan karmir, also known in Persia as kirmiz, was widely celebrated in the Near East. Kirmiz is not to be confused with dyer's kermes, which was derived from another insect. The Armenian cities Artashat and Dvin were early centers of the production of kirmiz: during the 8th through 10th centuries Arab and Persian historians even referred to Artashat as "the town of kirmiz". The Arabs and Persians regarded kirmiz as one of the most valuable commodities exported from Armenia. The Armenians themselves used vordan karmir to produce dyes for textiles (including oriental rugs) and pigments for illuminated manuscripts and church frescos. Chemical analyses have identified the dye of Porphyrophora hamelii in Coptic textiles of the 3rd through 10th centuries, a cashmere cloth used in a kaftan from Sassanid Persia in the 6th or 7th century, silk liturgical gloves from 15th-century France, Ottoman fabrics such as velvets and lampas of the 15th through 17th centuries, and a 16th-century velvet cap of maintenance that belonged to Henry VIII of England.

At the time of the Renaissance in Europe, Porphyrophora insects were so valuable that in Constantinople during the 1430s, one kilogram (2.2 pounds) of Porphyrophora hamelii insects was worth more than 5 grams (0.18 ounces) of gold. The crimson Porphyrophora-based dyes were especially prized in Europe for dyeing silk, as the scarlet dye kermes was more plentiful, cheaper, and more effective for dyeing woolen textiles, which are heavier than silk and require more dye. It has been estimated that on the order of a half million dried P. hamelii insects were required to dye one kilogram (2.2 lb) of silk crimson during this period. On the comparison between Armenian and Polish cochineal, the author of a 15th-century treatise on silks in Florence wrote that "two pounds of the large [Armenian cochineal insects] will dye as much [silk] as one pound of small [Polish cochineal insects]; it is true that it gives a more noble and brighter colour than the small, but it gives less dye."

Around the end of the 16th century the Old World Porphyrophora dyes were supplanted by dyes of the Dactylopius coccus cochineal species from the Americas, which could be harvested several times per year and yielded a much more concentrated dye.

The carmine dyestuff of Porphyrophora hamelii owes its red color almost entirely to carminic acid, making it difficult to distinguish chemically from the dyestuff of cochineal from the Americas. The dyestuff of Porphyrophora polonica can be distinguished by its small admixture of kermesic acid, which is the major constituent of kermes from Kermes vermilio.

In 1833 the German naturalist Johann Friedrich von Brandt suggested the scientific name Porphyrophora hamelii after the Russian physician, traveler, and historian of German descent Iosif Khristianovich Gamel (Josef Hamel) (ru), who visited the Ararat plain in the early 1830s and wrote a report about the "cochineal" insects living there.

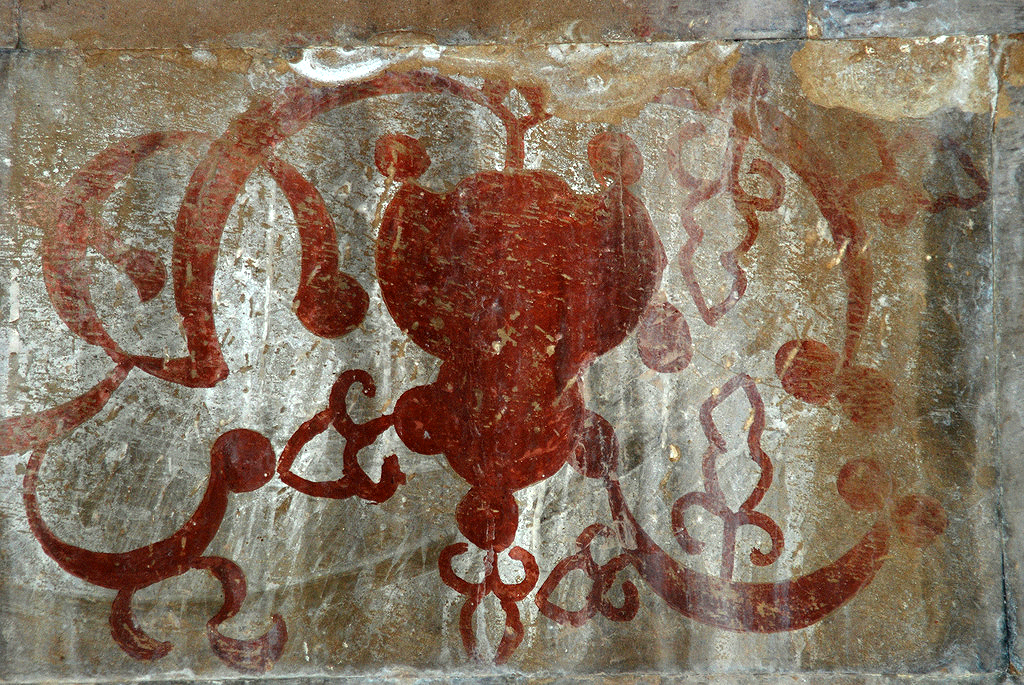
Vordan karmir ceiling art at Noravank Monastery

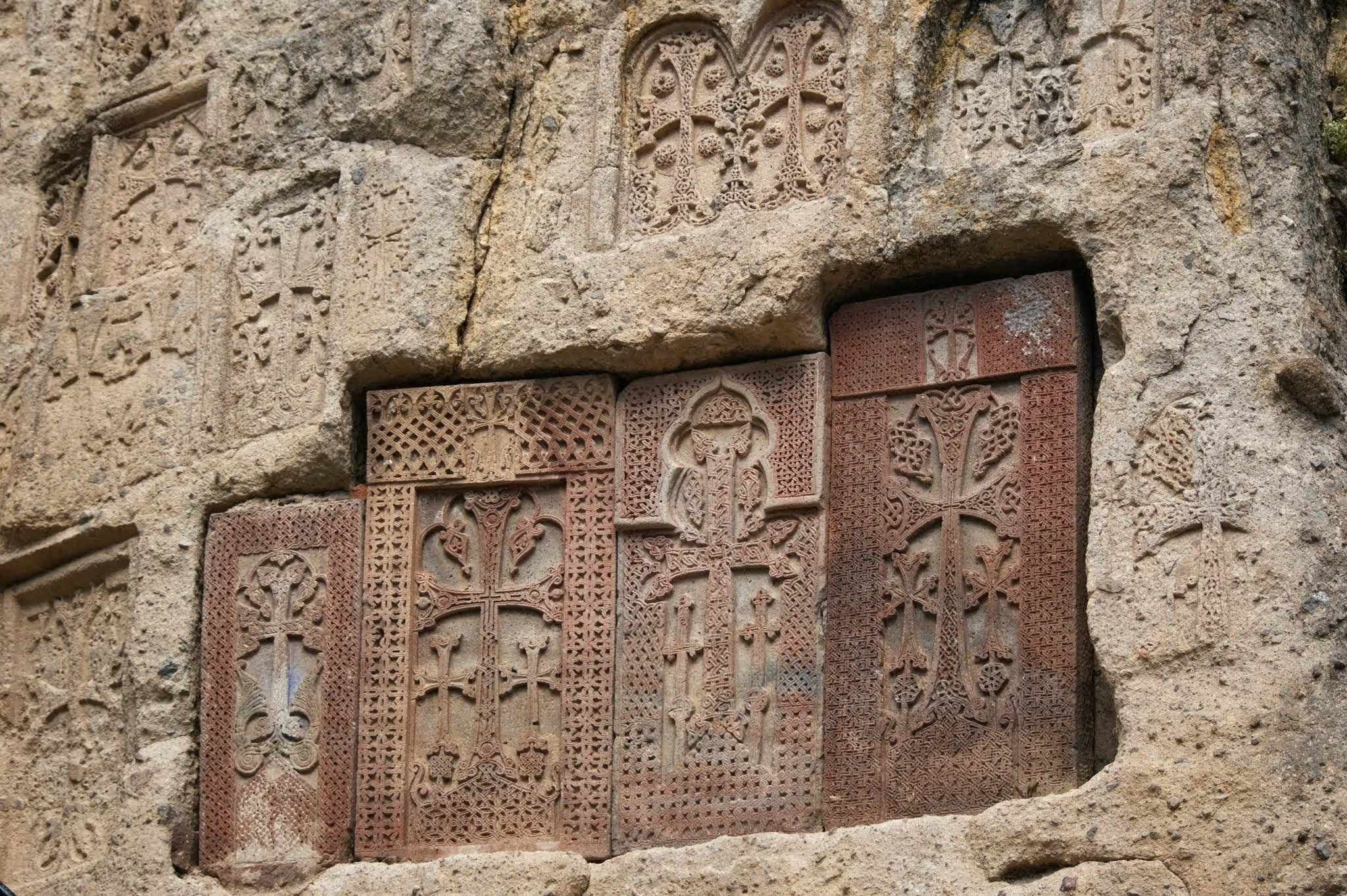
Khachkars (cross-stones) at Geghard Monastery painted with vordan karmir

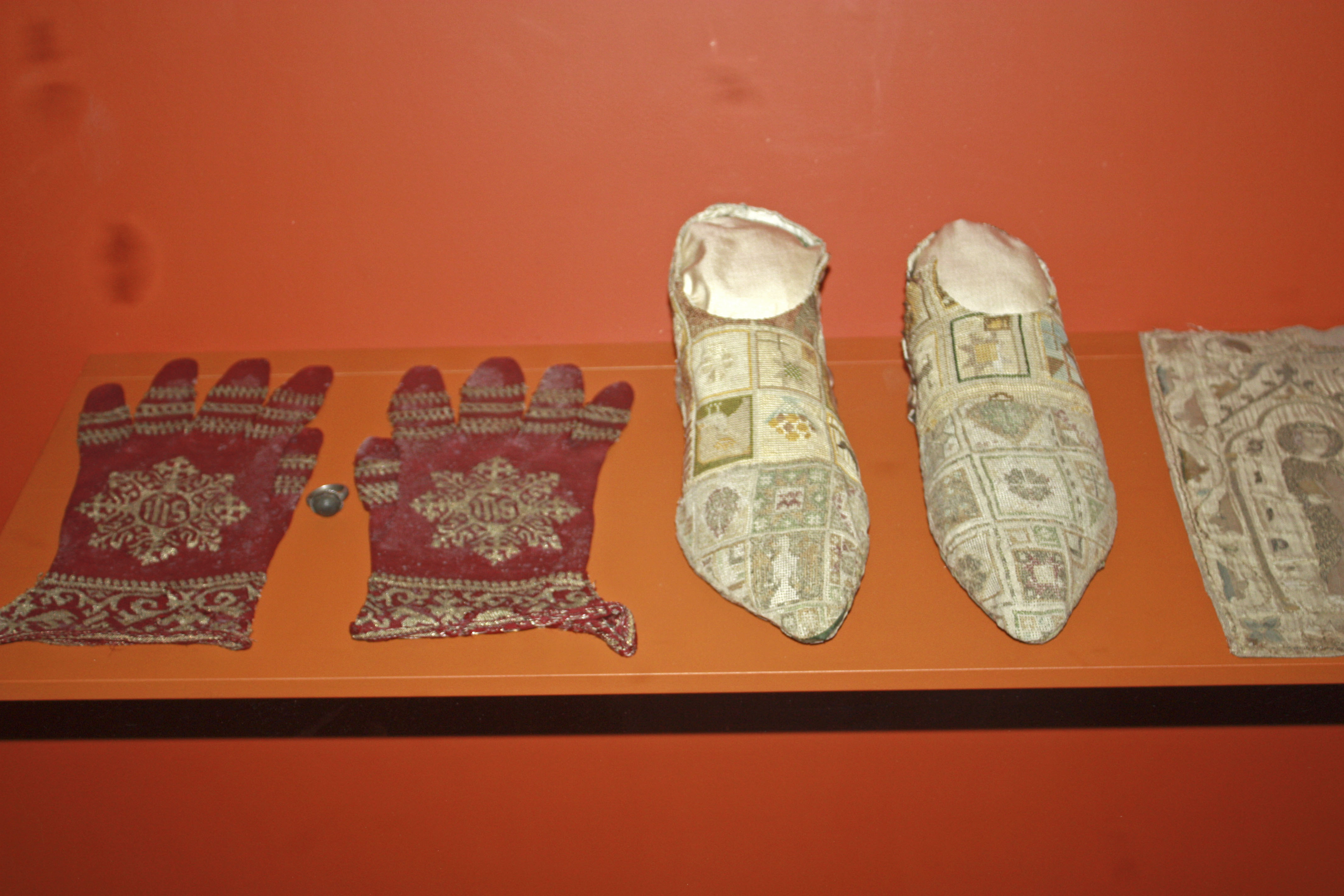
Silk liturgical gloves (left) of Cardinal Pierre de Foix (15th century), dyed crimson with P. hamelii carmine

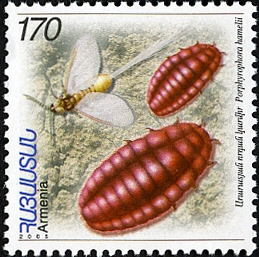
A 2006 Armenian postage stamp depicting P. hamelii

== Biology ==
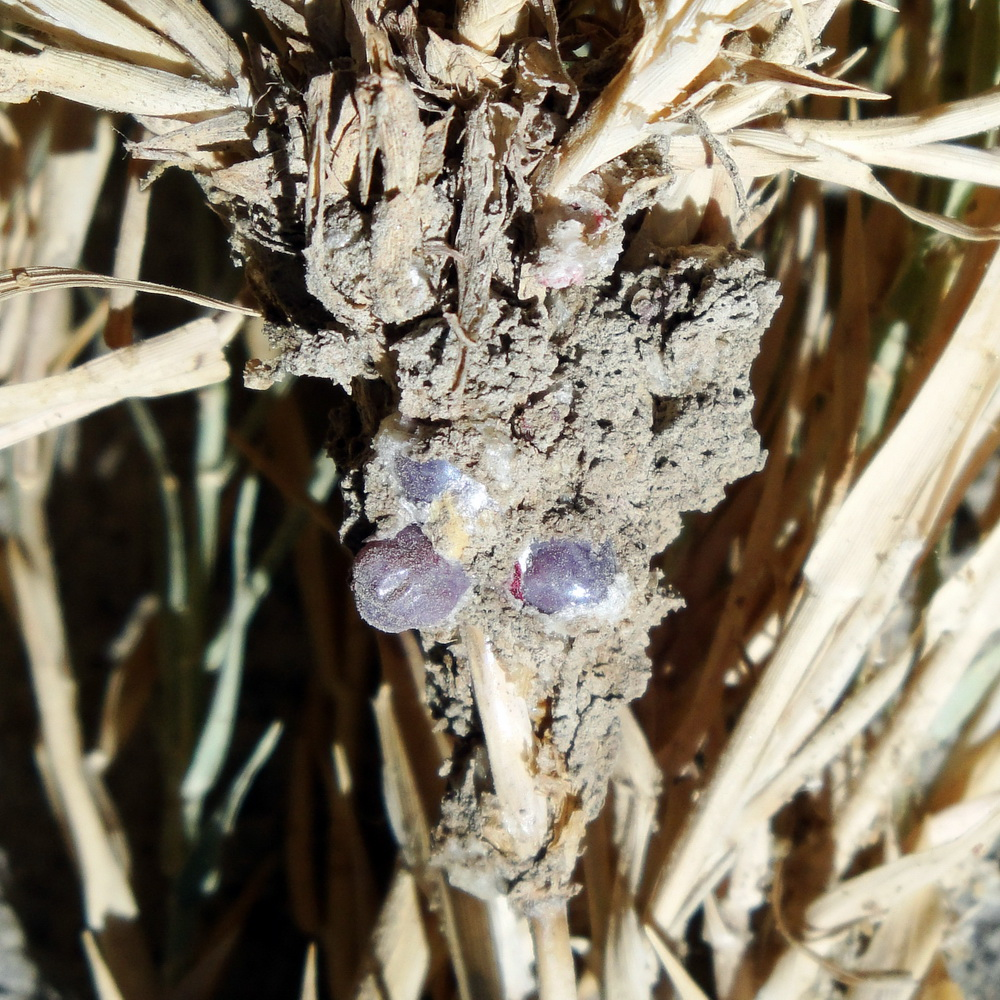
Porphyrophora hamelii cysts around the root of Aeluropus littoralis

Porphyrophora hamelii is a sexually dimorphic species. The adult female, from which carmine is extracted, is oval-shaped, soft-bodied, crimson in color, and has large forelegs for digging. The females can be quite large for a Porphyrophora species: up to 10–12 mm (0.39–0.47 in) long and 7 mm (0.28 in) wide. It has been noted that one troy pound (360 grams) of cochineal insects requires 18,000–23,000 specimens of Porphyrophora hamelii, but 100,000–130,000 specimens of the sister species Porphyrophora polonica (or 20,000–25,000 specimens of Dactylopius coccus). The adult male P. hamelii is a winged insect.

The life cycle of Porphyrophora hamelii is mostly subterranean. Newly hatched nymphs emerge from the ground in the springtime and crawl until they find the roots of certain grassy plants that grow in saline soil, such as Aeluropus littoralis (Armenian: որդանխոտ (genus Aeluropus), literally "worm's grass") and the common reed Phragmites australis. The nymphs continue to feed on these roots throughout the spring and summer, forming protective pearl-like cysts in the process. From mid-September to mid-October adults emerge from the ground between 5 a.m. and 10 a.m. to mate. The adult insects, lacking mouthparts, do not feed. Adult males live for only a few days, but adult females can live longer, burrowing into the ground to lay their eggs.

== Habitat and conservation ==
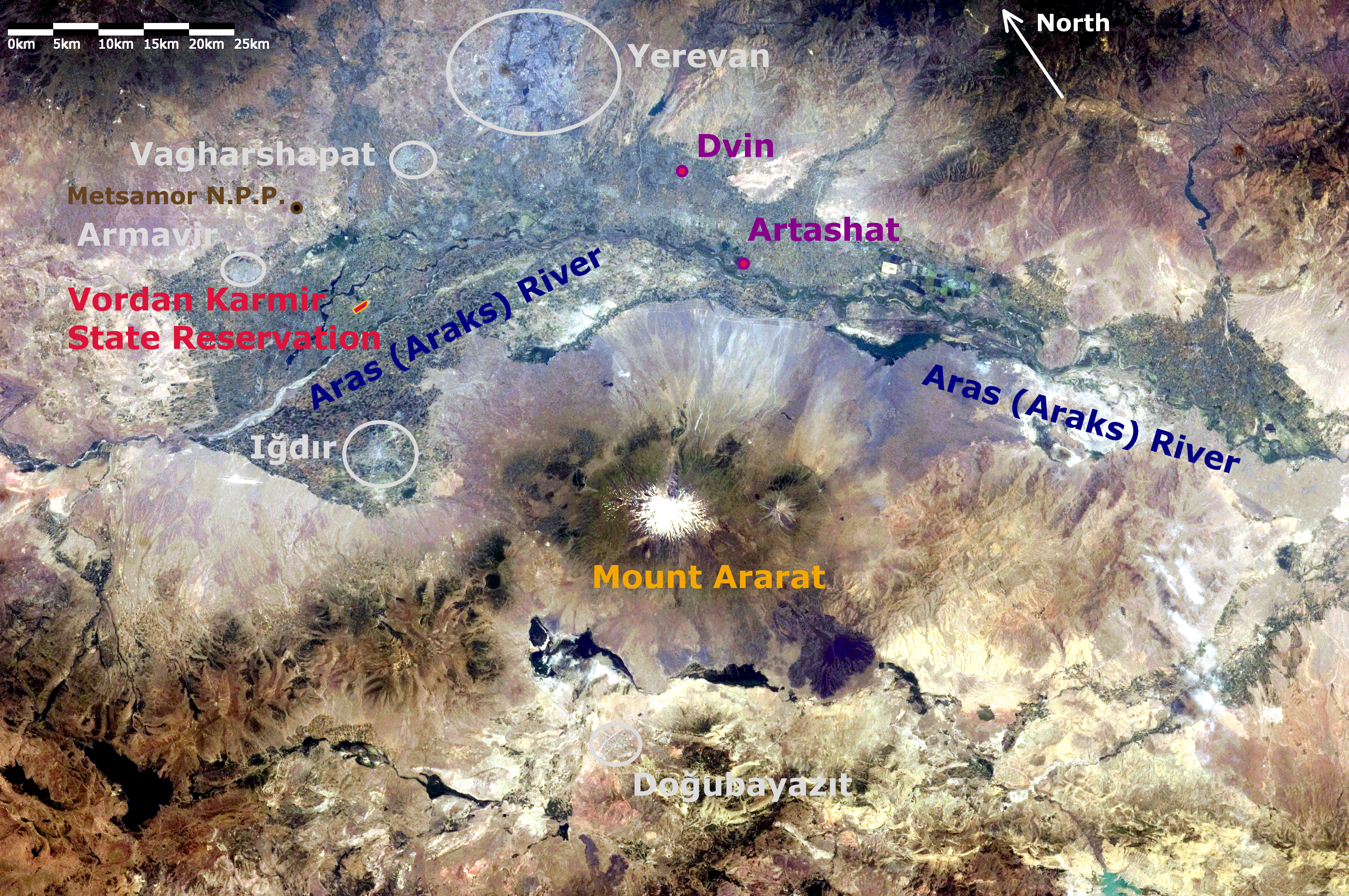
The historic habitat of Porphyrophora hamelii. Vordan Karmir State Reservation is in red and the historic dye-producing cities Artashat and Dvin are in purple.

The red dye-producing insects of the Ararat plain were once plentiful: a 19th-century French traveler wrote that shepherds' flocks, when led to drink from the Araxes (Araks) River, would appear bloody from the insects. In the mid-20th century the extent of occurrence in Armenia was 100 km^{2} (39 sq mi) with a recorded distribution that included the Ararat and Armavir provinces in Armenia as well as the Turkish, Iranian, and Russian Caucasus, but by the 1990s the extent of occurrence in Armenia had shrunk to about 20 km^{2} (7.7 sq mi), mostly in Armavir Province. During the Soviet period, desalination of the Armenian salt marshes to create "economic and agricultural regions", and the creation of lakes for fisheries, "severely restricted the [habitable] area for the insects and [endangered their] existence."

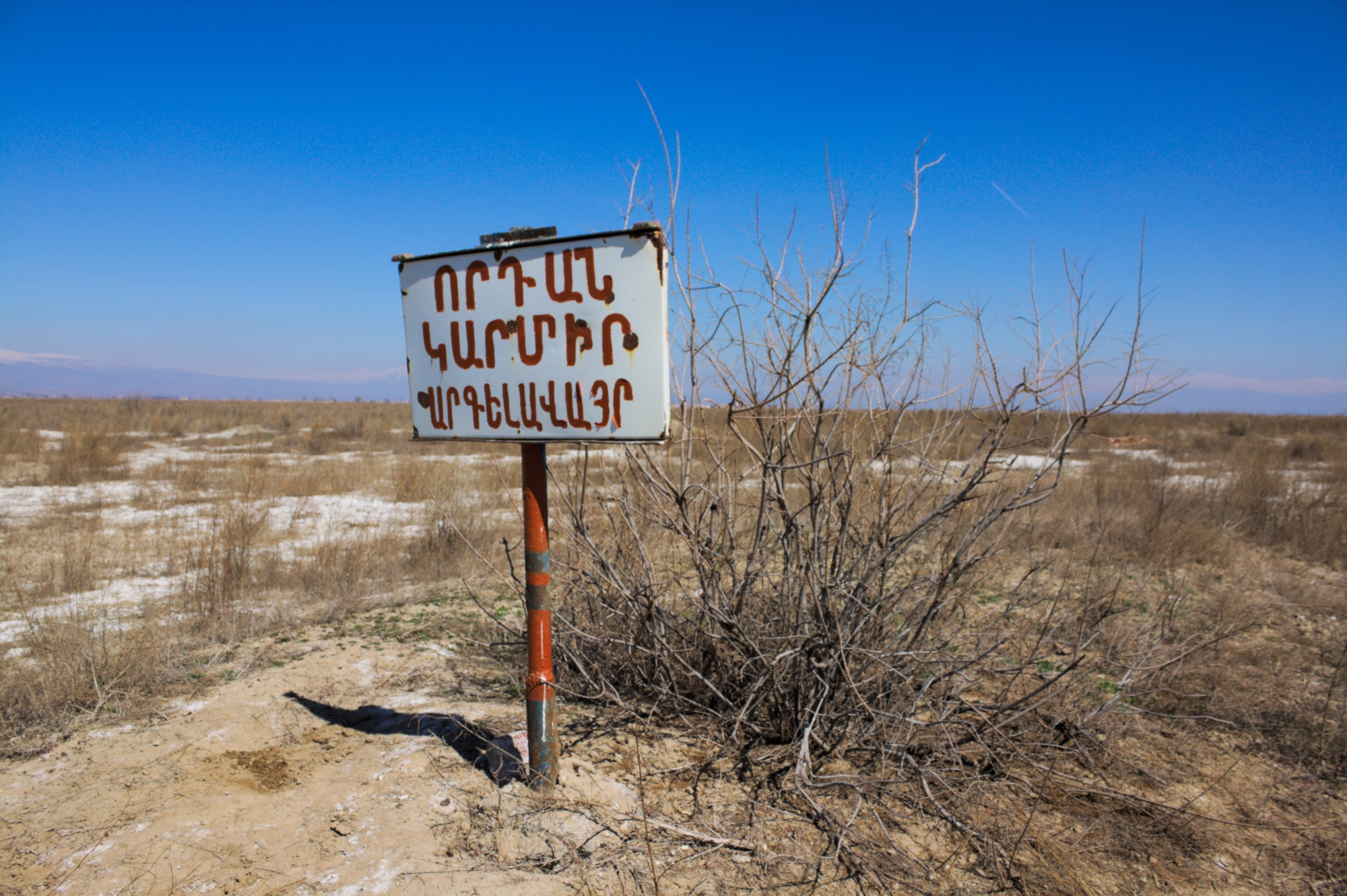
Vordan Karmir State Reservation, Armenia

The population in Armenia resides almost entirely in the Vordan Karmir State Reservation, a salt meadow habitat of 198.33 ha (490.1 acres) northwest of Arazap village and 21.52 ha (53.2 acres) in the north of Jrarat village established in 1987 near the Araks River border with Turkey, plus a site southeast of Ararat village and a few patches of several hectares elsewhere. There have been no recent scientific reports on populations of Porphyrophora hamelii outside the surroundings of Mount Ararat.

Porphyrophora hamelii is considered critically endangered within Armenia by meeting the following conditions: an area of occupancy of less than 10 km^{2} (3.9 sq mi), plus severely fragmented occupancy or known to exist at only a single location, plus continued decline (observed, inferred, or projected) in the area of occurrence, area of occupancy, and area, extent, and/or quality of habitat; and an extent of occurrence of less than 100 km^{2} (39 sq mi) with the aforementioned conditions of continued decline.

Threats to the Porphyrophora hamelii population in Armenia include the development of saline lands, agricultural improvements, uncontrolled livestock grazing, and possibly climate change. Natural foes of the species include mold mites, lady beetles, harvester ants, and erratic ants.

== See also ==
- Polish cochineal
- genus Porphyrophora of Armenian cochineal and Polish cochineal species
- Mexican Cochineal
