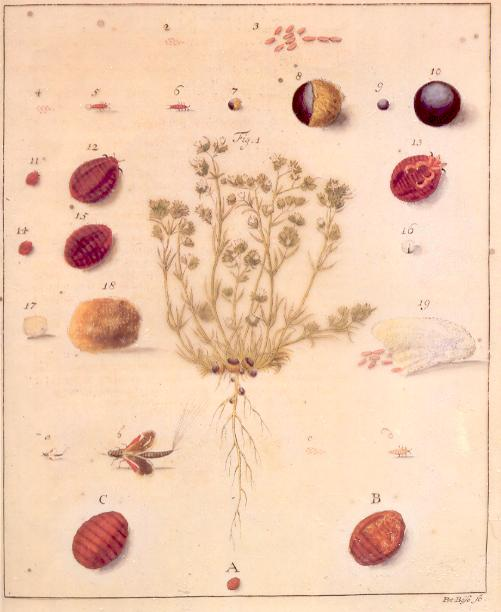
- Life cycle of the Polish cochineal in Breyne's Historia naturalis Cocci Radicum... (1731)

Scientific classification
- Kingdom: Animalia
- Phylum: Arthropoda
- Class: Insecta
- Order: Hemiptera
- Suborder: Sternorrhyncha
- Family: Margarodidae
- Genus: Porphyrophora
- Species: P. polonica

Binomial name
- Porphyrophora polonica (Linnaeus, 1758)
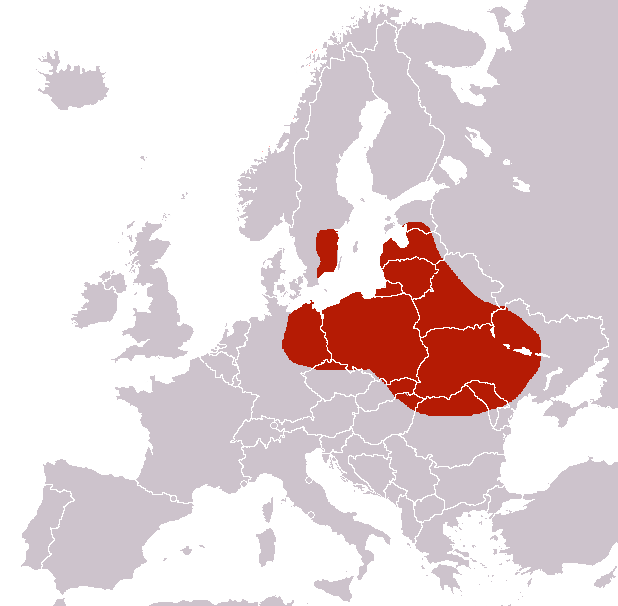
- Area where the Polish cochineal was found in commercial quantities

Synonyms
- Coccus polonicus Linnaeus, 1758; Coccus radicum Beckmann, 1790; Coccionella polonica Hahnemann, 1793; Porphyrophora frischii Brandt, 1835; Porphyrophora fritchii Signoret, 1869; Margarodes polonicus Cockerell, 1902

= Polish cochineal =

Species of true bug

Polish cochineal (Porphyrophora polonica, Margarodes polonicus), also known as Polish carmine scales (Polish: czerwiec polski), is a scale insect formerly used to produce a crimson dye of the same name, colloquially known as "Saint John's blood". The larvae of P. polonica are sessile parasites living on the roots of various herbs – especially those of the perennial knawel (Polish: czerwiec trwały) – growing on the sandy soils of Central Europe and other parts of Eurasia. Before the development of aniline, alizarin, and other synthetic dyes, the insect was of great economic importance, although in the 16th century, its use was in decline after the introduction of cheaper dyes imported from the Americas during the period of great discoveries of the New World by the Spanish and Portuguese explorers and conquistadores. In Europe before the 16 th century, the dye extract from Polish cochineal was one of the main Poland’s export products in antiquity and the Middle Ages until the 16 century when the period of Spanish and Portuguese explorations of the New World, from which the cheaper dyes from Southern America were being imported to Europe. Dye extract from Polish cochineal was one of the main Polish export products in antiquity and the Middle Ages and red dyes were historically associated with Poland. White and red are traditional and historical national colours of Poland, Polish royal banners and the Flag of Poland.

== Biology ==
=== Life cycle ===
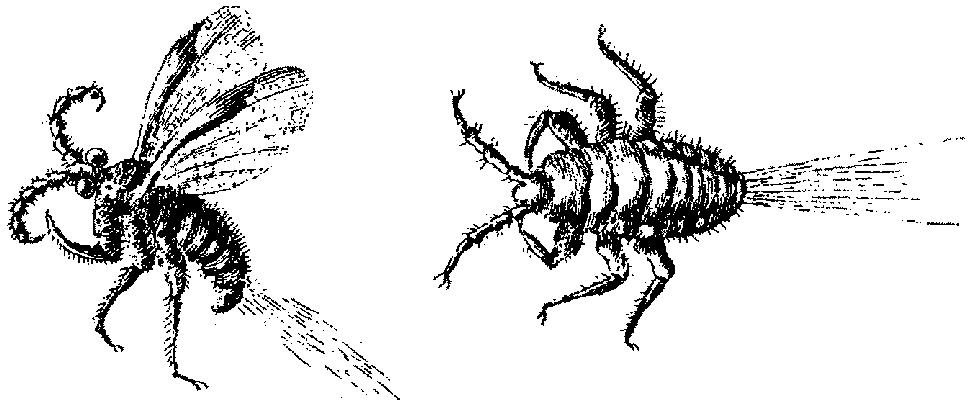
Adult Polish cochineal, male (left) and female; from Wolfe (1766)

In mid-July, the female Polish cochineal lays approximately 600-700 eggs, encased with a white waxy ootheca, in the ground. When the larvae hatch in late August or early September, they do not leave the egg case but remain inside until the end of winter. In late March or early April, the larvae emerge from the ground to feed for a short time on the low-growing leaves of the host plant before returning underground to feed on the plant's roots. At this point, the larvae undergo ecdysis, shedding their exoskeletons together with their legs and antennae, and they encyst by forming outer protective coatings (cysts) within the root tissues.

The cysts are small dark red or violet bubbles clustered on the host plant's roots. Female cysts are 3–4 millimetres (0.12–0.16 in) in diameter. Males are half the size of their female counterparts and fewer in number, with only one male per 500 females. The cysts undergo ecdysis a number of times. When the male larva reaches the third-instar developmental stage, it forms a delicate white cocoon and transforms into a pupa in early June. In late June or early July, females, which are neotenous and retain their larval form, re-emerge from the ground and slowly climb to the top of the host plant, where they wait until winged adult males, with characteristic plumes at the end of their abdomens, leave the cocoons and join them a few days later. Male imagines (adult insects) do not feed and die shortly after mating, while their female counterparts return underground to lay eggs. After oviposition, the female insects shrink and die.

=== Host plants and geographic distribution ===
The Polish cochineal lives on herbaceous plants growing in sandy and arid, infertile soils. Its primary host plant is the perennial knawel (Scleranthus perennis), but it has also been known to feed on plants of 20 other genera, including mouse-ear hawkweed (Hieracium pilosella), bladder campion (Silene inflata), velvet bent (Agrostis canina), Caragana, smooth rupturewort (Herniaria glabra), strawberry (Fragaria), and cinquefoil (Potentilla).

The insect was once commonly found throughout the Palearctic and was recognised across Eurasia, from France and England to China, but it was mainly in Central Europe where it was common enough to make its industrial use economically viable. Excessive economic exploitation as well as the shrinking and degradation of its habitat have made the Polish cochineal a rare species. In 1994, it was included in the Ukrainian Red Book of endangered species. In Poland, where it was still common in the 1960s, there is insufficient data to determine its conservation status, and no protective measures are in place.

== History ==
Ancient Slavs developed a method of obtaining red dye from the larvae of the Polish cochineal. Despite the labor-intensive process of harvesting the cochineal and a relatively modest yield, the dye continued to be a highly sought-after commodity and a popular alternative to kermes throughout the Middle Ages until the age of discoveries of the New World, from where the Spanish and Portuguese explorers and conquistadors brought cheaper dyes from Southern America.

=== Dye production ===
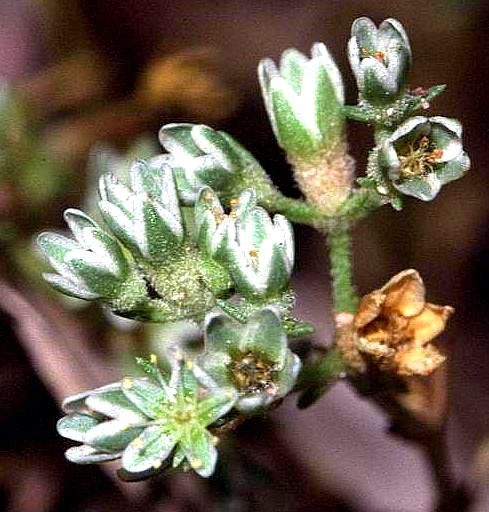
Perennial knawel, the chief host plant of the Polish cochineal

Similar to some other red dyes obtained from scale insects, the red coloring is derived from carminic acid with traces of kermesic acid. The Polish cochineal carminic acid content is approximately 0.6% of the insect's dried body weight. The insects were harvested shortly before the female larvae reached maturity, i.e. in late June, usually around Saint John the Baptist's day (June 24), hence the dye's folk name, Saint John's blood. The harvesting process involved uprooting the host plant and picking the female larvae, averaging approximately ten insects from each plant. In Poland, including present-day Ukraine, and elsewhere in Europe, plantations were operated in order to deal with the high toll on the host plants. The larvae were killed with boiling water or vinegar and dried in the sun or in an oven, ground, and dissolved in sourdough or in light rye beer called kvass in order to remove fat. The extract could then be used for dyeing silk, wool, cotton, or linen. The dyeing process requires roughly 3-4 oz of dye per pound (180-250 g per kilogram) of silk and one pound of dye to color almost 20 pounds (50 g per kilogram) of wool.

=== Trade ===
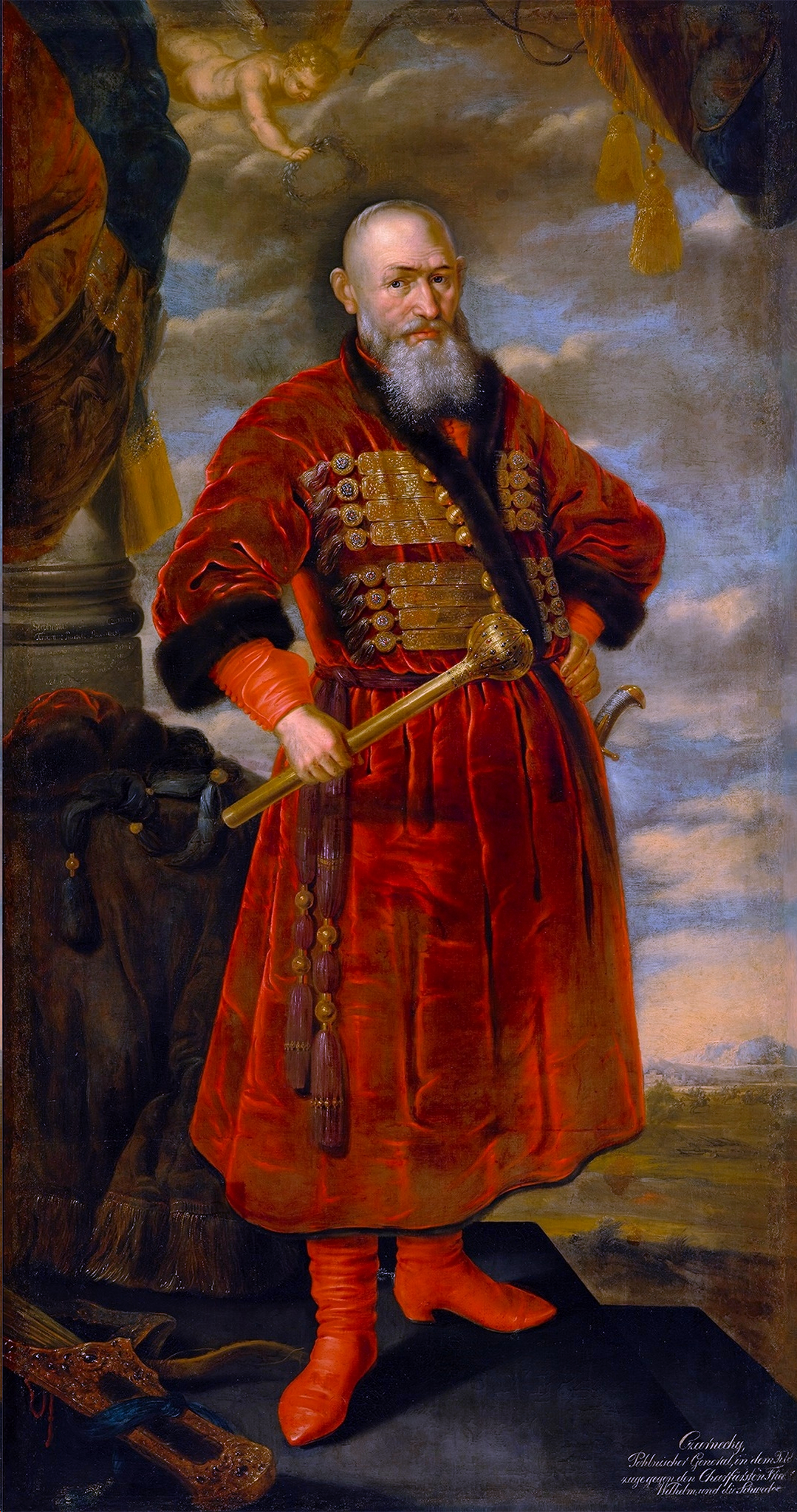
Polish military commander, Stefan Czarniecki (1599–1665), in a crimson costume typical of Polish magnates

Polish cochineal was widely traded in Europe during the Middle Ages and the Renaissance. In the 15th and 16th centuries, along with grain, timber, and salt, it was one of Poland's chief exports, mainly to southern Germany and northern Italy as well as to France, England, the Ottoman Empire, and Armenia. In Poland, the cochineal trade was mostly monopolized by Jewish merchants, who bought the dye from peasants in Red Ruthenia and other regions of Poland and Lithuania. The merchants shipped the dye to major Polish cities such as Kraków, Danzig (Gdańsk), and Poznań. From there, the merchandise was exported to wholesalers in Breslau (Wrocław), Nuremberg, Frankfurt, Augsburg, Venice, and other destinations. The Polish cochineal trade was a lucrative business for the intermediaries; according to Marcin of Urzędów (1595), one pound of Polish cochineal cost between four and five Venetian pounds. In terms of quantities, the trade reached its peak in the 1530s. In 1534, 1963 stones (about 30 metric tons) of the dye were sold in Poznań alone.

The advent of cheaper Mexican cochineal led to an abrupt slump in the Polish cochineal trade, and the 1540s saw a steep decline in quantities of the red dye exported from Poland. In 1547, Polish cochineal disappeared from the Poznań customs registry; a Volhynian clerk noted in 1566 that the dye no longer paid in Gdańsk. Perennial knawel plantations were replaced with cereal fields or pastures for raising cattle. Polish cochineal, which until then was mostly used by the rich nobles and the royals and as an export product, continued to be used locally by the peasants who collected it; it was employed not only for dyeing fabric but also as a vodka colorant, an ingredient in folk medicine, crafts or even for decorative coloring of horses' tails.

With the partitions of Poland at the end of the 18th century, vast markets in Russia and Central Asia opened to Polish cochineal, which became an export product again – this time, to the East. In the 19th century, Bukhara, Uzbekistan, became the principal Polish cochineal trading center in Central Asia; from there the dye was shipped to Kashgar in Xinjiang, and Kabul and Herat in Afghanistan. It is possible that the Polish dye was used to manufacture some of the famous oriental rugs.

=== Studies ===
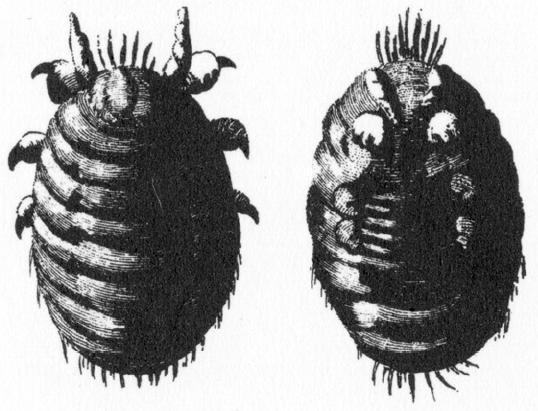
Female Polish cochineal; from Wolfe (1763)

The earliest known scientific study of the Polish cochineal is found in the Herbarz Polski (Polish Herbal) by Marcin of Urzędów (1595), where it was described as "small red seeds" that grow under plant roots, becoming "ripe" in April and from which a little "bug" emerges in June. The first scientific comments by non-Polish authors were written by Segerius (1670) and von Bernitz (1672). In 1731, Johann Philipp Breyne, wrote Historia naturalis Cocci Radicum Tinctorii quod polonicum vulgo audit (translated into English during the same century), the first major treatise about the insect, including the results of his research on its physiology and life cycle. In 1934, Polish biologist Antoni Jakubski wrote Czerwiec polski (Polish cochineal), a monograph taking into account both the insect's biology and historical role.

== Linguistics ==
The historical importance of the Polish cochineal is still reflected in most modern Slavic languages where the words for the color red and for the month of June both derive from the Proto-Slavic *čьrvь (probably pronounced [t͡ʃĭrwĭ]), meaning "a worm" or "larva". (See examples in the table below.)

In Czech, as well as old Bulgarian, this is true for both June and July, the two months when harvest of the insect's larvae was possible. In modern Polish, czerwiec is a word for June, as well as for the Polish cochineal (czerwiec polski) and its host plant, the perennial knawel (czerwiec trwały).

English	Belarusian	Ukrainian	Polish	Czech	Bulgarian
worm, larva	чарвяк charvyak	черв'як cherv'yak	czerw	červ	червей chervey
red (adj.)	чырвоны chyrvony	червоний chervonyy	czerwony czerwień	červený	червен cherven
June	чэрвень chervyen'	червень cherven'	czerwiec	červen	червеник chervenik
July				červenec	чръвенъ chraven
Polish cochineal	чэрвек chervyeк	червець chervets'	czerwiec polski		

== See also ==
- Armenian cochineal (Porphyrophora hamelii )
- Cochineal (Dactylopius coccus)
- Kermes vermilio
- Crimson (color)
