= Laccaic acid =

Laccaic acid A

Names
- IUPAC name 7-[5-(2-acetamidoethyl)-2-hydroxyphenyl]-3,5,6,8-tetrahydroxy-9,10-dioxoanthracene-1,2-dicarboxylic acid
- Other names Red lac, Shellac, Lac dye

Identifiers
CAS Number	15979-35-8
3D model (JSmol)	Interactive image
ChEBI	CHEBI:90186
ChemSpider	4590519
PubChem CID	5491415
- InChI: InChI=1S/C26H19NO12/c1-8(28)27-5-4-9-2-3-12(29)10(6-9)15-22(33)19-18(24(35)23(15)34)20(31)11-7-13(30)16(25(36)37)17(26(38)39)14(11)21(19)32/h2-3,6-7,29-30,33-35H,4-5H2,1H3,(H,27,28)(H,36,37)(H,38,39)
- SMILES: CC(=O)NCCC1=CC(=C(C=C1)O)C2=C(C3=C(C(=C2O)O)C(=O)C4=CC(=C(C(=C4C3=O)C(=O)O)C(=O)O)O)O

Properties
Chemical formula	C_{26}H_{19}NO_{12}
Molar mass	537.44 g·mol^{−1}
Density	1.7±0.1 g.cm^{3}
Vapor pressure	0.0±0.3 mmHg at 25°C
- Except where otherwise noted, data are given for materials in their standard state (at 25 °C [77 °F], 100 kPa). Infobox references

Laccaic acids or laccainic acids are a group of five anthraquinone derivatives, designated A through E, which are components of the red shellac obtained from the insect Kerria lacca, similar to carminic acid and kermesic acid. This article focuses primarily on laccaic acid A (LCA).

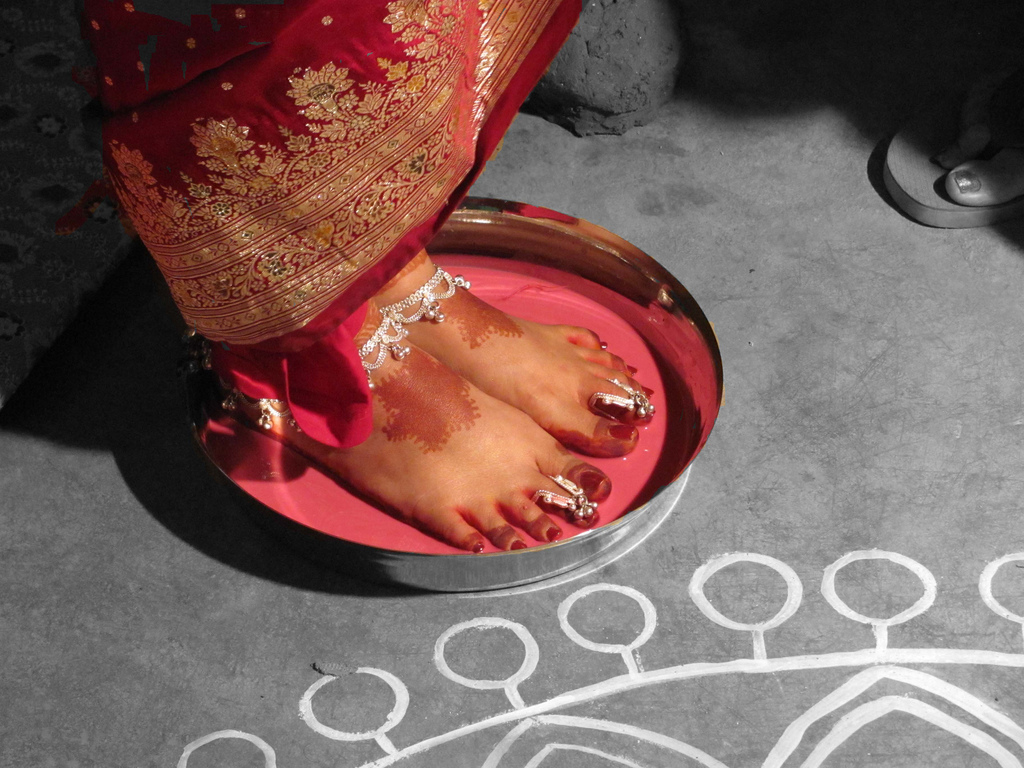
Mixture of milk and lac dye - A ceremony welcoming the newly wed bride to her new home

== History ==
=== Etymology ===
The word lacquer goes back to the old Indian Sanskrit word laksha, meaning a hundred thousand lice, and came into German via the Italian "lacca" in the 16th century. The word also exists in Hindi (Lakh) and Sinhala (Lakda). The term Lac Dye comes from English "dye" means paint dye. This pigment is mostly found in South and South-East Asia.

=== Usage ===
Laccaic acids are mainly used to dye natural fabrics (mostly silk, wool, or cotton) and food, including both drinks and solid products. It is one of the most common natural dyes, but it is less used in cosmetics than carmine, the main natural dye used in this industry. The bright red colorant gives a lightfast tint to silk and wool. It is a similar color to dyes obtained from cochineals and kermes. The color of the dye can be modified by the choice of mordant from violet to red to brown. The use of lac dye can be traced back to 250 AD when it was mentioned by Claudius Aelianus, a Roman writer on a volume about natural history. This pigment made from lac dye, Indian Lake, was listed by Winsor & Newton in their 1896 catalogue.

=== Derivatives ===
These derivatives differ through one ramification except for the acid D, which is closer in form to the kermesic acid. Acid laccaic D can be confused or interchanged with flavokermisic acid due to their almost identical structure. These acids can all be represented in a general form (lac-dye), where the derivative A is the most important.

The different derivatives include:

Acid B (3,5,6,8-tetrahydroxy-7-[2-hydroxy-5-(2-hydroxyethyl)phenyl]-9,10-dioxoanthracene-1,2-dicarboxylic acid)

Acid C (7-[5-(2-amino-2-carboxyethyl)-2-hydroxyphenyl]-3,5,6,8-tetrahydroxy-9,10-dioxoanthracene-1,2-dicarboxylic acid)

Acid D (3,6,8-trihydroxy-1-methyl-9,10-dioxoanthracene-2-carboxylic acid)

Acid E (7-[5-(2-aminoethyl)-2-hydroxyphenyl]-3,5,6,8-tetrahydroxy-9,10-dioxoanthracene-1,2-dicarboxylic acid)

== Structure ==
Name	Structure	Molecular formula	MW (g/mol)	CAS number
Laccaic acid A		C_{26}H_{19}NO_{12}	537.44	15979-35-8
Laccaic acid B		C_{24}H_{16}O_{12}	496.38	17249-00-2
Laccaic acid C		C_{25}H_{17}NO_{13}	539.41	23241-56-7
Laccaic acid D		C_{16}H_{10}O_{7}	314.25	18499-84-8
Laccaic acid E		C_{24}H_{17}NO_{11}	495.40	14597-16-1

Mixture of laccaic acid A-E: CAS 60687-93-6

Laccaic acid A has an amide functional group in its structure while the acids B, C, and E have amine groups. The only difference between the acid D and kermesic acid is a hydroxide function missing on the position 8.

== Isolation/extraction ==
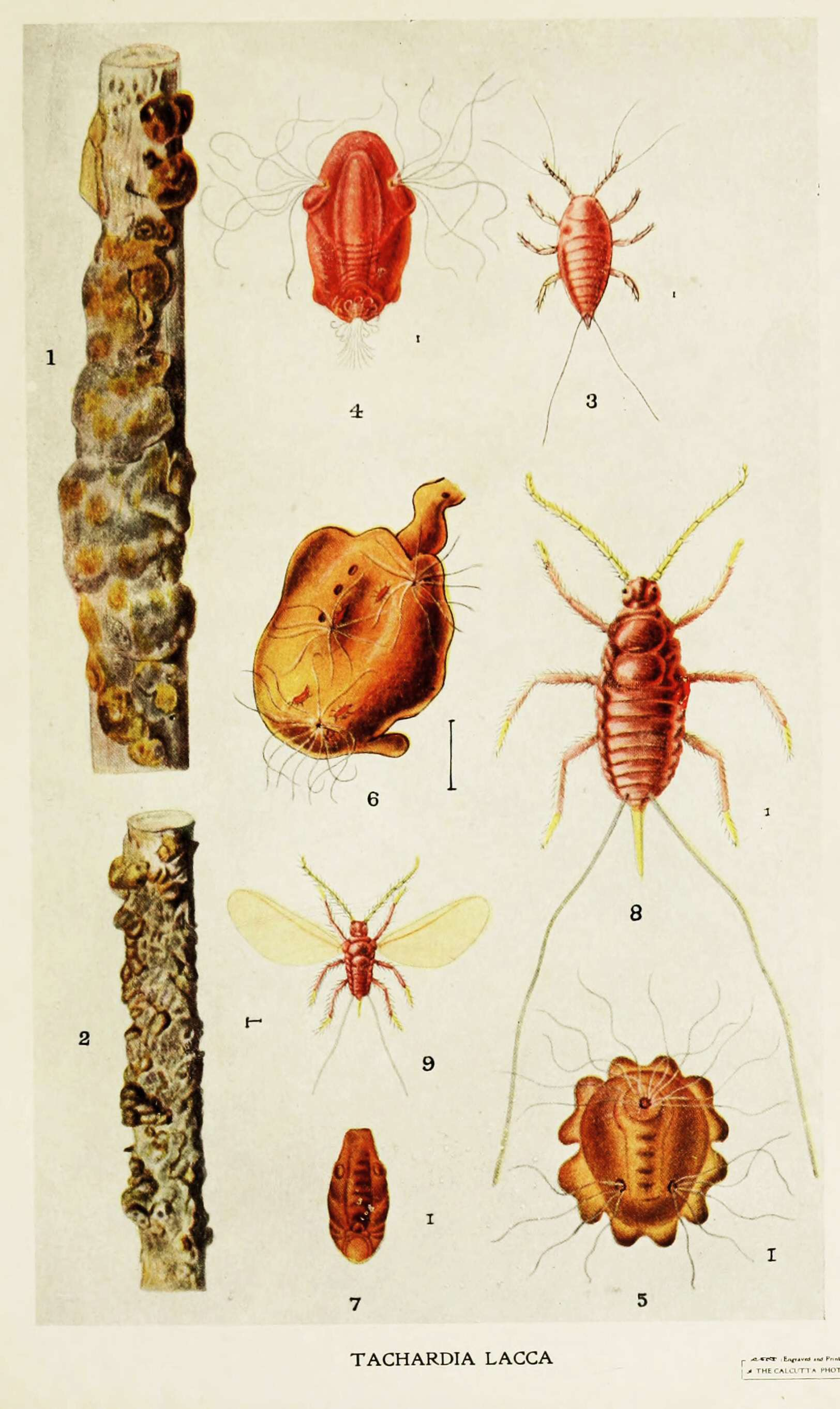
A picture of Kerria lacca

Acids A, B, C, and E can be isolated from lac dye through many different ways: microwave induced from lac insects, high speed counter-current chromatography or liquid chromatography-mass spectrometry.

=== Extraction from the stick lac ===
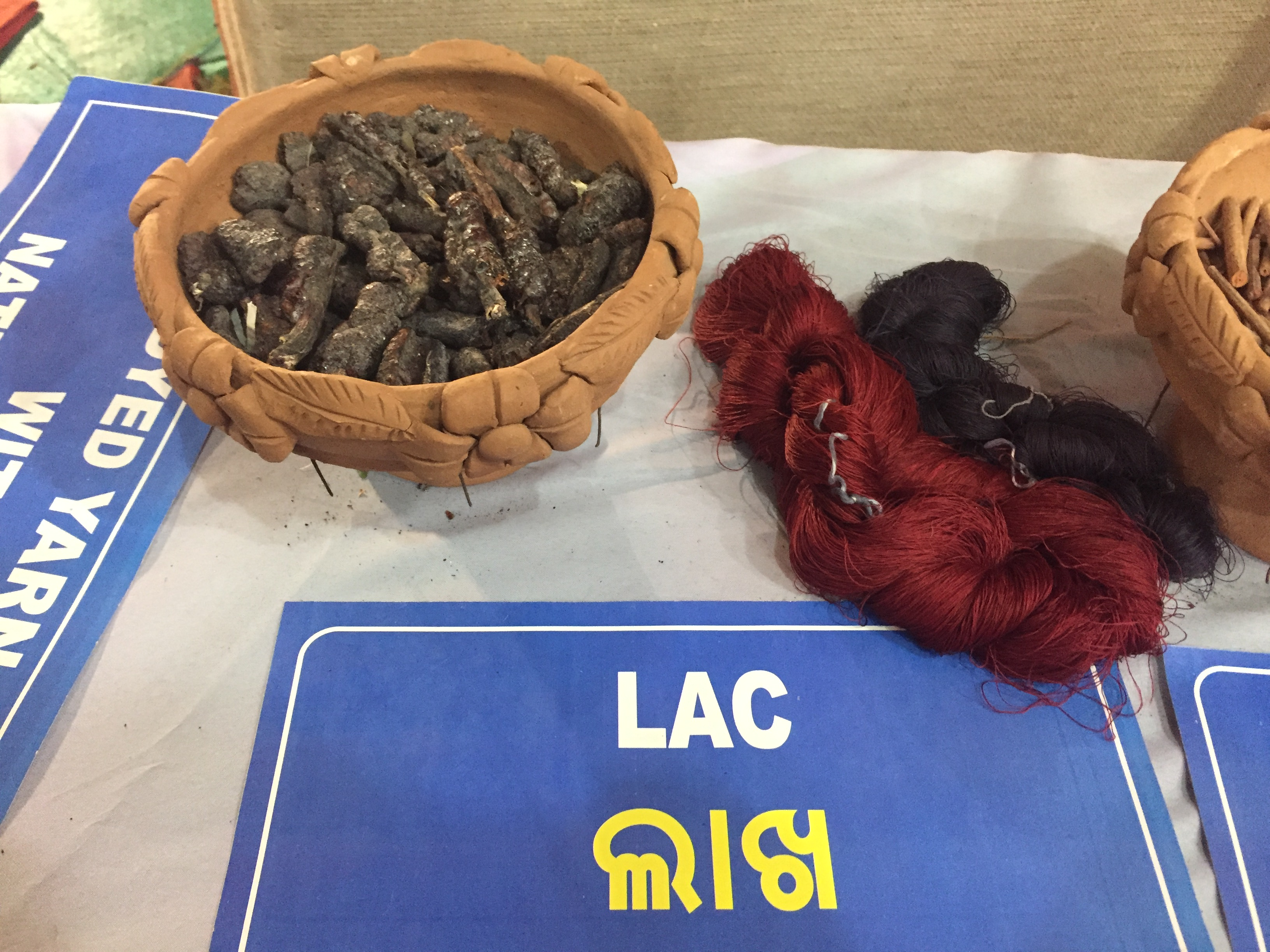
Stick lac next to colored silk strings

The stick lac collected from Rain trees (mostly located in Asia) can be powdered in a mill and finely ground. The powdered material is extracted with deionized water at 60°C for 1 h. The aqueous solution is filtered and then concentrated under reduced pressure in a rotary evaporator to give a crude lac dye extract, which can then be used without further purification. This extract can be directly named lac dye.

== Biochemical properties ==
DNMT1 is inhibited by LCA which has a stronger inhibitory effect than SG-1027 (HY-13962). LCA is a class of DNMT inhibitors may be a useful mechanism to inhibit DNMT.

== Use ==
As a major component of lac dye, LCA is usually chosen as a representative for the lac dye to describe their thermodynamics properties including adsorption, dyeability, fastness and shade variation of lac dyeing on silk and cotton. Studies indicate that the intermolecular interactions between LCA and fibers as well as between LCA and mordants play a key role on the adsorption and dyeability of lac dye.

=== Dyeing fabric ===
Lac extract produces purple colors. Lac is not so fast in cellulose fibers (plant fibers). Lac is very sensitive to pH, increasing alkalinity will turn the colors plummy purple, while acidity will give bright oranges. However, colors that have been altered by the pH change may turn red again after washing.
