= Gustave Planchon =

French pharmacist, paleontologist, and botanist (1833–1900)

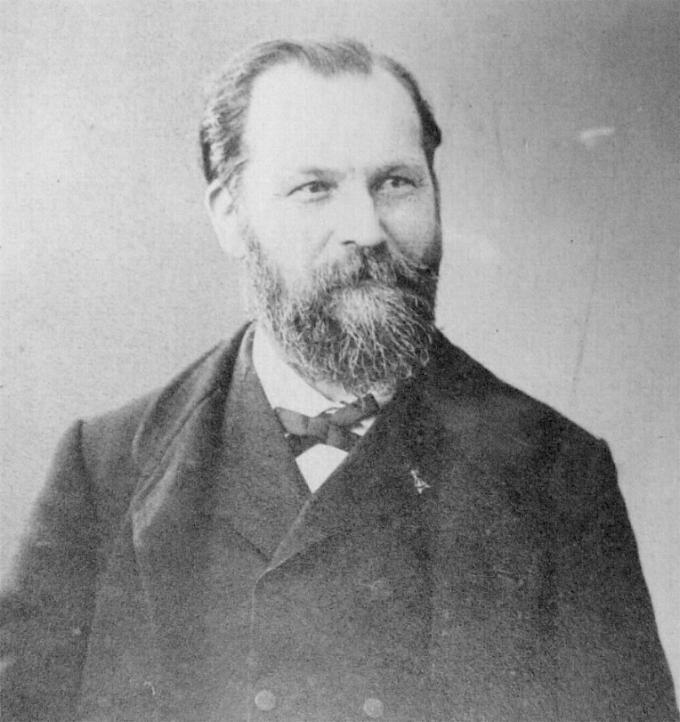
- Born: 29 October 1833
- Died: 13 April 1900 (aged 66)
- Scientific career
- Fields: Paleontology; botany
- Thesis: Études des tufs calcaires de Montpellier au point de vue géologique et paléontologique (1864)

François Gustave Planchon (October 29, 1833 – April 13, 1900) was a French pharmacist, paleontologist, and botanist. He also studied geology and the biology of the cochineal insect.

== Life and work ==
Planchon was born in Ganges, Hérault, the son of candle manufacturer David and Marie Coularou. His brother Jules-Emil also became a botanist. After school he joined the medical faculty at Montpellier and graduated in 1859 with a dissertation on Globularia, particularly of G. alypum, and their medical properties. He conducted experiments on himself and at the Saint-Éloi hospital in Montpellier. A decoction of the leaves was found to be a mild purgative. He then joined the faculty after a study of the quinquinas (Cinchona) in 1860. He served as a professeur agrégé for two years and then wrote another thesis on the tufas of the quaternary in Montpellier and the changing flora of the region. He also wrote a dissertation on Kermes vermilio. In 1864 he became an associate professor at the École supérieure de pharmacie de Montpellier. In 1872 he became chair of natural history of drugs and stayed in the position until his death. In 1875 he wrote a paper on the botany of jaborandi, a plant in the genus Pilocarpus that had become medically of interest for its ability to induce intense sweating and reduce vascular pressure. He described several medicinal plants including Strychnos gubleri.

Planchon received a Hanbury Gold Medal (1888) and was a member of numerous learned societies dealing in botany including the botanical society of France, the Royal Botanic Society of London as well as pharmacy related societies. He was appointed chevalier of the Légion d’Honneur (1881) and officier in 1898.
