= Jrarat, Armavir =

Village in Armavir, Armenia

Jrarat Ջրառատ
- Location within Armenia
- Coordinates: 40°04′17″N 44°15′47″E
- Country: Armenia
- Marz (Province): Armavir

Population (2011)
  - Total: 2,981
- Time zone: UTC+4 ( )

Jrarat (Armenian: Ջրառատ) formerly known as Gharkhun or Verin Gharkhun, is a village in the Armavir Province of Armenia. It has a large poultry industry and nearby is a piece of land reserved for the cochineal dye beetles, Porphyrophora hamelii.

Jrarat has a population of 2,981 at the 2011 census.

In addition to the 2,981 people in the town, the Jrarrat Poultry Farm has an additional 1,165 residents (2001 census) in its workers' housing, bringing the population of the area to 4,000.

== See also ==
- Armavir Province
