= Johann Philipp Breyne =

German botanist, palaeontologist, zoologist and entomologist

- Born: August 9, 1680; Danzig, Royal Prussia, Kingdom of Poland
- Died: December 12, 1764 (aged 84); Danzig, Royal Prussia, Kingdom of Poland
- Occupations: botanist, palaeontologist, zoologist and entomologist

Johann Philipp Breyne FRS (9 August 1680, Danzig (Gdańsk), Poland – 12 December 1764, Danzig, Poland), was a German botanist, palaeontologist, zoologist and entomologist. He is best known for his work on the Polish cochineal (Porphyrophora polonica), an insect formerly used in production of red dye. Proposed by Hans Sloane, he was elected, on 21 April 1703, a Fellow of the Royal Society. He was also a member of the German Academy of Sciences Leopoldina (after 1715) and the Societas Litteraria (after 1720).

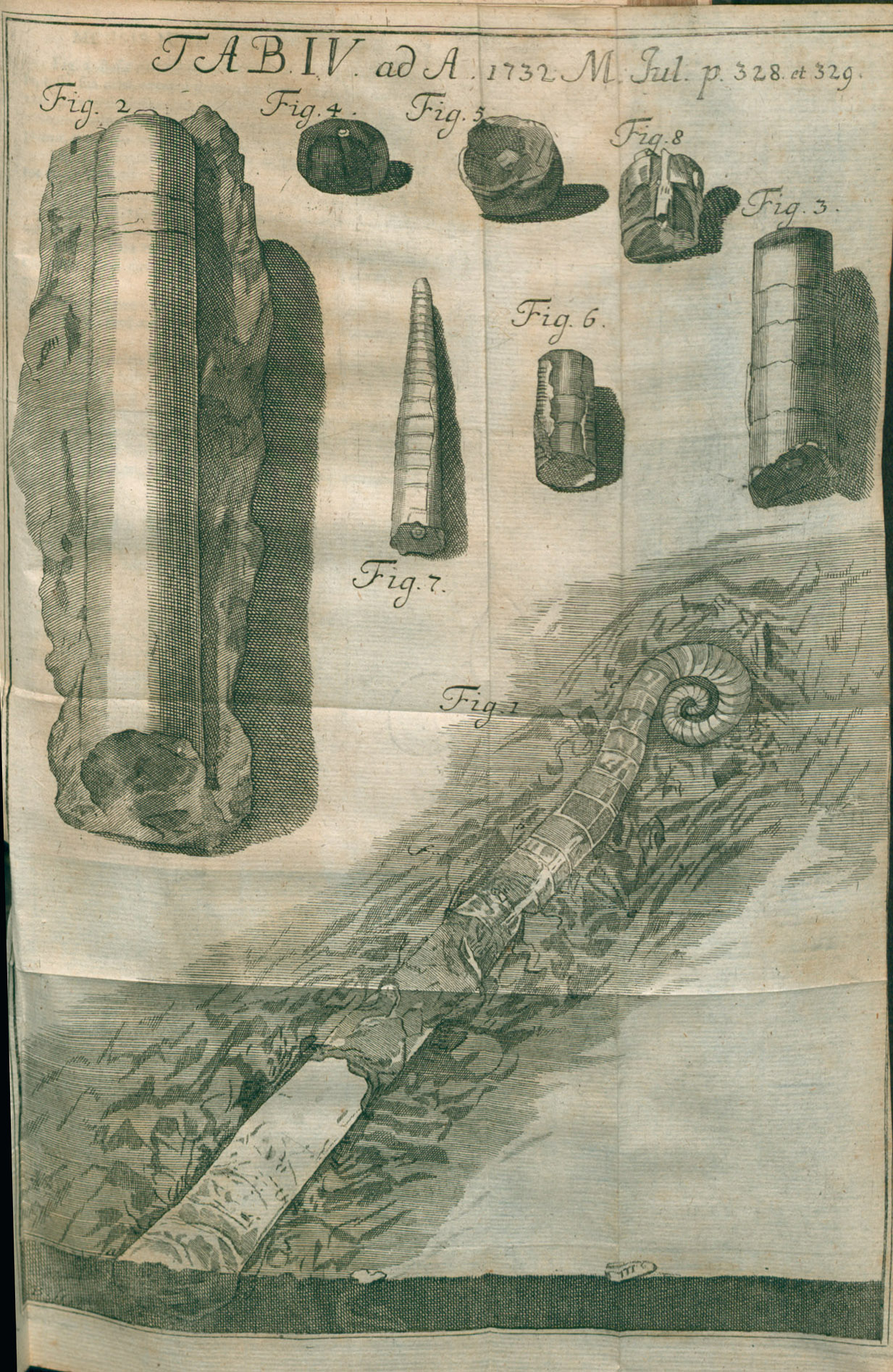
Illustration from critique of Dissertatio physica de polythalamis published in Acta Eruditorum, 1732

== Biography ==
Johann Philipp Breyne was the son of Jacob Breyne. After the death of his father, he studied at Leiden University. His teachers included Govard Bidloo and Herman Boerhaave. in 1699 he was awarded the title of Doctor of Medicine.

In August 1702, accompanied by letters of recommendation from his teachers, he travelled to England for a nine-month study visit. There he was first received by James Petiver and soon met other influential members of the Royal Society, such as Hans Sloane and John Ray.

In October 1703 he arrived in Italy on board an English frigate. In Padua he visited Antonio Vallisneri. Via Bologna he came to Ancona, where he collected sea animals on the Adriatic coast. He returned to Danzig via Austria, Bohemia, Germany and finally Holland at the end of 1704. There he first practiced as a doctor and a short time later married Constantia Ludewig. They had six children.

In his house on Langgasse in Danzig, which was located in the immediate vicinity of Jacob Theodor Klein, he built up an extensive natural history collection by exchanging with other scientists. In his garden he cultivated a variety of exotic plants. His garden was visited in 1716 by tsar Peter the Great and his personal physician Robert Erskine. Since Breyne was wealthy, he was finally able to turn completely to natural science.

His diverse interests are evident in his works. in 1705 he published a short article in the Philosophical Transactions on the scale louse Porphyrophora polonica, which he had observed on the Spanish coast near Valencia. In 1731 he dedicated an extensive publication to the little animal. in 1725 he reported a plant leaf encased in amber. Together with Hans Sloane, he published a work in 1737, on mammoth bones excavated in Siberia.

His most important achievement is the completion of the work Prodromi fasciculi rariorum plantarum primus et secundus, left by his father... which he worked on from his return to Danzig until 1739.

At the suggestion of Hans Sloane, he was elected a member of the Royal Society on April 21, 1703. He was a member of the Leopoldina (from 1715), Académie des sciences (from 1715) and the Societas Litteraria (from 1720), a forerunner of the Naturforschende Gesellschaft in Danzig.

Johann Philipp Breyne died on 12 December 1764 in Danzig at age 84.

The Breyne family's estate is now housed in the Gotha Research Library.

== Family ==
On 9 September 1707 Johann Philipp Breyne married Constantia Ludewig, daughter of juror Heinrich Ludewig. They had six children:

- Constantia Philippine Breyne (born 1708) – second wife of the mayor of Danzig Friedrich Reyger (1692–1753).
- Anna Renata Breyne (1713–1759) – poet.
- Johanna Henriette Breyne (1714–1797) – was married to doctor Peter Castell (1724–1799).
- Johann Heinrich Breyne (1715–1740)
- Florentine Charlotte Breyne (1719–1756) – first wife of merchant and senator in Danzig Johann Heinrich Soermans (1722–1775), who was a son of Dutch merchant and Ambassador of the Netherlands in Gdansk Hendrik Soermans (1700–1775), who was a great-grandfather of philosopher Arthur Schopenhauer.
- Philipp Jacob Breyne (1722–1733)

== Works ==
- De Plantis & Insectis Quibusdam Rarioribus in Hispania Observatis, In: Philosophical Transactions. Bd. 24, S. 2044–2055, 1704/1705
- Epistola D. J. Phil. Breynij, M. D. Gedanensis, & Reg. Societ. Lond. Sodal. ad D. Hans Sloane, M. D. Dictoe Societatis Secretarium; Varias Observationes Continens, in Itinere per Italiam Suscepto, Anno 1703. Bd. 17, S. 447–459, 1710/1712
- Dissertatiuncula de Agno Vegetabili Scythico, Borametz Vulgo Dicto, In: Philosophical Transactions. Bd. 33, S. 353–360, 1724/1725
- Observatio de Succinea Gleba, Plantae Cujusdam Folio Impraegnata, Rarissima, Bd. 34, S. 154–156, 1725/1726
- Historia naturalis Cocci Radicum Tinctorii quod polonicum vulgo audit (Danzig, 1731)
- Some Corrections and Amendments by J. P. Breynius, M.D. F.R.S. concerning the Generation of the Insect Called by Him Coccus Radicum, in His Natural History Thereof, Printed in the Year 1731..., In: Philosophical Transactions Bd. 37, S. 444–447, 1731/1732
- A Letter from John Phil. Breyne, M. D. F. R. S. to Sir Hans Sloane, Bart. Pres. R. S. with Observations, and a Description of Some Mammoth's Bones Dug up in Siberia, Proving Them to Have Belonged to Elephants, In: Philosophical Transactions Bd. 40, S. 124–138, 1737
- Prodromi fasciculi rariorum plantarum primus et secundus... (1739) – Aus dem Nachlass seines Vaters
- Observatio de Immodico & Funesto Lapidum Cancrorum, Similiumque Terrestrium Absorbentium Usu, Indeque Ortis Calculis in Ventriculo & Renibus, In: Philosophical Transactions Bd. 41, S. 557–559, 1739/1741 (with Hans Sloane)
