= Kermes (dye) =

Red dye derived from scale insects in genus Kermes

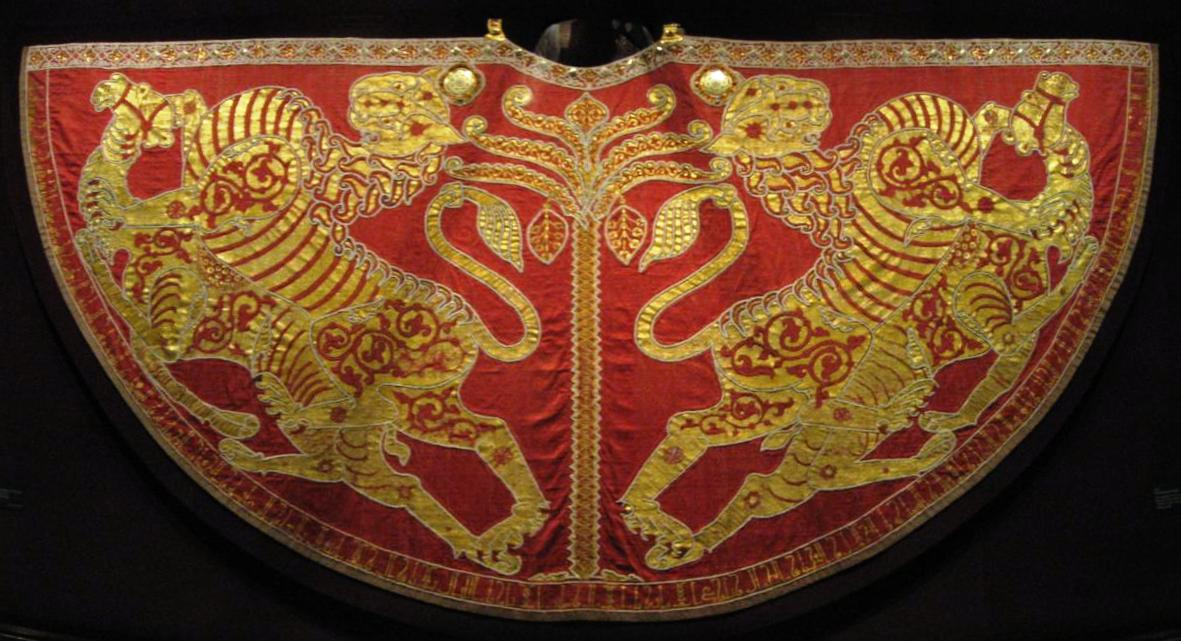
The Coronation Mantle of Roger II of Sicily, silk dyed with kermes and embroidered with gold thread and pearls. Royal Workshop, Palermo, Sicily, 1133–34. Imperial Treasury, Vienna.

Kermes is a red dye derived from the dried bodies of the females of a scale insect in the genus Kermes, primarily Kermes vermilio. The Kermes insects are native to the Mediterranean region and are parasites living on the sap of the host plant, the Kermes oak (Quercus coccifera) and the Palestine oak (Quercus calliprinos).

These insects were used as a red dye since antiquity by the ancient Egyptians, Mesopotamians, Indians, Greeks, Romans, and Iranians. The dye also served a number of ritual and practical purposes in the Hebrew Bible.

The kermes dye is a rich red, a crimson. It has good colour fastness in silk and wool. It was much esteemed in the medieval era for dyeing silk and wool, particularly scarlet cloth. Following the Columbian exchange it was superseded by the similar, and more easily obtained, cochineal.

== Etymology ==
Kermes ultimately derives from the Sanskrit word कृमिज or kṛmija meaning "worm-made". This was adopted into Persian and later Arabic as قرمز qermez. The modern English word kermes was borrowed from the French term kermès.

== History ==
Kermes dye is of ancient origin; jars of kermes have been found in a Neolithic cave-burial at Adaouste, northeast of Aix-en-Provence. The early Egyptians made use of the kermes dye.

In the Middle Ages, rich crimson and scarlet silks dyed with kermes in the new silk-weaving centers of Italy and Sicily exceeded the legendary Tyrian purple "in status and desirability". The dyestuff was called "grain" (grana) in all Western European languages because the desiccated eggs resembled fine grains of wheat (or sand), and they were mistaken for plants; so textiles dyed with kermes were described as dyed in the grain. Woollens were frequently dyed blue with woad before spinning and weaving, and then piece-dyed in kermes, producing a wide range colours from blacks and grays through browns, murreys, purples, and sanguines. One source dated to the 12th-century notes that kermes dye adheres best to animal-based fibers (e.g. wool, silk, etc.), rather than to plant-based fibers (e.g. cotton, linen, etc.).

By the 14th and early 15th century, full grain pure kermes scarlet was regarded as "by far the most esteemed, most regal" colour for luxury woollen textiles in the Low Countries, England, France, Spain and Italy.

Following the Spanish conquest of the Aztec Empire, Mexican cochineal, which produced a stronger dye and could thus be used in smaller quantities, replaced kermes dyes in general use in Europe.

In 2016, an archaeological excavation in the "Cave of Skulls" in the Judaean Desert uncovered a woven fabric that potentially used Kermes scarlet dye. Dated to the Middle Bronze Age, it is the earliest example found in Israel. In 2024, researchers, joined by Hebrew University, Bar-Ilan University, and the Israel Antiquities Authority published a paper in the Journal of Archaeological Science that this artifact was confirmed to be colored by the dye from the Kermes vermilio.

== In culture ==
=== The biblical scarlet (tolaʻat šanī) ===
In the Bible, scarlet was one of three principal pigments used in the Temple curtain, appurtenances, and sacred vestments. In some cases scarlet wool threads were woven together with threads of other colors; elsewhere a purely scarlet fabric was required. In addition, scarlet-dyed yarn was thrown as an adjunct into the burning ashes of the Red heifer, and was used as an adjunct in the purification ritual of lepers who had been healed.

The English word for the biblical "scarlet" (Exodus 25:4, etc.) is a literal translation from the Septuagint (Koine Greek: κόκκινον = kókkinon, meaning "scarlet"). The original Hebrew text (tola'at shani) translates to "scarlet worm", indicating that the scarlet color is derived from an insect, a requirement which was formalized in the Jerusalem Talmud (Kila'im 9:1 [32a]). This insect, generally mistaken for a plant, was known in the Roman world as grani coccum = "the grain of scarlet."

While production of the crimson or scarlet dye from the kermes scale insect had, traditionally, been an art preserved with medieval dyers, the practice seemed to have been lost for many centuries. Late exponents of Jewish law were baffled by the Tosefta's ruling that tola'at shani (scarlet colored ritual wool) may only be made from the tola'at (worm-like aphid) which lives in the mountainous regions. The dye's crimson or scarlet-orange tinge is alluded to in an early rabbinic source, Pesikta Rabbati, where tola'at shani is said to be "neither red, nor green," but of an intermediate color. Biblical exegete Saadia Gaon (882–942) wrote that the scarlet colored fabric was qirmiz (Arabic: قرمز), derived from the kermes insect and which produced a color ranging from Venetian scarlet to crimson. According to Saadia, the dye was applied to silk yarns. A rare 10th-century Arabic document was retrieved by Zohar Amar, from which he was able to reproduce the dye extract, using antique methods.

=== Hebrew Bible ===
In the Hebrew Bible, scarlet was considered a striking and lively color, and was used in priestly garments and other ritual items, but could also symbolize sin.

=== Judaism ===
Scarlet was one of the chief colors used to decorate the bridal chamber in Jewish weddings, in which large colored sheets of scarlet overlaid with gold were hung.

As part of the Yom Kippur Temple service, a scarlet thread was tied to the horns of the scapegoat, before it was sent to the desert.

== Dye production ==
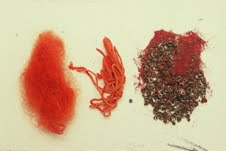
Wool dyed with the scale insect kermes

Out of the four kermes scale insects tested in Israel, the wingless female Kermes echinatus with her unhatched eggs still in her body yielded the brightest red colorant. The scale insect is first dried and ground to a powder. The dyestuff is then placed in a pot of water and cooked on a low heat, which turns the water red. The water is then strained and is ready for use. Those familiar with the dyeing technique have noted that before inserting the fabric into the bath containing the dye solution, the fabric is first dipped into a bath of dissolved alum, which, when added to the dye solution, gives to the fabric its bright reddish-orange color, besides serving as a mordant. Darker shades are achieved by repeating the dyeing process several times, having the fabric dry, and re-dyed.

According to field research conducted by Amar and colleagues, the female K. echinatus insect, which has a camouflage color of grey to reddish-brown, "produces the dye pigment in both her body and in her eggs, only at the peak of her adulthood, which continues for no more than one month, around July and August." A delay in harvesting the scale insect with eggs may result in a significant reduction in dye production. After collecting, the insects are first dried in the shade for a period of one week, ground to a powder, and then steeped in water for 45 minutes and which maintains a low-heated temperature of 60 to 80 °C (140 to 176 °F). To this hot bath is added the fabric to absorb the dye. Heating the dye solution to a temperature more than this is liable to destroy the pigment or to cause fading. When alum is added to the dye substance as a mordant, a bright red-orange hue is obtained, which color is then made color-fast.

Structure of kermesic acid

Chemical analysis of the dye extract shows a high percentage of kermesic acid (C_{16}H_{10}O_{8}) and flavokermesic acid. Wool dyed in an acid bath solution with kermes produced a red-orange hue, but without the acidic addition the color remained a brick red or dark red. Other acid bath solutions produced a golden-yellow hue.

Amar found that the host trees in the Land of Israel (viz. Quercus calliprinos) produced varied sizes of the scale insect Kermes echinatus, the largest of which being found in Israel's north, particularly in the Upper Galilee region and in the northern parts of the Golan Heights, which reached a mean size of 6.4–5 millimeters. However, the scale insect's distribution was not uniform. Some trees were affected by the parasites, while others were not. 1 kilogram (2.2 lb) of freshly harvested kermes scale insects loses about two-thirds of its weight when dried. The dried dyestuff is sold either in its raw form as kernels, as powder, or as briquettes. Approximately 50,000 to 60,000 scale insects are needed to produce one kilogram of the dried dyestuff.

== See also ==
- Alchermes
- Natural dye
- Porphyrophora
- Vermillion

== Bibliography ==
- Amar, Z.; Gottlieb, Hugo; Varshavsky, Lucy; Iluz, David (2005). "The Scarlet Dye of the Holy Land". BioScience. 55 (12). American Institute of Biological Sciences: 1080–1083. doi:10.1641/0006-3568(2005)055[1080:TSDOTH]2.0.CO;2.
- Amar, Z. (2007). Serri, Yaron (ed.). Tracking the scarlet dye of the Holy Land (Be-ʻiḳvot tolaʻat ha-shani ha-Erets-Yiśreʼelit) (in Hebrew). ISBN 978-965-90818-2-0. OCLC 645876294.
- Barber, E. J. W. (1991). Prehistoric Textiles. Princeton University Press. ISBN 0-691-00224-X.
- Bleich, J. David (1967). "A Review of Halakhic Literature Pertaining to the Reinstitution of the Sacrificial Order". Tradition: A Journal of Orthodox Jewish Thought. 9 (3). Rabbinical Council of America (RCA): 103–124. JSTOR 23256821.
- Goodwin, Jill (1982). A Dyer's Manual. Pelham. ISBN 0-7207-1327-7.
- Jenkins, David, ed. (2003). The Cambridge History of Western Textiles. Cambridge University Press. ISBN 0-521-34107-8.
- Netherton, Robin; Gale R. Owen-Crocker, eds. (2007). Medieval Clothing and Textiles. Vol. 3. Boydell Press. ISBN 978-1-84383-291-1.
- Meir Ish Shalom of Vienna (ed.). Midrash Pesikta Rabbati (in Hebrew). Israel: not identified. OCLC 249274973.
- Schoeser, Mary (2007). Silk. Yale University Press. ISBN 978-0-300-11741-7.
