= Arazap =

Village in Armavir, Armenia

Arazap Արազափ
- Location within Armenia
- Coordinates: 40°02′34″N 44°08′45″E
- Country: Armenia
- Marz (Province): Armavir

Population (2011)
  - Total: 1,362
- Time zone: UTC+4 ( )
  - Summer (DST): UTC+5 ( )

Arazap (Armenian: Արազափ) is a village in the Armavir Province of Armenia.

== See also ==
- Armavir Province
