= Marcin of Urzędów =

Marcin z Urzędowa
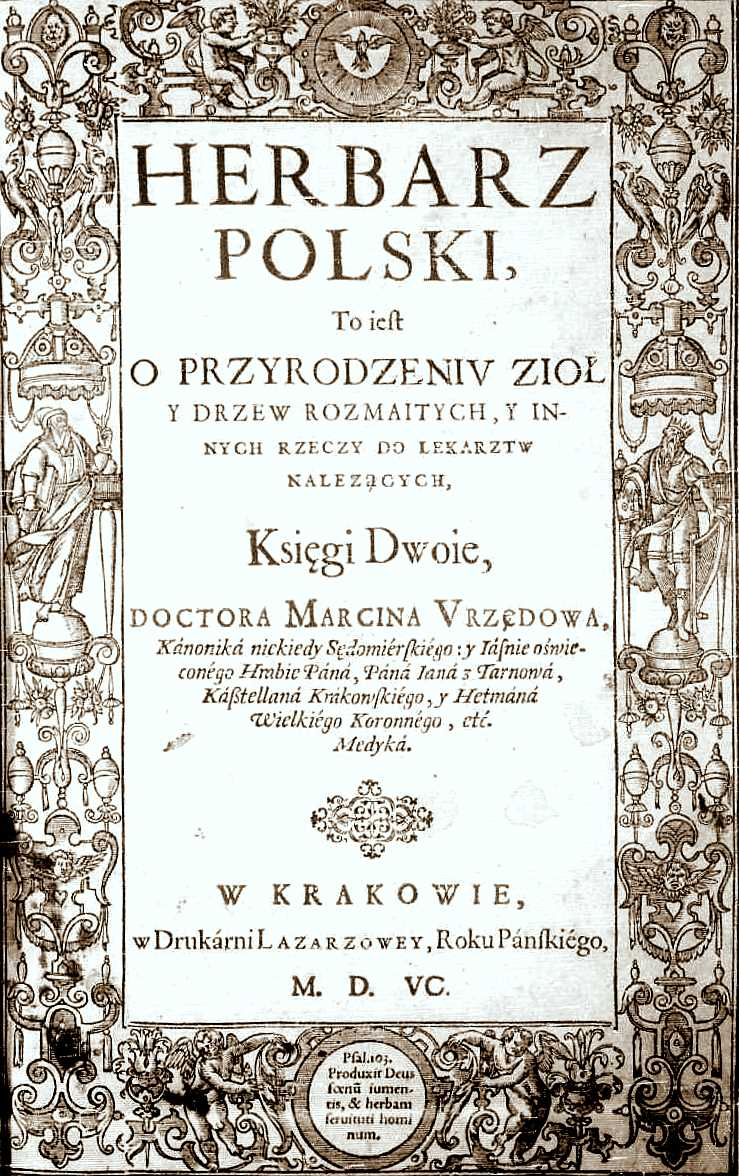
- Title page of Marcin's Herbarz polski ("Polish Herbal")
- Born: c. 1500–1502; Urzędów, Poland
- Died: June 22, 1573; Sandomierz, Poland
- Occupations: Priest, physician, pharmacist, botanist

Marcin of Urzędów (Polish: Marcin z Urzędowa, [ˈmart͡ɕin zuʐɛnˈdɔva]; ca. 1500–1573) was a Polish Roman Catholic priest, physician, pharmacist and botanist known especially for his Herbarz polski ("Polish Herbal").

Marcin, son of Szymon, was born c. 1500–1502 in Urzędów, Lublin Voivodeship, Poland. From 1517 to 1525, he studied at the Jagiellonian University in Kraków. After graduation, he stayed at the university as a lecturer in physics, mathematics, logic and philosophy. He became the head of the university's Collegium Minus (Minor College) in 1529 and was named dean in 1533, the same year when he was ordained priest. Between 1533 and 1535, he continued his studies at the University of Padua in Italy where he achieved the degree of Doctor of Medicine. He later traveled to Venice, Switzerland and Hungary.

Upon his return to Poland, he was given a prebendary in Sandomierz. Marcin became a pastor at Urzędów parish in 1544 and additionally at another parish in nearby Modliborzyce in 1546. In 1563, he became a canon at the Cathedral of the Nativity of the Blessed Virgin Mary in Sandomierz.

Marcin ran the Holy Spirit Hospital in Sandomierz and, until 1561, worked as hetman Jan Tarnowski's court physician. Between 1542 and 1557, he was writing his two-volume opus magnum whose full title is Herbarz polski, to iest o przyrodzeniu zioł y drzew rozmaitych, y innych rzeczy do lekarztw należących ("Polish Herbal, or Of the Complexion of Various Herbs and Trees, and Other Things of which Medicines Comprise").

Marcin of Urzędów died on June 22, 1573, in Sandomierz, where he was buried. The Polish Herbal was published in 1595, i.e. 22 years after its author's death.

== See also ==
- List of Roman Catholic scientist-clerics
