= Quantum satis =

Latin term

Quantum satis (abbreviation q.s. or Q.S.) is a Latin term meaning the amount which is enough. It has its origins as a quantity specification in medicine and pharmacology, where a similar term quantum sufficit ("as much as is sufficient") has been used (abbreviated Q.S.). Quantum satis is also used in the same function in food regulations and food safety laws in the European Community (EC/EU).

The specification of quantum satis for an ingredient essentially means "Add as much of this ingredient as is needed to achieve the desired result, but not more."

In food safety regulations in the EU it is a catch-all restriction for artificial food ingredients (especially food additives) which are harmless enough to have no specific quantity restriction.

It serves to protect consumers from the addition of excessive and unnecessary amounts of such artificial food additives in their foodstuffs and compels producers to:

- Introduce minimal additives to food for human consumption
- Observe Good Manufacturing Practice
- Refrain from wilful consumer deception

For example, European Union directive 94/36/EC (which regulates the use of food colors) explains in Article 2 (7): "In the Annexes to this Directive 'quantum satis' means that no maximum level is specified. However, coloring matters shall be used according to good manufacturing practice at a level not higher than is necessary to achieve the intended purpose and provided that they do not mislead the customer". The words quantum satis are used with reference to a number of substances in the Annexes III and IV to the EU directive 94/36/EC.
