= Kermesic acid =

Names
- IUPAC name 3,5,6,8-Tetrahydroxy-1-methyl-9,10-dioxoanthracene-2-carboxylic acid
- Other names: C.I. Natural Red 3; 1-Methyl-2-carboxy-3,5,6,8-tetrahydroxyanthraquinone

Identifiers
CAS Number	18499-92-8
3D model (JSmol)	Interactive image
ChEBI	CHEBI:90183
ChemSpider	9901950
KEGG	C22689
PubChem CID	11727234
UNII	2A580G9V9I
CompTox Dashboard (EPA)	DTXSID40471199
- InChI: InChI=1S/C16H10O8/c1-4-9-5(2-6(17)10(4)16(23)24)13(20)12-11(15(9)22)7(18)3-8(19)14(12)21/h2-3,17-19,21H,1H3,(H,23,24) Key: CXORMDKZEUMQHX-UHFFFAOYSA-N
- SMILES: CC1=C2C(=CC(=C1C(=O)O)O)C(=O)C3=C(C2=O)C(=CC(=C3O)O)O

Properties
Chemical formula	C_{16}H_{10}O_{8}
Molar mass	330.248 g·mol^{−1}
Appearance	Red crystalline needles
Melting point	320 °C (608 °F; 593 K) (decomp.)
- Except where otherwise noted, data are given for materials in their standard state (at 25 °C [77 °F], 100 kPa). Infobox references

Kermesic acid is an anthraquinone derivative and the main component of the red dye kermes (false carmine). The compound is the aglycone of carminic acid, the main component of true carmine. As a dye, it is known as Natural Red 3.

Kermesic acid, like carminic acid and the laccaic acids, is an insect dye obtained from scale insects. Kermesic acid is found in insects of the genus Kermes. It is the only colored component of the dye kermes.

The chemical structure of kermesic acid was elucidated by Otto Dimroth in 1916.
