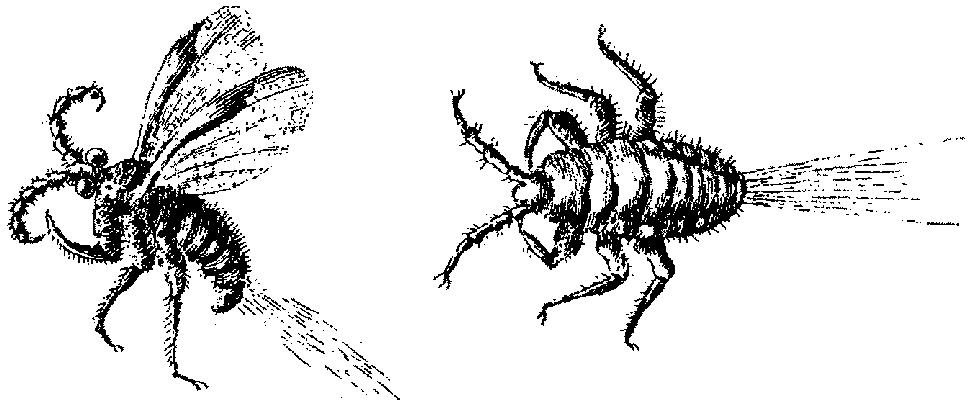
- Adult Polish cochineal, male (left) and female; from Wolfe (1766)

Scientific classification
- Domain: Eukaryota
- Kingdom: Animalia
- Phylum: Arthropoda
- Class: Insecta
- Order: Hemiptera
- Suborder: Sternorrhyncha
- Family: Margarodidae
- Genus: Porphyrophora; Brandt, 1833

Species
- Porphyrophora gigantea; Porphyrophora hamelii; Porphyrophora indica; Porphyrophora italica; Porphyrophora polonica; Porphyrophora tritici; and others

= Porphyrophora =

Genus of true bugs

The scale insect genus Porphyrophora is a large group in the family Margarodidae, which includes the insects Polish cochineal and Armenian cochineal formerly used in dye production.
