= Kermes vermilio =

Scientific classification
- Kingdom: Animalia
- Phylum: Arthropoda
- Clade: Pancrustacea
- Class: Insecta
- Order: Hemiptera
- Suborder: Sternorrhyncha
- Family: Kermesidae
- Genus: Kermes
- Species: K. vermilio

Binomial name
- Kermes vermilio Planchon, 1864

Species of true bug

Kermes vermilio is a species of Kermes that feeds on trees. It is used by humans to make vermilion, though a mineral form used in many cultures and discovered at a similar time is cinnabar (crystallized HgS, mercury sulfide). The word (and dye) crimson is a corruption-derivative of kermes – the organism's genus, chiefly referring to its other species.

== See also ==
- Cochineal
- Armenian cochineal (kirmiz)
- Vermilion
