= Ochre (disambiguation) =

Ochre is a natural pigment and associated color.

Ochre or Ocher may also refer to:

- Ochre (musician) (born 1979), an artist
- Mariya Ocher (born 1986), Russian singer-songwriter
- Ochre River, Manitoba, in Canada
- Ochre, a type of genetics stop codon
- Ocher, alternative spelling of Ochyor, a town in Perm Krai, Russia

== See also ==
- Ogre (disambiguation)
- Ocre, town in Italy
- Antimony ochre
- Attic ochre
- Cobalt ochre
- Golden ochre
- Iron ochre
- Lead ochre
