= Golden ochre =

Natural pigment

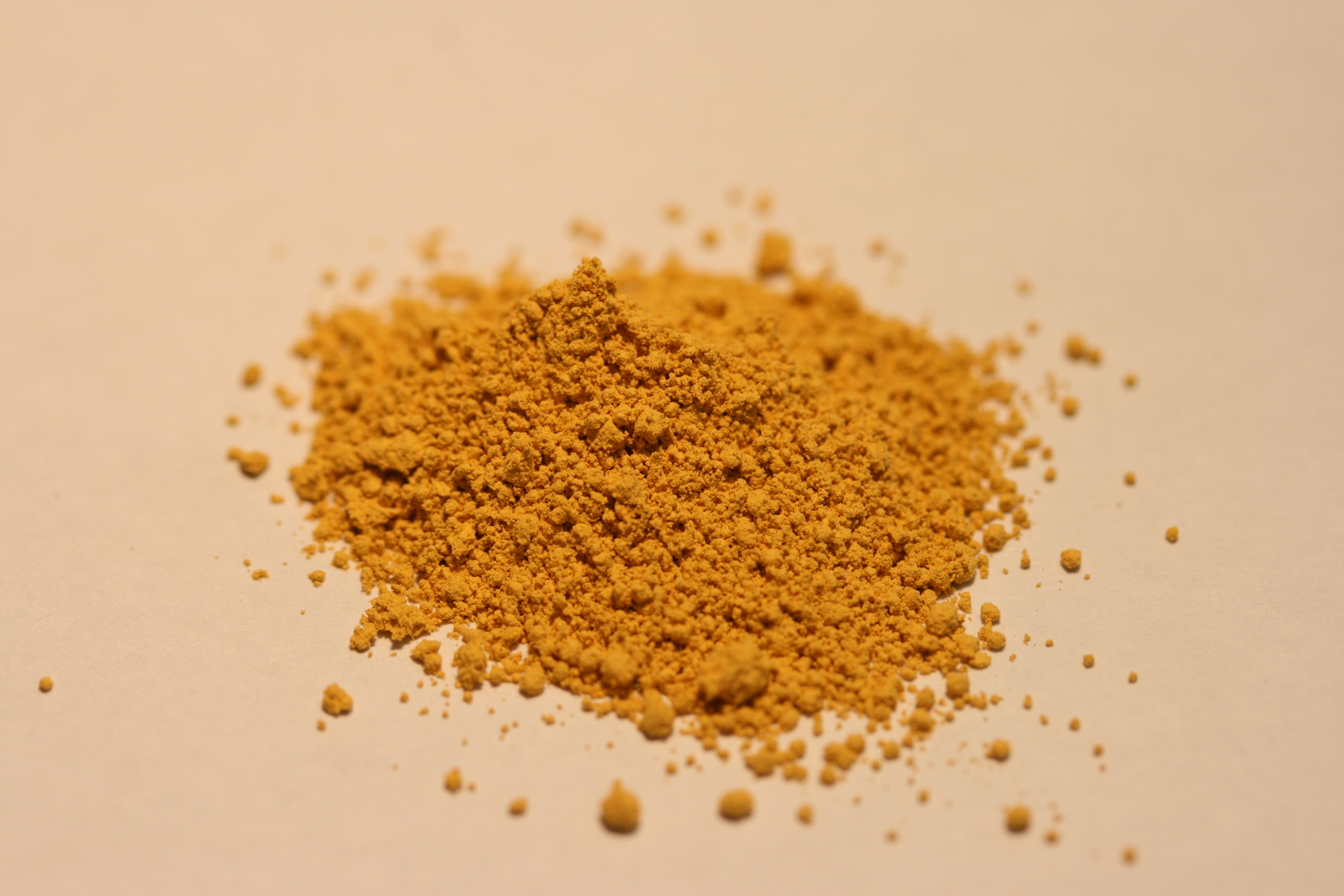
Golden ochre powder

Golden ochre, less often Gold Ochre (French: Ocre d’or, German: Gold Ocker, Ancient Greek: ὠχρός yellow-pale, orange or french ochre (obsolete)) — one of the most famous and brightly colored varieties of ochre — is a natural or (rarely) artificial pigment. In terms of mineral composition, golden ochre is clay with an admixture of aluminosilicates and a high content of the yellow dye itself, iron hydroxide, most often in the form of brown iron ore or limonite. The exact composition of ochre and its impurities vary greatly depending on the place of origin.

Golden ochre is one of the oldest paints, known as a painting material since the times of cave paintings. In wall painting it is one of the main yellow pigments. Golden ochre has good density, the same covering power, high light fastness, pure color and soft structure. To this day it is used in all painting techniques without exception.

== Description and properties ==
The golden ochre pigment is a natural mixture that consists primarily of crystalline iron oxide hydrate with some clay. The closest to golden ochre among related minerals is light ochre, which has a less warm and rich color. If in light ochre the content of the main dye, iron oxide hydrate, is quite low and ranges from 12 to 25%, then in golden ochre its amount can reach 70-75%. As a result, light ochre has a yellow color of a cooler tone and weaker color saturation and is considered a paint that is not bright and not intense. Golden ochre differs from it in its earthy tint and warmer tone.

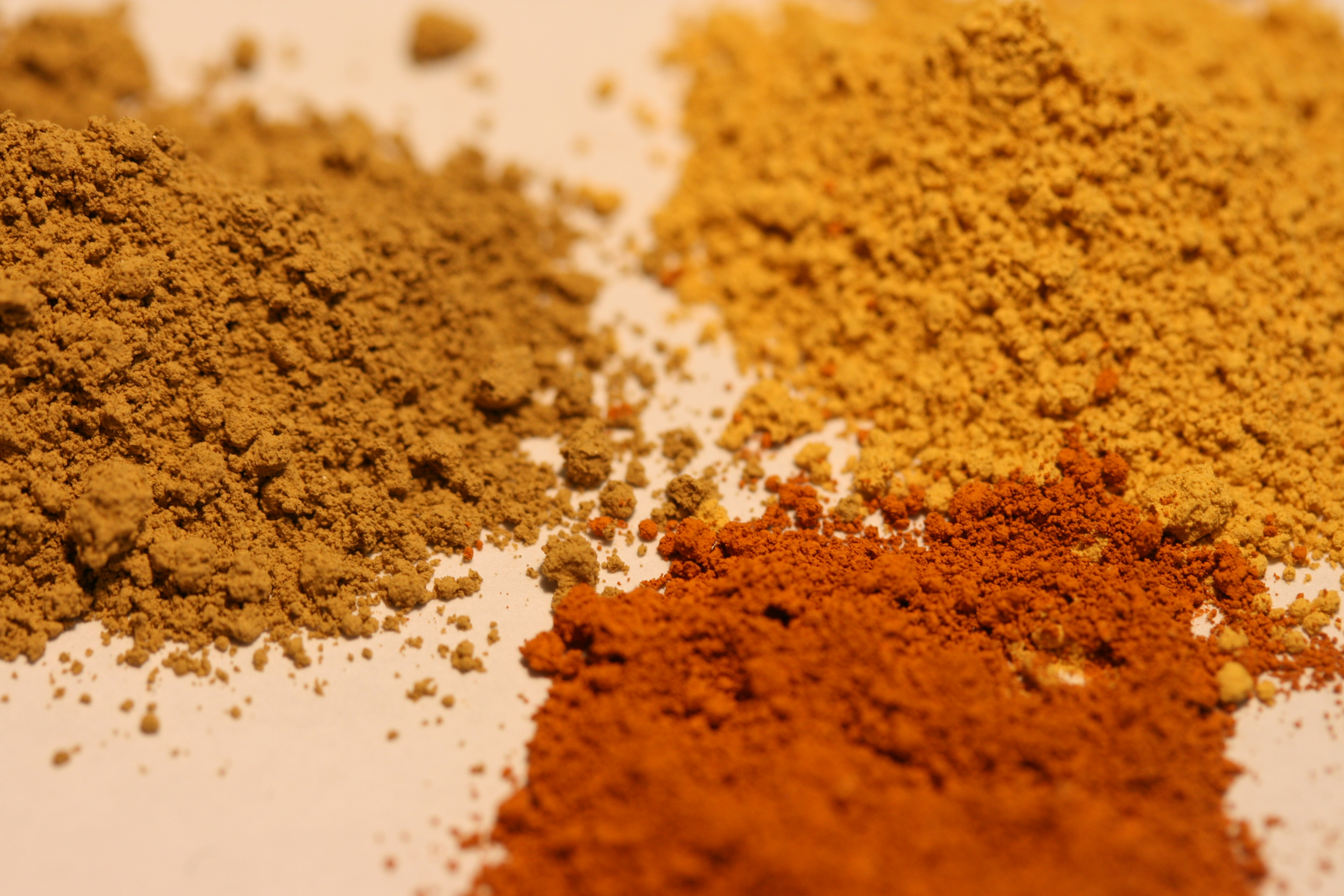
Three types of ochre

Yellow ochres are more common in nature than others due to the abundance of their constituent minerals. When heated, orange and yellow ochre release water and gradually darken, acquiring an increasingly reddish tint. This occurs due to the transformation of iron hydroxide into a dark red anhydrous oxide (iron ochre). With controlled calcination of yellow ochre, almost the entire range of shades can be obtained from yellow and orange to red or brown.

Among other varieties of ochres, it was golden ochre that was valued above others; it was classified as the highest category of pigments in this category. In the 18th-19th centuries, golden ochre was supplied to the rest of Europe and Russia from the province of Rousillon, as a result of which the second name of this paint for a long time was French ochre. Of the total number of ochres, it is the golden ochre pigment that is closer in purity, brightness and shade all to Attic ochre, the most highly valued yellow paint of Ancient Greece and Rome.

Until the mid-20th century, picturesque yellow ochres were traditionally divided into fawn, yellow, saffron yellow, golden and orange. In the modern artist's palette, four types of nominal yellow ochre are most often encountered: light, medium, golden and dark. Natural and Italian sienna can also be considered among the same paints. In terms of composition, golden ochre should include at least 53% Fe_{2}O_{3}, 5% Al_{2}O_{3} and 34% SiO_{2} with the complete absence of impurities such as CaO, MgO, MnO_{2} and insoluble sulfates. For comparison: of all yellow ochres, only dark ochre contains more iron oxide (more than 60%).

== History and use ==
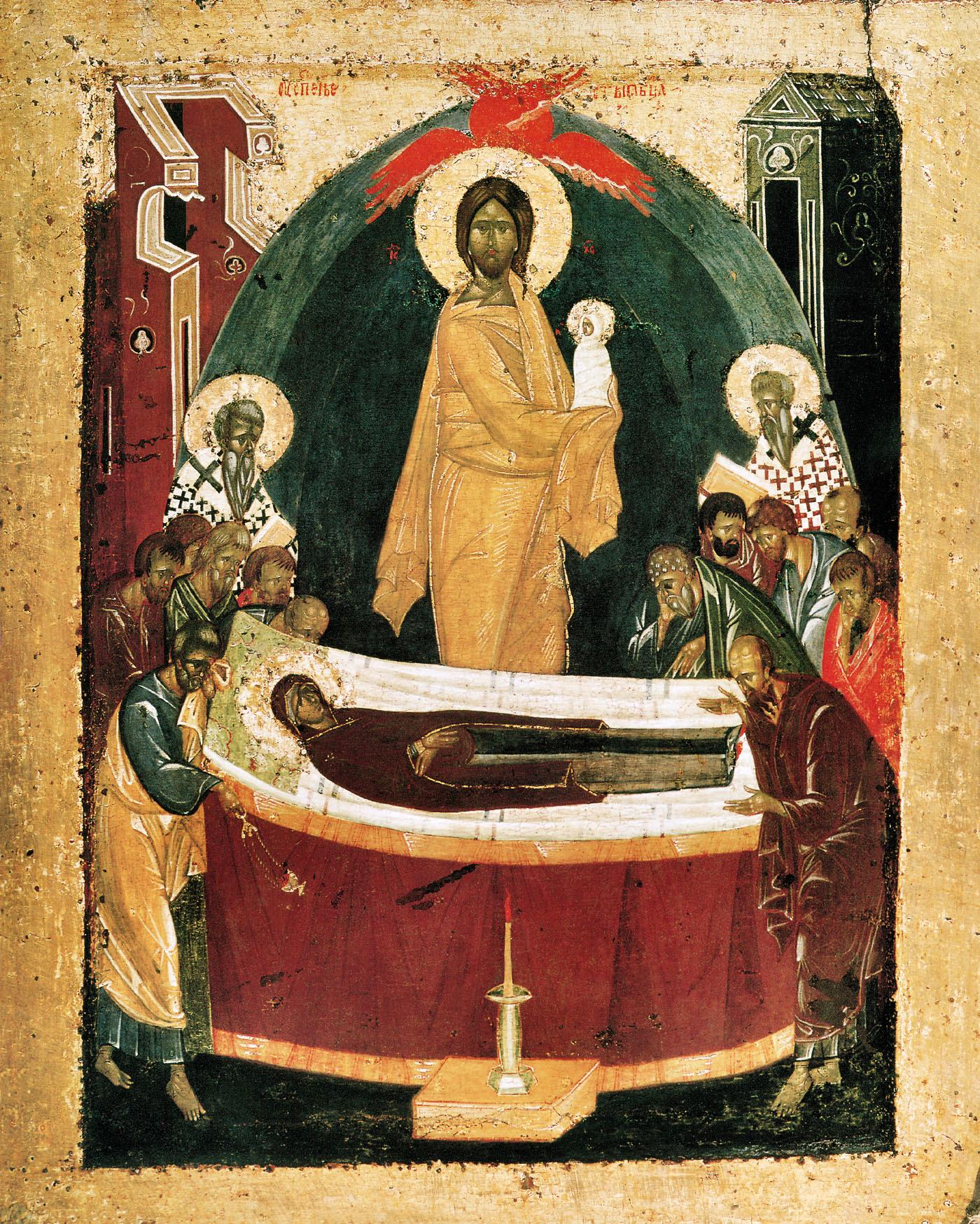
Theophanes the Greek, Dormition of the Mother of God (1392)

Golden ochre is best known as a mineral pigment common in nature, primarily for artistic paints. It has been found since ancient times in rock paintings, frescoes of Ancient Egypt, Greece and Rome. This pigment was also constantly used when painting temples and in icon painting. When analyzing the colorful composition of the icons of Theophan the Greek, despite all the restraint of his color scheme, golden ochre was clearly established.

Golden ochre is also used in the production and restoration of expensive types of furniture. For example, when oil gilding on levkas (gesso), several layers of golden ochre are first applied in oil, and then, after drying and grinding, they are coated with oil gulfarbene varnish. As a result, the surface for gilding is perfectly matte and retains the color of the foil. Gilding on carvings looks especially impressive if shiny polished areas alternate with matte ones.

As an artist's paint, golden ochre has traditionally been a staple in artists palettes, primarily in oil painting, but also in tempera (including watercolor) and more recently, acrylic. It is stable both in pure form and in mixtures. However, when writing with tempera or watercolor, it is necessary to take into account one feature of ochre, dictated by its mineral nature: with a large amount of water-soluble film former, there is a risk of pigment precipitation (both alumina and iron hydroxide), so it is recommended to use ochre in the form of a thick paste.

The muted, slightly "earthy" shade of golden ochre makes it possible to achieve a soft and warm color palette of the painting and, in mixtures with brighter paints, to slightly "reduce" their color activity. There is one more feature. It is generally recommended to avoid very large, raised strokes with pure ochre, since due to the slow and incomplete drying of the layers to the full depth, uneven color and irregular matte surface may appear. The disadvantages of golden ochre include its vulnerability in case of close friction with metal (for example, in the case of rubbing with a palette knife). After some time, such contact can cause the ochre to turn green.

Often light ochre or golden ochre is used to give the painting the impression of external monochrome or unity of color, and also to ensure that the light in the painting does not look colder than the shadow. In this case, ochre performs not only the function of enhancing the feeling of unity of the picture, but also an additional "warming" color.

Golden ochre has been known and widely used as a stable, reliable and inexpensive pigment for any finishing, household and decorative purposes, suitable for painting both interior and exterior work. It does not fade and can withstand almost any weather conditions. A description of a similar use of golden ochre can be found in one of the stories of the Russian writer Sergeev-Tsensky: «...The hives were squat, wide, on four oak logs each, with pitched roofs, covered here with iron, here with plywood, but uniformly painted with golden ochre, cheerful in appearance».

Along with other types of ochre, golden ochre is traditionally widely used in tinting and painting ceramics.

== See also ==
- Ochre
- Attic ochre
- Ochre (disambiguation)
- Iron ochre
- Clay
- List of inorganic pigments
- List of colors
- Yellow
