= Miltiades (disambiguation) =

Miltiades the Younger (c. 550 – 489 BC) was tyrant of the Thracian Chersonese and the Athenian commanding general in the Battle of Marathon.

Miltiades may also refer to:

- Miltiades (name), a Greek given name (including a list of people with the name)
- 2663 Miltiades, main-belt asteroid discovered in 1960
- SS Miltiades, early 20th century steamship
