= Cobalt ochre =

Secondary cobalt minerals

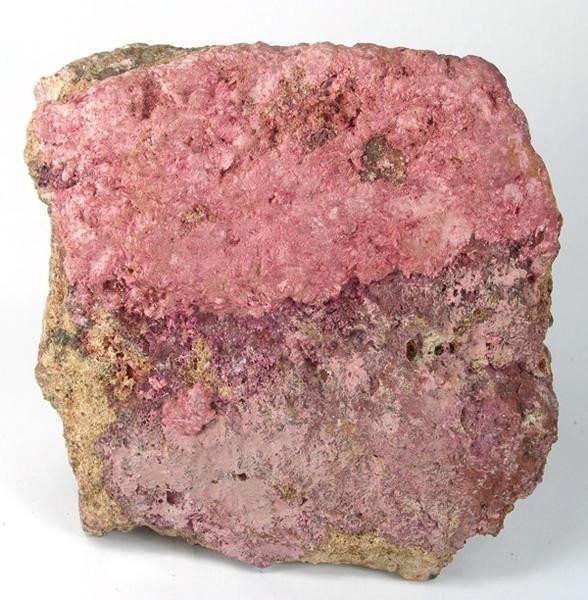
- Erythrite (Sonora, Mexico)

General
- Category: Minerals

Cobalt ochre, cobalt-ochre (Cobalt ocher in American English) or ochre of cobalt (German: Erdkobalt) — a common name that was widely used in mining and craft environments until the end of the 19th century for at least two cobalt-containing secondary ore minerals: asbolane and erythrite. They were often used with the addition of a clarifying color adjective or a clarifying mineral form adjective to avoid confusion.

== History ==
Meanwhile, at the beginning of the 19th century, the number of cobalt ochres looked much more impressive. For example, Robert Jameson, relying on numerous studies of his predecessors (from Werner to Haüy), divided cobalt ochres into four classes: black cobalt-ochres, brown cobalt-ochres, yellow cobalt-ochres and red cobalt-ochres. In turn, each of the color forms of ochre had two or three varieties. Black cobalt ochre had two main forms, which were widely distributed in the mines of Europe: earthy black cobalt-ochre and indurated black cobalt-ochre. Brown or yellow-brown cobalt-ochres varied in composition, sometimes being a mixture of black and yellow cobalt ochres. Yellow cobalt-ochres often appeared in association with various forms of red cobalt-ochres, as well as nickel ochres. Finally, red cobalt ochre was known in three mineral forms: earthy red cobalt-ochre, radiated red cobalt-ochre, and slaggy red cobalt-ochre.

At the same time, Jameson believed that cobalt ochres have a lot in common and can be classified as a special class of minerals. ″The Black, Brown and Yellow Cobalt Ochres, and other similar minerals, ought to be arranged together, and form a particular order by themselves. In the mean time, we place them beside the Red Cobalt, on account of their being often associated with that mineral″. However, from a chemical point of view, Jameson and his contemporaries reduced the entire diversity of cobalt ochres to two groups of chemical compounds of cobalt: oxides (asbolane) and arsenates (erythrite) in different morphological forms of crystallization and with a different set of impurities.

== Essential minerals ==
- Asbolane — a secondary mineral of the oxide class with the formula (Со,Ni)O•MnO_{2}•nH_{2}O, consisting of hydrous oxides of manganese, cobalt and nickel. Forms sooty, earthy masses (asbolan from the Ancient Greek: ασβολος — soot) of dirty colors from yellowish-brown to bluish-black.
- Erythrite — a secondary mineral of the arsenate class with the ideal formula Co_{3}(AsO_{4})_{2}•8(H_{2}O), consisting of cobalt(II) arsenate and usually also containing impurities of nickel, iron, zinc, magnesium and calcium. Due to its bright color, it is used as an indicator of nearby cobalt ores, and sometimes also native silver.

== Cobalt ochres gallery ==
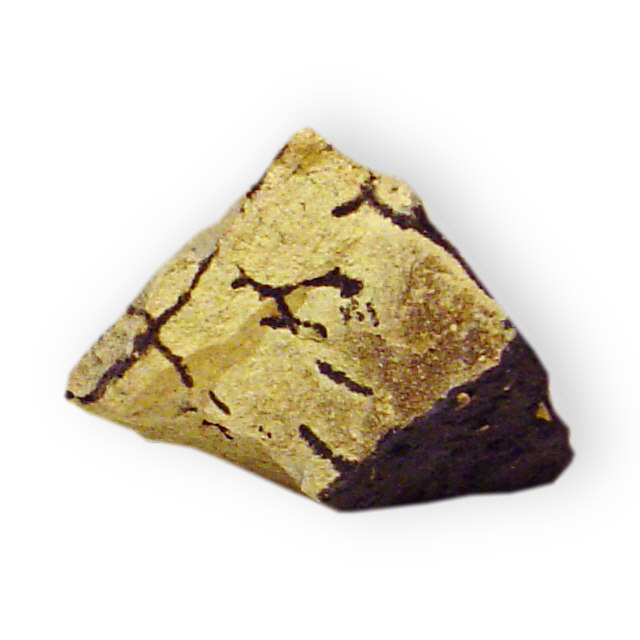
Asbolane

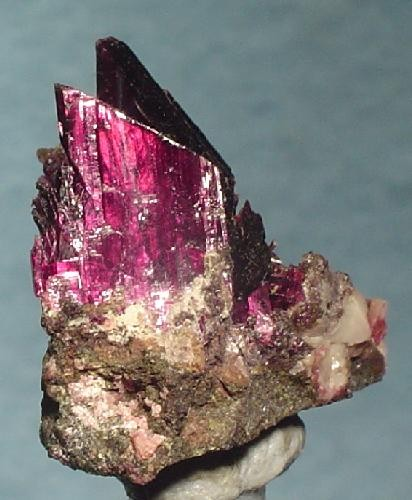
Erythrite

== See also ==
- Antimony ochre
- Attic ochre
- Golden ochre
- Iron ochre
- Lead ochre
