= Oger =

Oger may refer to:

- Ogre, Latvia
- Oger, Marne, France
- Saudi Oger, a Saudi construction company

== People with the name ==
=== Given name ===
- Oger Klos (born 1993), Dutch professional footballer

=== Surname ===
- Thomas Oger (born 1980), Monegasque tennis tour professional
- Vural Öger (born 1942), German politician and businessman
- Yves Oger (1951–2019), French Olympic rower

== See also ==
- Ogre (disambiguation)
