= Ogre (disambiguation) =

An ogre is a large, hideous monster of mythology, folklore and fiction.

Ogre may also refer to:

== Comics and manga ==
- Ogre (comics)
- Ogre (Marvel Comics), a Marvel Comics character, first appearing in X-Men in 1967
- Ogre (DC Comics), a DC Comics genetically-engineered character, first appearing in Batman in 1996
- O.G.R.E., acronym used by two fictional villain organizations in DC Comics' Aquaman
- Ogre (Rave Master), an antagonist in the Japanese manga/anime series

== Gaming ==
=== Game series ===
- Ogre Battle, a series of tactical role-playing video games

=== Game titles ===
- Ogre (board game), a tabletop wargame
  - Ogre (video game), a 1986 computer game released by Origin Systems, based on the tabletop wargame

=== Game elements ===
- Ogre (Dungeons & Dragons), a fictional monster found in the Dungeons & Dragons roleplaying game
- Ogre (Warhammer), a fictional race found in Warhammer Fantasy
- Ogre (Tekken), a character in the fighting game Tekken
- Ogre, a type of Darkspawn creature in the Dragon Age media franchise

=== Game engines ===
- OGRE, Object-Oriented Graphics Rendering Engine, a 3D graphics engine
- Open Gaming Resource Engine, a Doom source port by TeamTNT

== Films and television ==
- The Ogre, nickname of Frederick Palowakski, a character from the 1984 movie Revenge of the Nerds and sequels
- The Ogre (1989 film), a 1989 Italian horror film
- The Ogre (1996 film), a 1996 French drama
- Ogre (2008 film), a 2008 horror film directed by Steven R. Monroe
- Les Ogres, a 2015 French film

== Music ==
- Nivek Ogre (b. 1962), stage name of performer Kevin Ogilvie, singer of the band Skinny Puppy
  - ohGr, the intentionally misspelled name of Nivek Ogre's band after the demise of Skinny Puppy
- Ogre (band), an America heavy metal band
- Les Ogres de Barback, French musical group also known as Les Ogres

== Places ==
- Ogre Municipality, Latvia
  - Ogre, Latvia, principal town of the Ogre Municipality
  - Ogre River, river in Latvia
- The Ogre, nickname for Baintha Brakk, a mountain in the Karakoram range of the Himalaya in Pakistan

== Other ==
- Ogre, Ogre, fifth book of the Xanth series by Piers Anthony
- Ogre (magazine), an SF/fantasy magazine published 1979–1989
- Ogres (novella), a 2022 novella by Adrian Tchaikovsky

== See also ==
- Ochre (disambiguation)
- Oger (disambiguation)
- The Ogre (disambiguation)
- Wikipedia:WikiOgre
