= Attic ochre =

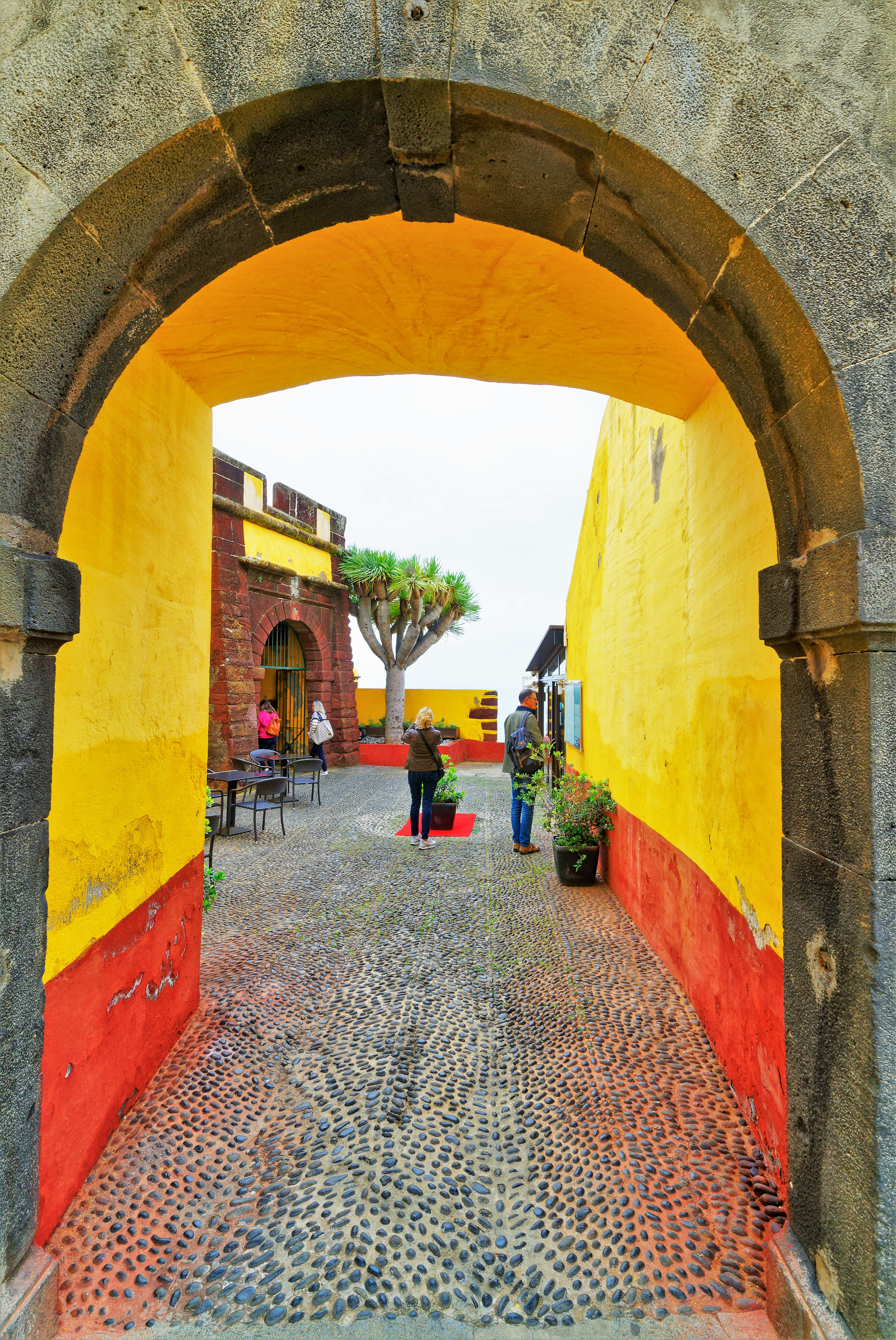
Fort of São Tiago attic ochre color

Attic ochre or attic yellow ocher (Latin: Sil atticum) — the historically known variety of ochre, which had a bright lemon yellow color, was considered the best and most expensive type of ochre in Ancient Greece and Rome. Attic ochre was used mainly for high-quality finishing work or decoration of household items. In painting, it was used to depict light, say, in contrast to achian ochre, which was used to paint shadows. This variety was mined in the immediate vicinity of Athens, from the ore veins of the silver mines near Koliada (Cape Koliada, Κωλιάδα άκρα), as well as in the Laurian silver mines.

Attic bright yellow clay was considered to be of particularly high quality; it was homogeneous, had no inclusions, and held the surface perfectly, even to the point of appearing a slight shine when smoothed, which made a favorable impression. Dioscorides in his treatise “On Medicinal Substances” recommended taking Attic ochre for medical use.

== History ==
The peak of Attic ochre production occurred in old Hellenic times. Already by the first century BC, this pigment was considered very rare in Rome, since the veins had been worked out to a large extent in the previous period. Marcus Vitruvius Pollio, in the seventh chapter (″Natural Colors″) of the seventh book of his architectural works, laments that “...the best Attic ochre is no longer available, because when there were slaves in the silver mines in Athens, they dug shafts underground in search of silver. Encountering a vein of ochre there, they tried to mine ochre along with silver; therefore the ancients had at their disposal excellent supplies of ochre for finishing their works.”

Pliny the Elder fully confirms his opinion in Natural History (book thirty-three). “The best ochre is the one called Attic; its price is 2 denarii per pound. The next one is marbled, the price is half that of the Attic one.”

== Use ==
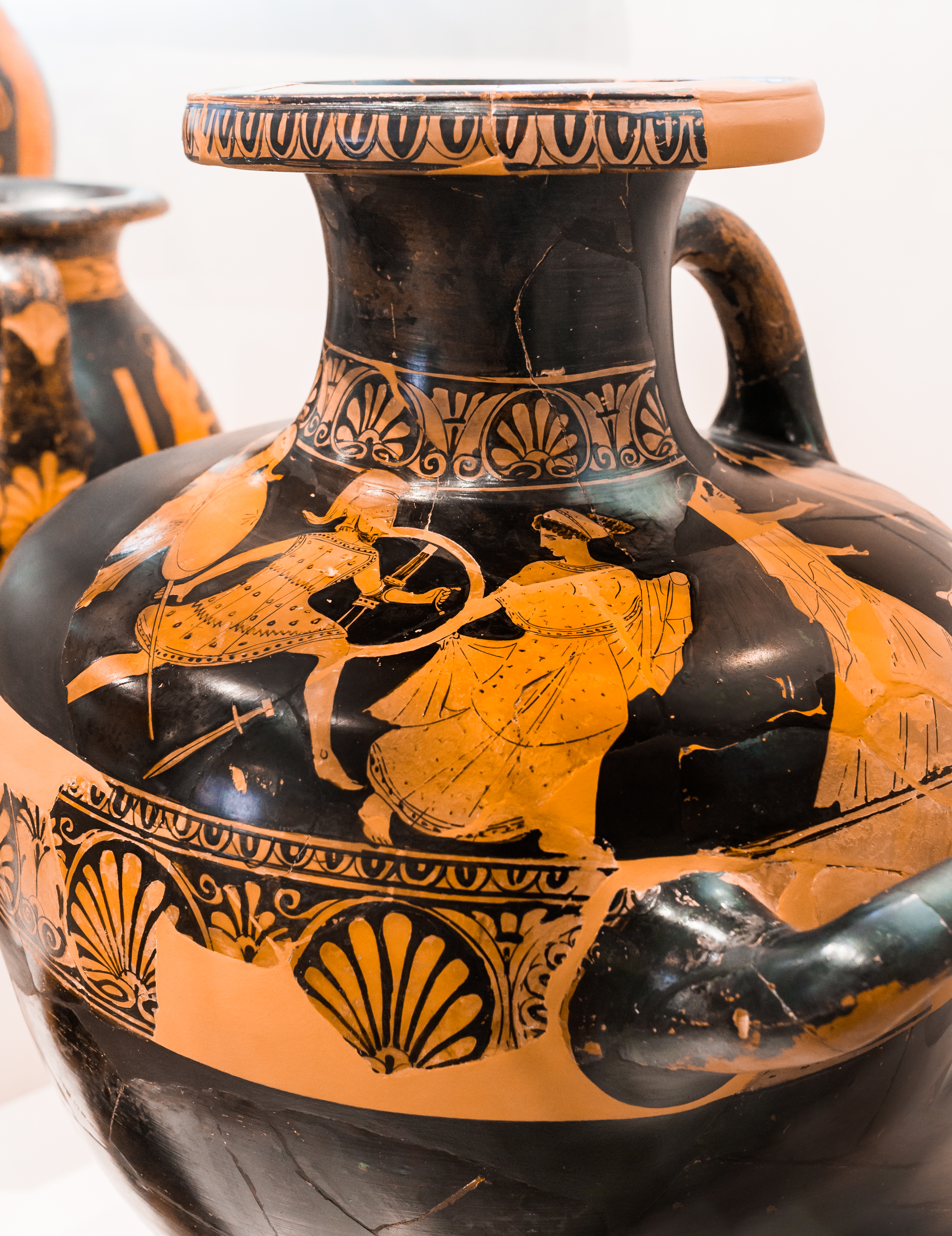
Menelaos pursuing Helena (Polygnotus)

First of all, Attic ochre was used for painting rooms and high-quality finishing works, as well as for decorating ceramics and household items. According to the same Pliny, Greek painters used six types of ochre. The best of them, the so-called Sil atticum, was used for those cases when it was necessary to depict light. It is believed that the introduction of Attic ochre into paintings began quite late, in the 1st century AD. It was first used in their works by the Greek painters Polygnotus and Micon, as well as Apelles, Echion, Melanthius and Nicomachus. They used only four colors (ochres) in their work, one of which was Attic ochre, which depicted light and the light parts of the picture.

The work of Polygnotus, which has been preserved more than others, allows us to judge the range of paints and pigments with which he worked. His palette, however, like other artists of that time, was quite limited. It included white (melinium), yellow (atticum, Attic ochre), red (sinopis pontica) and black (atramentum) paints. Of course, one cannot understand the evidence of antiquity to mean that only four colors are found in the works of Polygnotus. The four pigments mentioned above, when mixed with each other in different proportions, result in more than eight hundred different shades.

To this it should be added that in ancient times ochre remained the only or almost the only yellow pigment available. When composing yellow paint itself, ochre was often mixed with chalk or lime.

The high cost and lack of Attic ochre forced us to look for recipes for simulating its color using artificial means. Thus, in the last, fourteenth chapter of the same book (“Paints replacing crimson, ochre, mountain green and indigo”), Vitruvius describes one of the methods used by house painters to obtain the color of Attic ochre from boiled dried violets and chalk.

== Properties ==
Attic ochre is homogeneous and well-tanned, it has a provocatively bright light yellow color, reminiscent of the solar spectrum or even lighter. It is stable, does not fade in sunlight and does not decompose from exposure to atmospheric factors. However, this type of ochre should not be confused with Attic ceramics proper, which also had a reputation for high quality. Unlike the bright yellow ocher, Attic clay is light orange to reddish brown in color and often contains small mica sparkles.

Of the modern paints that are closer in tone to Attic ochre, one can name, first of all, golden ochre.

== See also ==
- Ochre
- Antimony ochre
- Golden ochre
- Ochre (disambiguation)
- Iron ochre
- Clay
- List of inorganic pigments
- List of colors
- Yellow
