= Ogre (comics) =

Ogre, in comics, may refer to:

- Marvel Comics characters:
  - Ogre (Marvel Comics), a Marvel Comics character, first appearing in X-Men in 1967
  - Fixer (Paul Norbert Ebersol), a Marvel character who disguised himself as Ogre to infiltrate the Thunderbolts
  - Ogress (comics), a Marvel supervillain and enemy of the Hulk
  - Ogre, a member of the Wicked Brigade
- DC Comics character and groups:
  - Ogre (DC Comics), a DC Comics genetically-engineered character, first appearing in Batman in 1996
  - O.G.R.E., acronym used by two fictional villain organizations in DC Comics' Aquaman
- Ogre (Rave Master), an antagonist in the Japanese manga/anime series
- OGRE, a comic book series from Source Point Press.

== See also ==
- Ogre (disambiguation)
