= Lead ochre =

Lead minerals and pigments resembling them

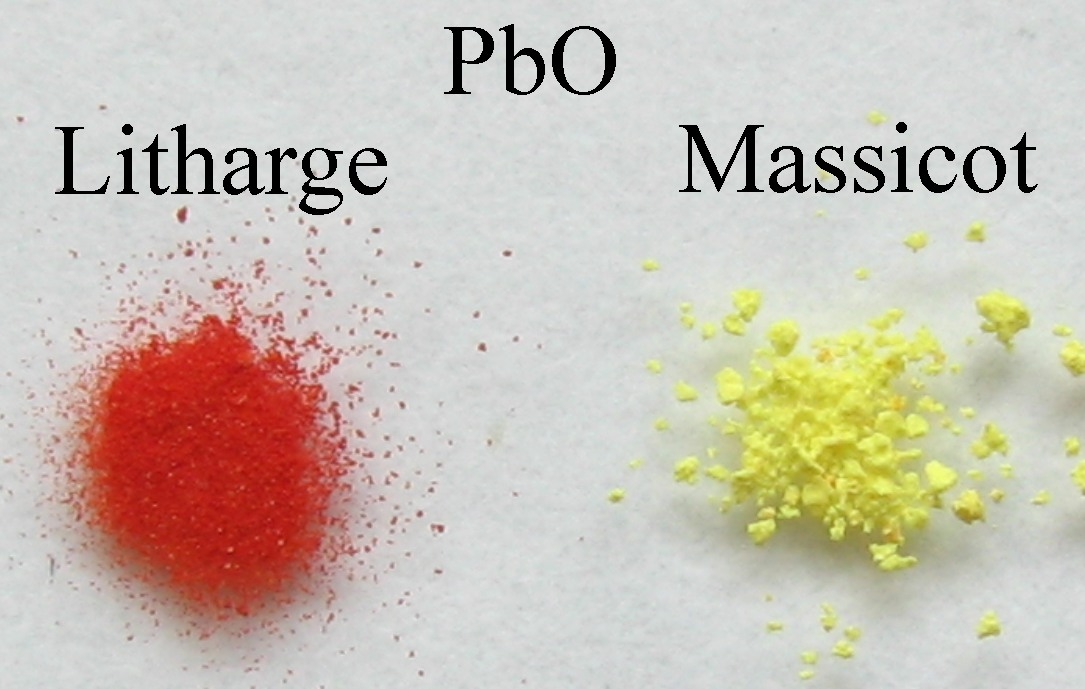
- Lead ochre in two powders

General
- Category: Minerals

Lead ochre or lead ocher in American English (German: bleiocker; from Ancient Greek ὤχρα ōkhrós 'pale yellow, orange'), as well as plumbic ocher or lead oxide — at least three lead minerals (pigments) that resemble ocher in appearance. Under such a trivial name, minerals and pigments of cream, yellow, orange and red colours were known, reminiscent of or corresponding to the powdery consistency of ochre. The term ″lead ochre″ was used primarily among glassblowers, artisans, as well as geologists and miners. It may refer to:

== Essential minerals ==
- massicot — β-PbO, stable at temperatures above 489°C, metastable at room temperature, yellow crystals, is a secondary mineral which forms from the oxidation of galena ores — a bright yellow pigment
- litharge — α-PbO, stable up to a temperature of 489°C, red crystals, is a secondary mineral which forms from the oxidation of galena ores — a bright orange pigment
- minium — Pb_{2}PbO_{4}, also known as red lead or red lead oxide — a bright orange red pigment

== Gallery ==
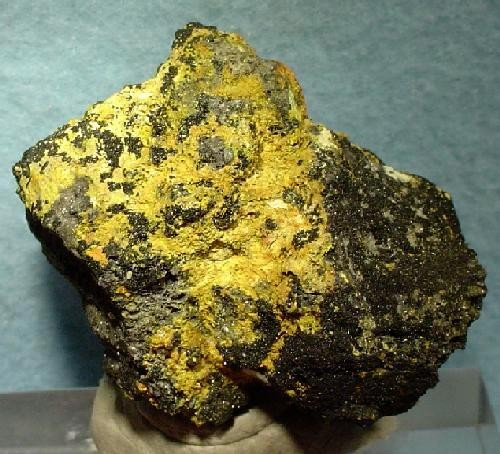
Massicot

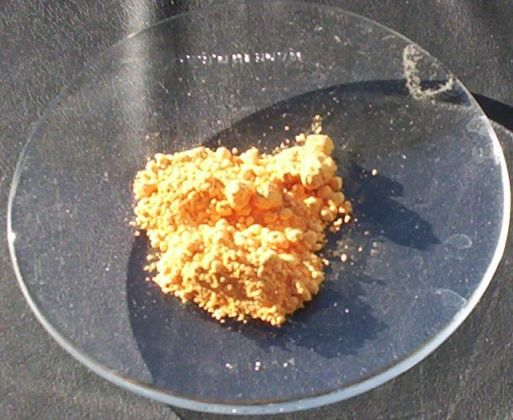
Massicot (pigment)

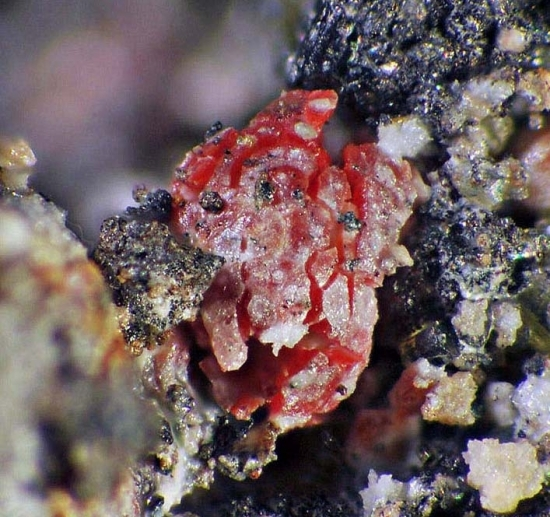
Litharge

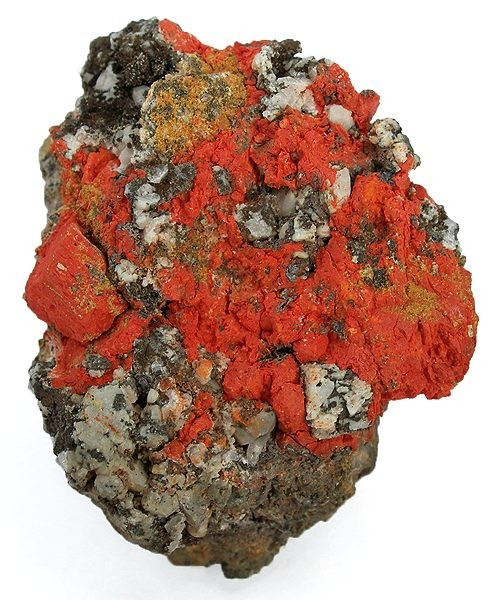
Minium (mineral)

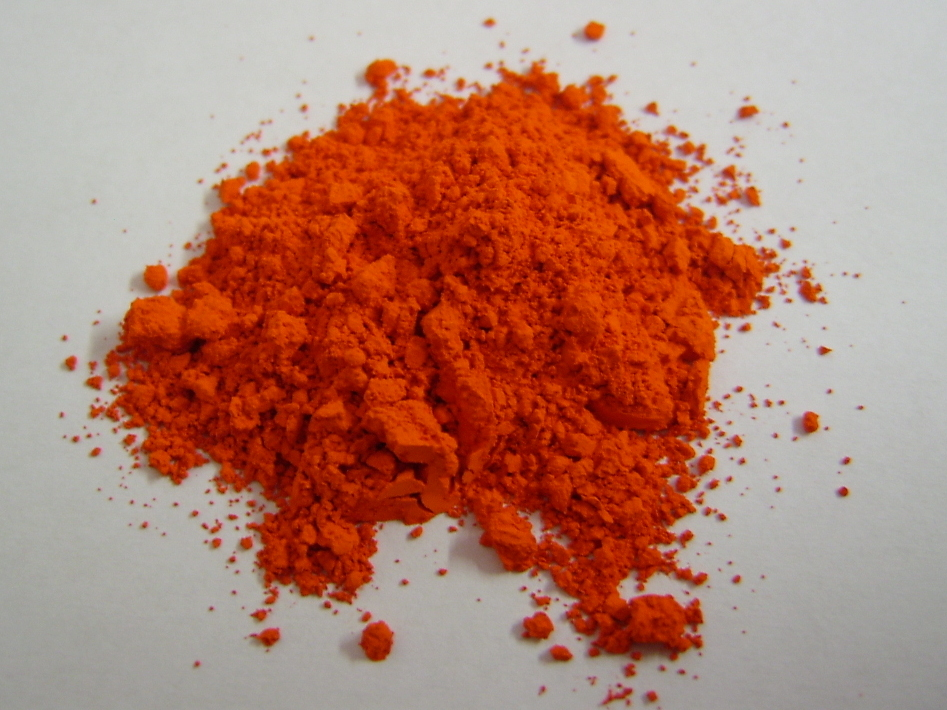
Minium (pigment)

== See also ==
- Ochre
- Ochre (disambiguation)
- Lead (disambiguation)
- Lead(II) oxide
- List of inorganic pigments
- List of colors
- Red pigments
- Antimony ochres
- Cobalt ochres
- Iron ochres
- Orange
- Yellow
