= Asbolane =

Manganese oxy-hydroxide mineral with traces of other metals

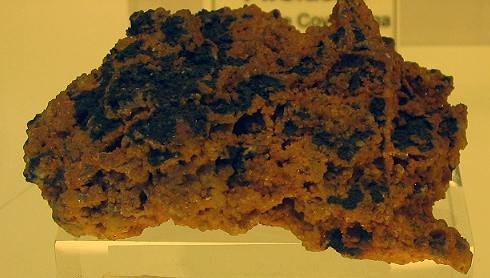
- Asbolane in its crystal form

General
- Category: Hydroxide mineral
- Formula: Mn^{4+}(O,OH)_{2}·(Co,Ni,Mg,Ca)_{x}(OH)_{2x}·nH_{2}O
- IMA symbol: Asb
- Crystal system: Hexagonal crystal system
- Colour: Black

Asbolane, previously cobalt ochre is a manganese (IV) oxy-hydroxide mineral containing also cobalt, nickel, magnesium, and calcium ions. It crystallizes in the hexagonal crystal system. Its chemical formula is Mn^{4+}(O,OH)_{2}·(Co,Ni,Mg,Ca)_{x}(OH)_{2x}·nH_{2}O.

== Naming ==
It is named after the Greek word for "soil like soot".
