= The Ogre =

The Ogre may refer to:

- Baintha Brakk, a mountain in the Karakoram range of the Himalayas nicknamed The Ogre
- The Ogre (1989 film), 1989 Italian horror film directed by Lamberto Bava
- The Erl-King (novel), a 1970 novel also published as The Ogre
  - The Ogre (1996 film), a 1996 film by Volker Schlöndorff based on the novel
- The Ogre (Idaho), a mountain in Idaho, United States
- The Ogre (オーガ, Ōga), referring to Yujiro Hanma from the anime and manga franchise Baki The Grappler

== See also ==
- Ogre (disambiguation)
