= Miltiades (name) =

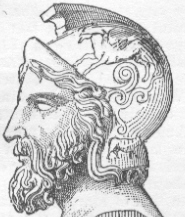
- Miltiades the Younger
- Gender: Male
- Language: Greek

Origin
- Meaning: Red earth

Other names
- Alternative spelling: Miltiadis
- Short form: Miltos

Miltiades or Miltiadis (Greek: Μιλτιάδης, short: Miltos) is a Greek masculine given name. The name is derived from the Greek word for "red earth".

People with the given name include:

- Miltiades the Younger (c. 550–489 BC), tyrant of the Thracian Chersonese and the Athenian commanding general in the Battle of Marathon
- Miltiades the Elder (died c. 524 BC), wealthy Athenian, and step-uncle of Miltiades the Younger
- Pope Miltiades (died 314), African saint and pope
- Miltiades Caridis (1923–1998), German-Greek conductor
- Miltiadis Evert (1939–2011), Greek politician
- Miltos Gkougkoulakis (born 1977), Greek footballer
- Miltiadis Goulimis (1844–1896), Greek politician
- Miltiadis Iatridis (1906–1960), Greek naval officer in World War II
- Miltiadis Manakis (1880–1964), one of the Manakis brothers, Aromanian pioneering photographer and filmmaker, aka Milton Manachia
- Miltos Papapostolou (1936–2017), Greek football manager
- Miltos Sachtouris (1919–2005), Greek poet
- Miltiadis Sapanis (born 1976), Greek footballer
- Miltiadis Tentoglou (born 1998), Greek long jump athlete and Olympic gold medalist
