= Miltos Gougoulakis =

Greek footballer (born 1977)

Personal information
- Full name: Miltiadis Gougoulakis
- Date of birth: 1 February 1977 (age 49)
- Place of birth: Athens, Greece
- Height: 1.87 m (6 ft 2 in)
- Position: Defender

Senior career*
Years	Team	Apps	(Gls)
1998–2003	Doxa Vyronas	29	(1)
2003–2005	Egaleo	10	(0)
2005–2006	Haidari	18	(0)
2007	Olympiakos Nea Liosia		
2007–2008	Aiolikos	21	(0)
2008–2009	Keratea		
2009	Haidari		
2009–2010	Saronikos Aegina		
2010	A.O. Dikaio		
2009–2010	A.E. Kos		
- * Club domestic league appearances and goals

Miltos Gougoulakis (born 1 February 1977 in Athens) is a Greek former football player who played as a defender.

Gougoulakis played for Egaleo in the Super League Greece during the 2003–04 season.
