= Miltiadis Goulimis =

Greek politician

Miltiadis Goulimis (Greek: Μιλτιάδης Γουλιμής) (c. 1844–1896) was a Greek politician from Missolonghi. In the Greek elections on April 16, 1895, he defeated the former Prime Minister Charilaos Trikoupis and won the regional seat, leaving Trikoupis out of the Hellenic Parliament.
