= Ochre =

Earth pigment of characteristic colour

Ochre (Ocher)

Colour coordinates
- Hex triplet: #CC7722
- sRGB^{B} (r, g, b): (204, 119, 34)
- HSV (h, s, v): (30°, 83%, 80%)
- CIELCh_{uv} (L, C, h): (58, 87, 37°)
- Source: colorxs.com/color
- ISCC–NBS descriptor: Deep orange
- B: Normalized to [0–255] (byte)

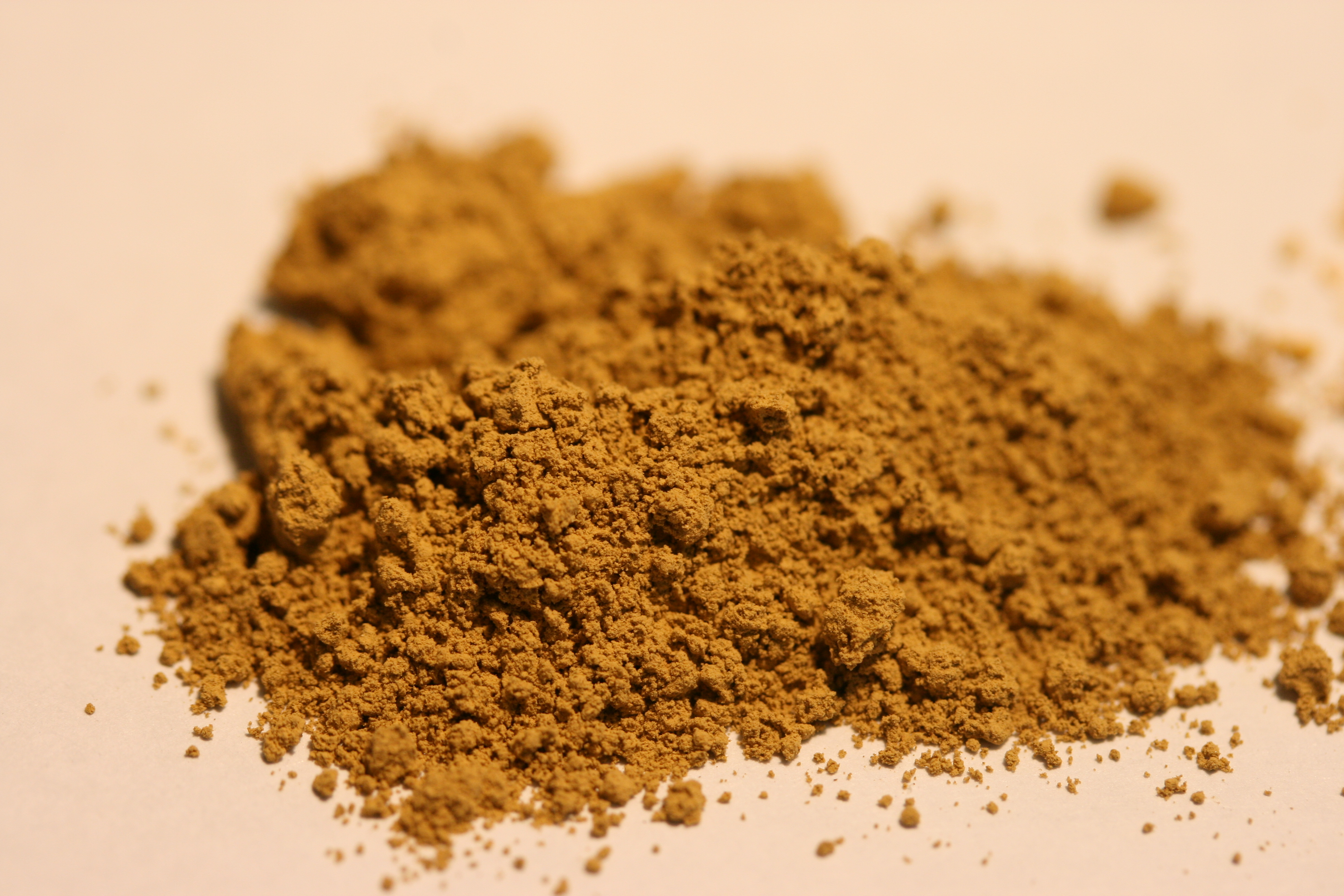
Ochre pigment

Ochre (/ˈoʊkər/ OH-kər; from Ancient Greek ὤχρα (ṓkhra) 'yellow ochre', from ὠχρός (ōkhrós) 'pale, yellow') is a family of natural clay earth pigments, made up of ferric oxide and varying amounts of clay and sand, ranging in colour from yellow to deep orange or brown. The term is also used for the colours produced by this pigment, especially a light brownish-yellow. A variant of ochre containing a large amount of hematite, or dehydrated iron oxide, has a reddish tint known as red ochre (or, in some dialects in England, ruddle). The term "ochre" is colloquially used to cover a range of different substances used for their colours in Aboriginal Australian art and ceremonial decoration, for instance the clay known as "white ochre" or "pipe clay" is derived from kaolin or gypsum.

== Terminology ==
Ochre (sometimes "ocher" in American English,) is a natural clay earth pigment, consisting of a mixture of ferric oxide and varying amounts of clay and sand. The family of earth pigments known as ochre includes yellow ochre, red ochre, purple ochre, sienna, and umber. The major ingredient of all the ochres is iron(III) oxide-hydroxide, known as limonite, which gives them a yellow colour. A range of other minerals may also be included in the mixture:

The clays coloured with iron oxide derived during the extraction of tin and copper may also be known as ochre.

The term is also used for the colours produced by this pigment, especially a light brownish-yellow. The range of colours include:

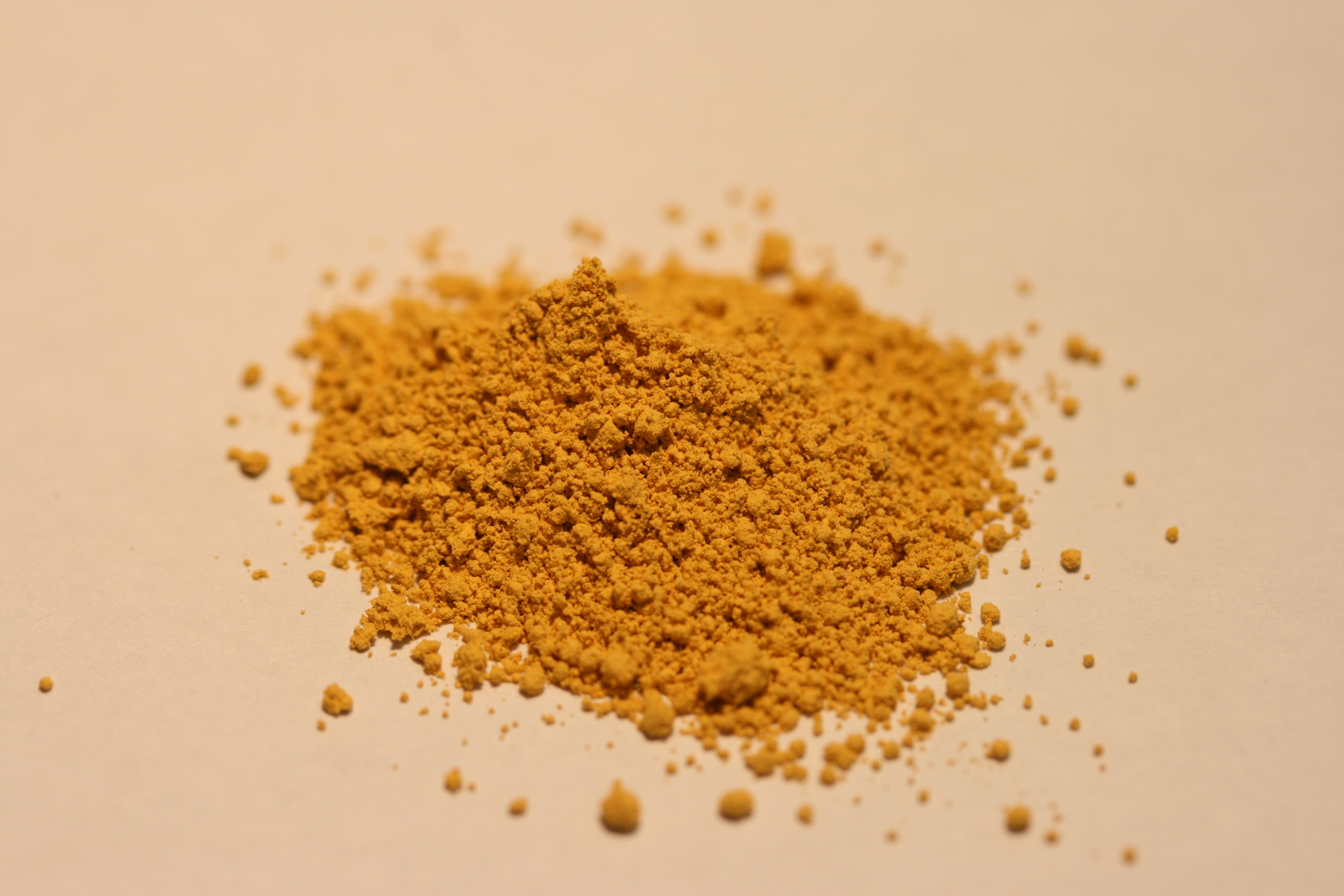
Yellow ochre (Goldochre) pigment

- Yellow ochre, FeO(OH)·nH_{2}O - hydrated iron(III) oxyhydroxide (limonite) also called gold ochre.
- Red ochre, Fe_{2}O_{3}·nH_{2}O, takes its reddish colour from the mineral hematite, which is an iron oxide, reddish brown when hydrated.
- Purple ochre is a rare variant identical to red ochre chemically but of a different hue caused by different light diffraction properties associated with a greater average particle size.
- Brown ochre, also FeO(OH), (goethite), is a partly hydrated iron oxide. Similarly, lepidocrocite — γ-FeO(OH), a secondary mineral, a product of the oxidation of iron ore minerals, found in brown iron ores
- Sienna contains both limonite and a small amount of manganese oxide (less than 5%), which makes it darker than ochre.
- Umber pigments contain a larger proportion of manganese (5-20%), which makes them a dark brown.

== Historical use in art and culture ==
=== Prehistory ===
Selected sites with prehistoric ochre use in Africa between 500,000 and 40,000 years BP from the ROAD database (CC BY-SA 4.0 ROCEEH / Dapschauskas et al. 2022)

Over recent decades, red ochre has played a pivotal role in discussions about the cognitive and cultural evolution of early modern humans during the African Middle Stone Age. In Africa, evidence for the processing and use of red ochre pigments has been dated by archaeologists to around 300,000 years ago, the climax of the practice coinciding broadly with the emergence of Homo sapiens. Evidence of ochre's use in Australia is more recent, dated to 50,000 years ago, while new research has uncovered evidence in Asia that is dated to 40,000 years ago.

Archeological evidence highlights that prehistoric populations picked different ochre specifically based on certain qualities such as their colour, texture, and even hardness. In parts of Southern Africa deep red-iron ochres were transported over very long distances even though there was evidence of local deposits, implying that each different pigment had a unique cultural or ritual importance to the people. The specific and purposeful movement of the ochre suggest there were many early long-distance exchange networks among the Middle Stone Age groups (Watts 2002).

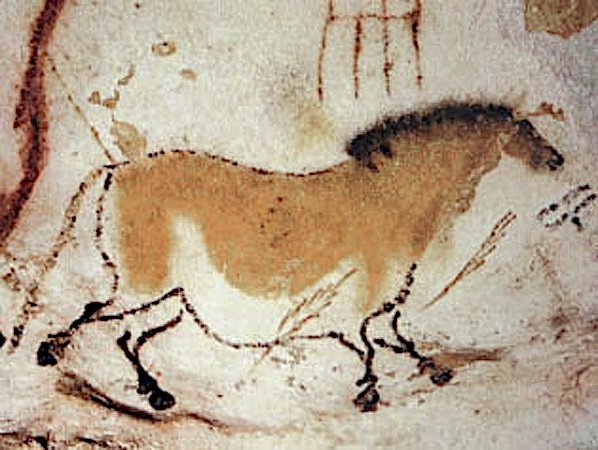
Image of a horse coloured with yellow ochre (17,300 BC) from Lascaux cave, France

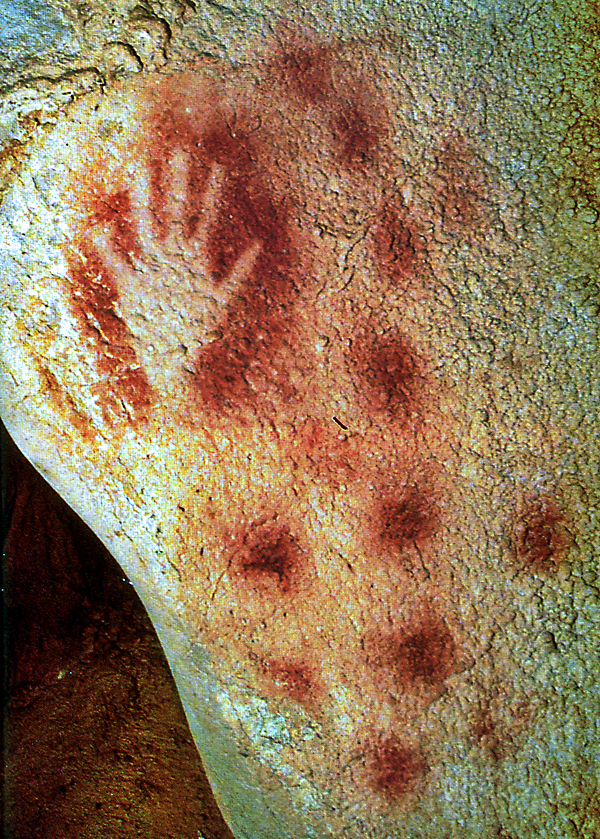
Image of a human hand created with red ochre in Pech Merle cave, France (Gravettian era, 25,000 BC)

A re-examination of artefacts uncovered in 1908 at Le Moustier rock shelters in France has identified Mousterian stone tools that were attached to grips made of ochre and bitumen. The grips were formulated with 55% ground goethite ochre and 45% cooked liquid bitumen to create a mouldable putty that hardened into handles. Earlier excavations at Le Moustier prevent conclusive identification of the archaeological culture and age, but the European Mousterian style of these tools suggests they are associated with Neanderthals during the late Middle Paleolithic, between 60,000 and 35,000 years before present. It is the earliest evidence of compound adhesive use in Europe.

Pieces of ochre engraved with abstract designs have been found at the site of the Blombos Cave in South Africa, dated to around 75,000 years ago. "Mungo Man" (LM3) in Australia was buried sprinkled with red ochre around 40,000 years ago. In Wales, the Paleolithic burial called the Red Lady of Paviland from its coating of red ochre has been dated to around 33,000 years before present. Paintings of animals made with red and yellow ochre pigments have been found in Paleolithic sites at Pech Merle in France (ca. 25,000 years old), and the cave of Altamira in Spain (c. 16,500–15,000 BC). The cave of Lascaux has an image of a horse coloured with yellow ochre estimated to be 17,300 years old. Neolithic burials may have used red ochre pigments symbolically, either to represent a return to the earth or possibly as a form of ritual rebirth, in which the colour may symbolise blood and a hypothesised Great Goddess.

The use of ochre is particularly intensive: it is not unusual to find a layer of the cave floor impregnated with a purplish red to a depth of eight inches. The size of these ochre deposits raises a problem not yet solved. The colouring is so intense that practically all the loose ground seems to consist of ochre. One can imagine that the Aurignacians regularly painted their bodies red, dyed their animal skins, coated their weapons, and sprinkled the ground of their dwellings, and that a paste of ochre was used for decorative purposes in every phase of their domestic life. We must assume no less, if we are to account for the veritable mines of ochre on which some of them lived...

— Leroi-Gourhan, A. 1968. The Art of Prehistoric Man in Western Europe. London: Thames & Hudson, p. 40.

The Gothic historian Jordanes claimed that the ancient Caledonians painted themselves "Iron Red", "whether by way of adornment or perhaps for some other reason".

Ochre has uses other than as paint: "tribal peoples alive today . . . use either as a way to treat animal skins or else as an insect repellent, to staunch bleeding, or as protection from the sun. Ochre may have been the first medicament."

=== Ancient Egypt ===
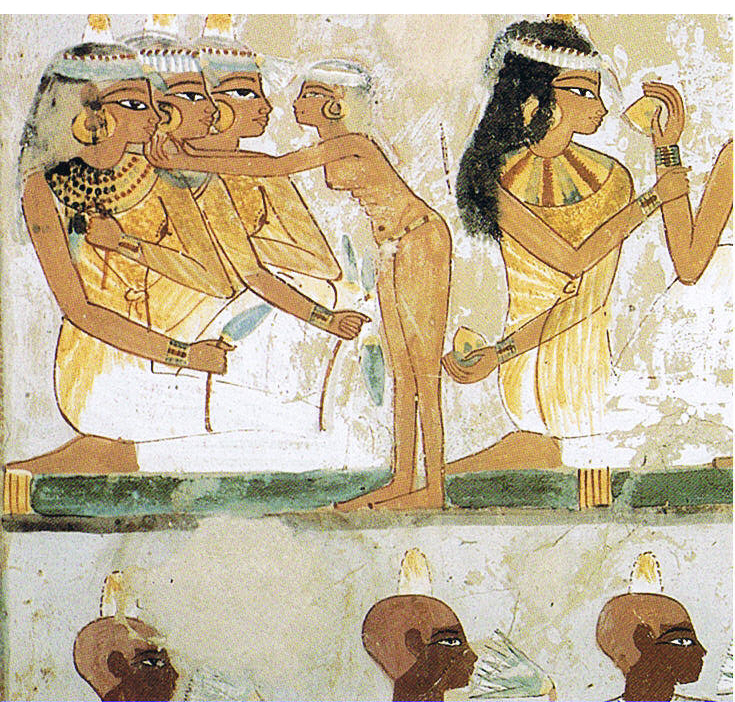
Ochre paintings in the Tomb of Nakht in Ancient Egypt (15th century BC).

In Ancient Egypt, yellow was associated with gold, which was considered to be eternal and indestructible. The skin and bones of the gods were believed to be made of gold. The Egyptians used yellow ochre extensively in tomb painting, though occasionally they used orpiment, which made a brilliant colour, but was highly toxic, since it was made with arsenic. In tomb paintings, men were always shown with brown faces, women with yellow ochre or gold faces.

Red ochre in Ancient Egypt was used as a rouge, or lip gloss for women. Ochre-coloured lines were also discovered on the Unfinished obelisk at the northern region of the Aswan Stone Quarry, marking work sites. Ochre clays were also used medicinally in Ancient Egypt: such use is described in the Ebers Papyrus from Egypt, dating to about 1550 BC.

=== Ancient Phoenicia ===
Pigments, particularly red ochre, were essential to grave rituals in ancient Phoenician society. They were more than just cosmetics; they also had important symbolic and ritualistic connotations. With its vivid colour that was evocative of blood and energy, red ochre represented life, death, and rebirth. It also represented the desire for resurrection and the belief in an afterlife. In order to honor the deceased and get them ready for their passage to the afterlife, these pigments, particularly red ochre, were most likely applied to their body or other grave goods as part of the burial rites. “Phoenicians' love of red is highlighted by the great number of powders of this colour found in the containers. The powders were probably used to give a hue to cheeks or to lips. Besides these uses as make-up powders, we can also assume a ritual use of ointments and powders containing cinnabar or ochre, applied to the face and the forehead during preparation rituals of the bodies. The discovery of red paint traces on bones and skulls suggests that these practices were common among the Phoenicians as for other populations.” Greater-quality pigments and more intricate applications would typically indicate people of greater rank or particular significance within the community. Moreover, the presence and quality of pigments in a burial site may indicate the identity or social standing of the deceased. In addition to acting as offerings to the gods and protective symbols, pigments were employed to adorn grave goods including pottery, amulets, and other objects, so elevating the spiritual purity of the interment. The visual impact of red ochre could also have been intended to preserve the appearance of the body or make it presentable for mourning ceremonies, ensuring that the deceased was honored appropriately. This vivid colour would enhance the overall visual and emotional impact of funerary displays. In essence, the use of red ochre and other pigments in Phoenician funerary contexts highlights their cultural and symbolic importance, reflecting deep-seated beliefs about death, the afterlife, and social hierarchy, thus providing a richer understanding of Phoenician customs and values.

=== Ancient Greece and Rome ===
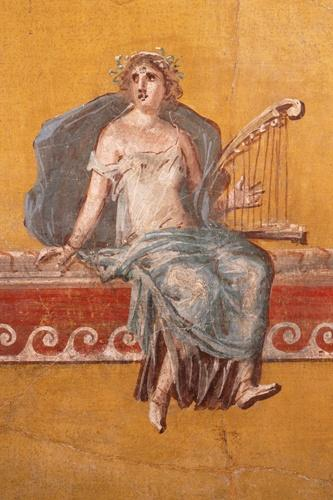
Yellow ochre was often used for wall paintings in Ancient Roman villas and towns.

Ochre was the most commonly used pigment for painting walls in the ancient Mediterranean world. In Ancient Greece, red ochre was called μίλτος, míltos (hence Miltiades: "red-haired" or "ruddy"). In ancient Athens when Assembly was called, a contingent of public slaves would sweep the open space of the Agora with ropes dipped in miltos: those citizens that loitered there instead of moving to the Assembly area would risk having their clothes stained with the paint. This prevented them from wearing these clothes in public again, as failure to attend the Assembly incurred a fine.

In England, red ochre was also known as "raddle", "reddle", or "ruddle" and was used to mark sheep and can also be used as a waxy waterproof coating on structures. The reddle was sold as a ready-made mixture to farmers and herders by travelling workers called reddlemen.

In Classical antiquity, the finest red ochre came from a Greek colony on the Black Sea where the modern city of Sinop in Turkey is located. It was carefully regulated, expensive and marked by a special seal, and this colour was called sealed Sinope. Later the Latin and Italian name sinopia was given to wide range of dark red ochre pigments. Roman triumphators painted their faces red, perhaps to imitate the red-painted flesh of statues of the Gods. The Romans used yellow ochre in their paintings to represent gold and skin tones, and as a background colour. It is found frequently in the murals of Pompeii.

=== New Zealand ===
The Māori people of New Zealand made extensive use of mineral ochre mixed with fish oil. Red ochre was known as Kōkōwai, and was highly sought after. Other colours, including orange, yellow, and brown were also used, and the ochre was mixed with fish oil to make a paste to smear over their bodies. One of Captain Cook's crew members was recorded as saying: "They paint their faces with a coarse red paint, and oil or grease the head and upper part of the body". After European settlement of New Zealand, the Māori stopped using kōkōwai on their bodies, but continued to use it for decoration and preservation of wooden canoes known as waka, as well as buildings and tombs. The combination of kokowai and shark oil repelled sandflies, and was believed to keep away the patupaiarehe (supernatural beings), and the colour was regarded as sacred.

They also used it as a dye, sometimes using it to dye a cloak known as the korowai, and in their hair.

The main ochre deposits were at Parapara in Golden Bay / Mohua, which brought European enterprise to the area in the 1870s. The Washbourn family founded the New Zealand Haematite Paint Company, using the ochres as high-quality pigment. The Nelson Paint Company was the last to extract pigment from the site, in 1930.

=== Indigenous North America ===
In Newfoundland its use is most often associated with the Beothuk, whose use of red ochre led them to be referred to as "Red Indians" by the first Europeans to Newfoundland. The Beothuk may have also used yellow ochre to colour their hair. It was also used by the Maritime Archaic as evidenced by its discovery in the graves of over 100 individuals during an archaeological excavation at Port au Choix. Its use was widespread at times in the Eastern Woodlands cultural area of Canada and the US; the Red Ocher people complex refers to a specific archaeological period in the Woodlands c. 1000–400 BC. California Native Americans such as the Tongva and Chumash were also known to use red ochre as body paint. Researchers diving into dark submerged caves on Mexico's Yucatán Peninsula have found evidence of an ambitious mining operation starting 12,000 years ago and lasting two millennia for red ochre.

=== Renaissance ===
During the Renaissance, yellow and red ochre pigments were widely used in painting panels and frescoes. The colours vary greatly from region to region, depending upon whether the local clay was richer in yellowish limonite or reddish hematite. The red earth from Pozzuoli near Naples was a salmon pink, while the pigment from Tuscany contained manganese, making it a darker reddish brown called terra di siena, or sienna earth.

The 15th-century painter Cennino Cennini described the uses of ochre pigments in his famous treatise on painting.

This pigment is found in the earth of mountains, where particular seams like sulphur are found. And there, where these seams are, sinopia, green earth and other types of pigment are found...And the abovementioned pigments running through this landscape looked as a scar on the face of a man or of a woman looks...I went in behind with my little knife, prospecting at the scar of this pigment; and in this way, I promise you, I never sampled a more lovely and perfect ochre pigment...And know that this ochre is a common pigment, particularly when working in fresco; that with other mixtures that, as i will explain to you, it is used for flesh colours, for drapery, for coloured mountains and buildings and hair and in general for many things.

In early modern Malta, red ochre paint was commonly used on public buildings.

=== Colonial North America ===
In Newfoundland, red ochre was the pigment of choice for use in vernacular outbuildings and work buildings associated with the cod fishery. Deposits of ochre are found throughout Newfoundland, notably near Fortune Harbour and at Ochre Pit Cove. While earliest settlers may have used locally collected ochre, people were later able to purchase pre-ground ochre through local merchants, largely imported from England.

The dry ingredient, ochre, was mixed with some type of liquid raw material to create a rough paint. The liquid material was usually seal oil or cod liver oil in Newfoundland and Labrador, while Scandinavian recipes sometimes called for linseed oil. Red ochre paint was sometimes prepared months in advance and allowed to sit, and the smell of ochre paint being prepared is still remembered today.

Variations in local recipes, shades of ore, and type of oil used resulted in regional variations in colour. Because of this, it is difficult to pinpoint an exact shade or hue of red that would be considered the traditional "fishing stage red". In the Bonavista Bay area one man maintained that seal oil mixed with the ochre gave the sails a purer red colour, while cod liver oil would give a "foxy" colour, browner in hue.

== Past and continuing use ==
=== Africa ===
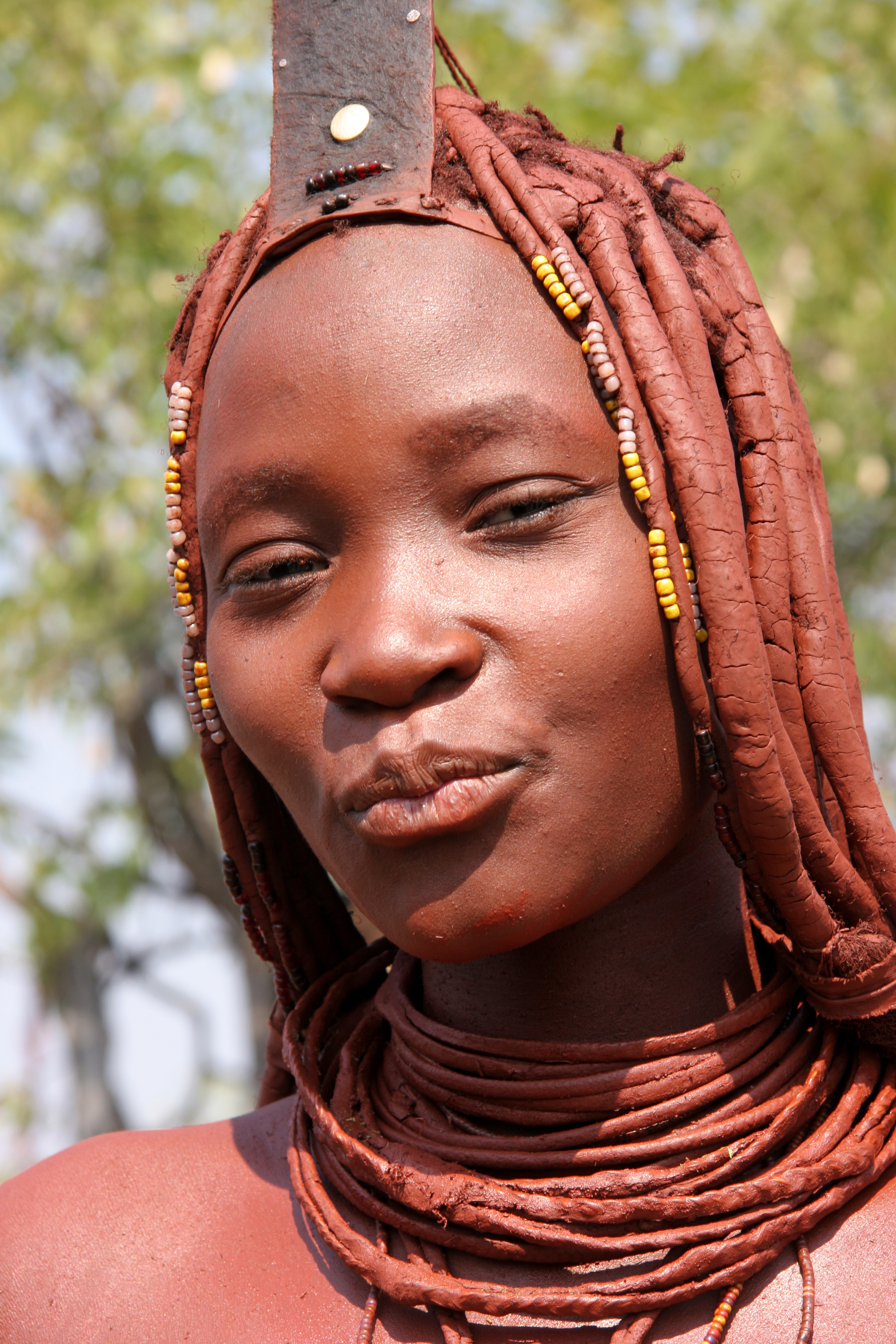
Himba woman covered with a traditional ochre pigment

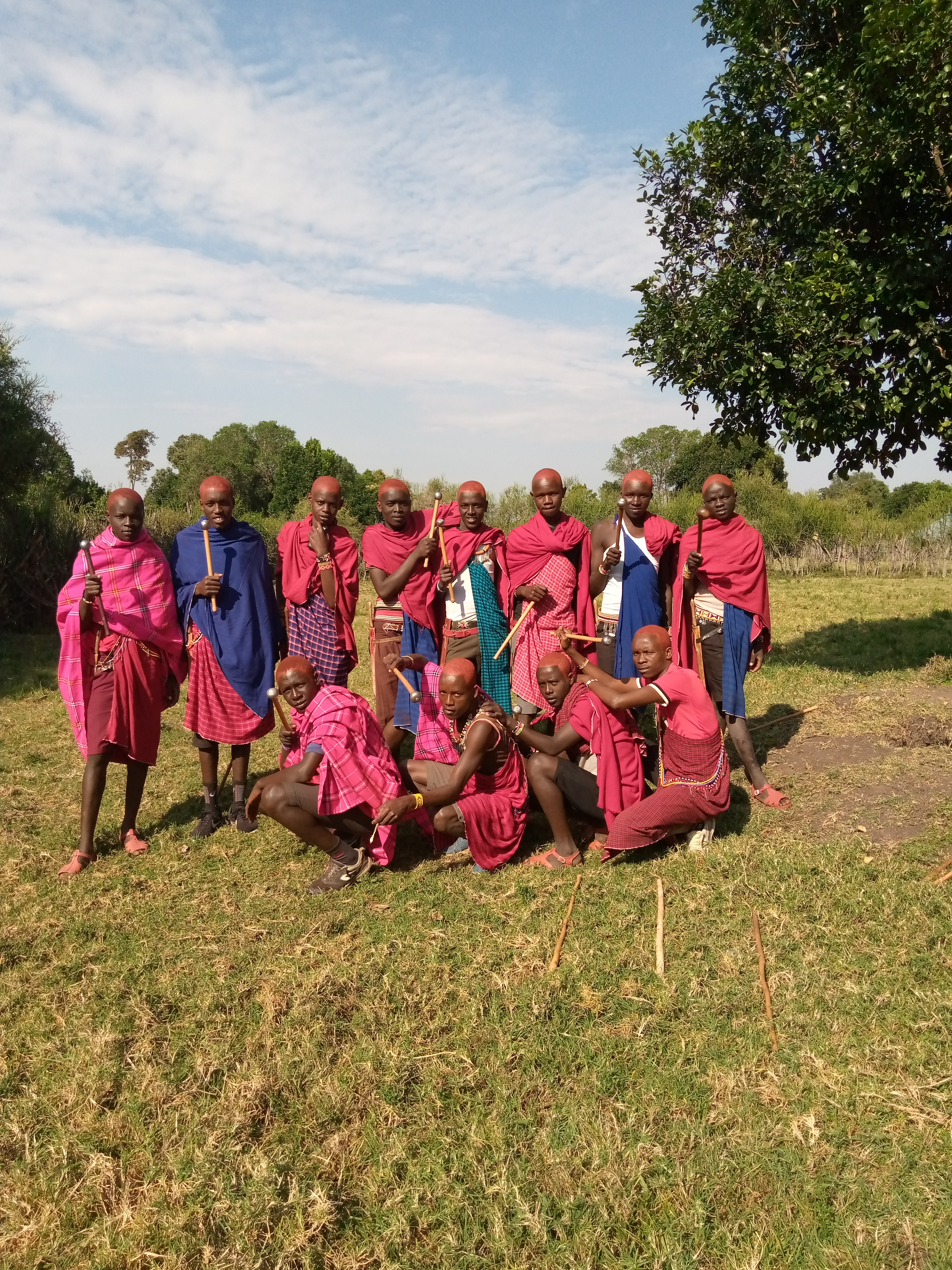
Maasai Morans heads covered with traditional ochre pigment

Red ochre has been used as a colouring agent in Africa for over 200,000 years. Women of the Himba ethnic group in Namibia use a mix of ochre and animal fat for body decoration, to achieve a reddish skin colour. The ochre mixture is also applied to their hair after braiding. Men and women of the Maasai people in Kenya and Tanzania have also used ochre in the same way.

=== Australia ===
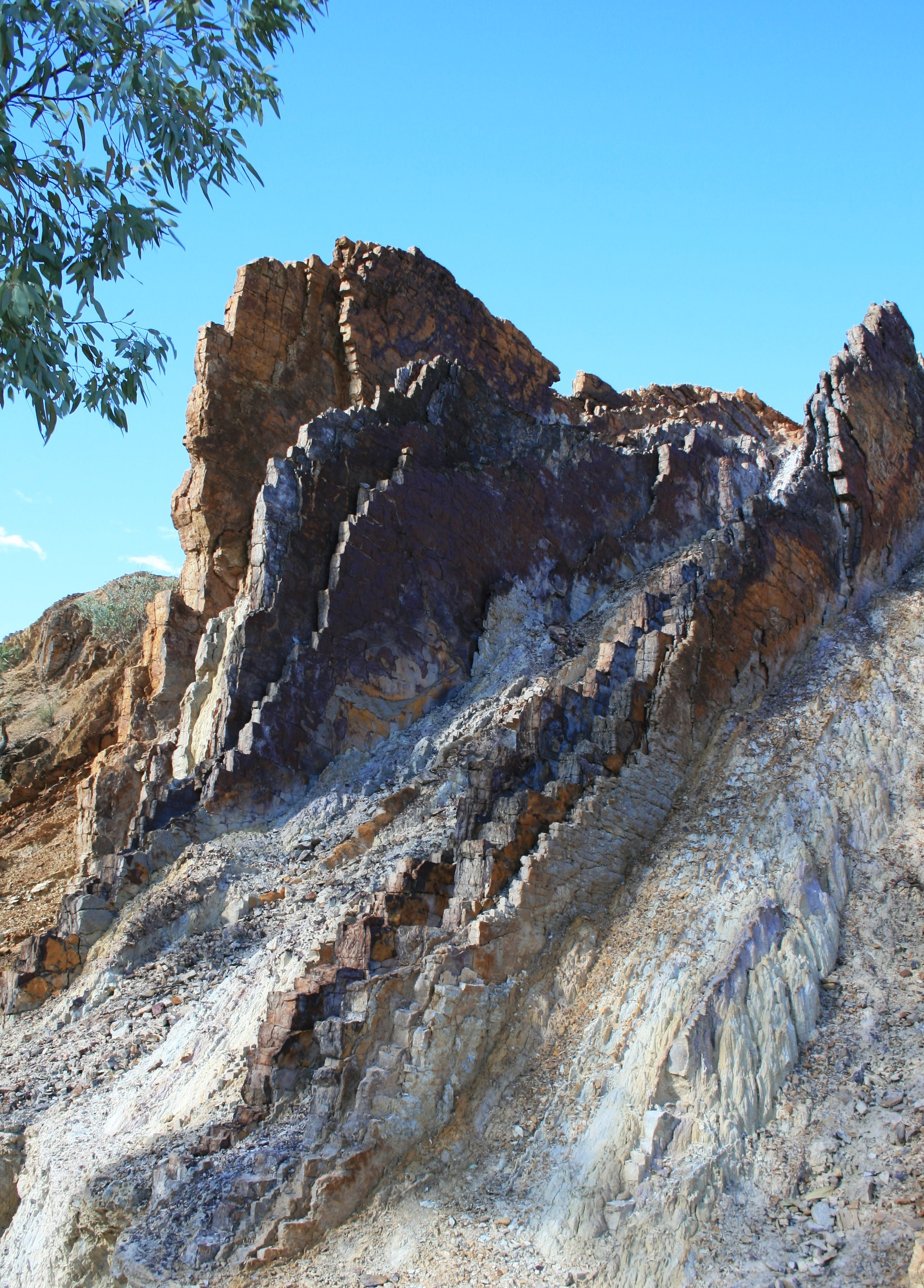
Ochre Pits, Namatjira Drive, Northern Territory

Ochre pigments are plentiful across Australia, especially the Western Desert, Kimberley, and Arnhem Land regions, and occur in many archaeological sites. The practice of ochre painting has been prevalent among Aboriginal Australians for over 40,000 years. Pleistocene burials with red ochre date as early as 40,000 BP and ochre plays a role in expressing symbolic ideologies of the earliest arrivals to the continent. Ochre has been used for millennia by Aboriginal people for body decoration, sun protection, mortuary practices, cave painting, bark painting and other artwork, and the preservation of animal skins, among other uses. At Lake Mungo, in Western New South Wales, burial sites have been excavated and burial materials, including ochre-painted bones, have been dated to the arrival of people in Australia; "Mungo Man" (LM3) was buried sprinkled with red ochre at least 30,000 BP, and possibly as early as 60,000 BP.

Ochre has been mined by Aboriginal people in pits and quarries across Australia; there are over 400 recorded sites, and many of these (including the Ochre Pits in the Tjoritja / West MacDonnell National Park) are still in use. The National Museum of Australia has a large collection of ochre samples from many sites across Australia.

Ochre was traded across the continent through the network of ancient songlines, with highly prized red ochre being sourced from spiritually significant places.

The Yirrkala Bark Petitions, "one of the most significant actions by Aboriginal people in modern history", sent to the Australian Parliament by the Yolngu people of North East Arnhem Land in the Northern Territory in 1963 to negotiate land rights, were decorated with traditional ochre designs.

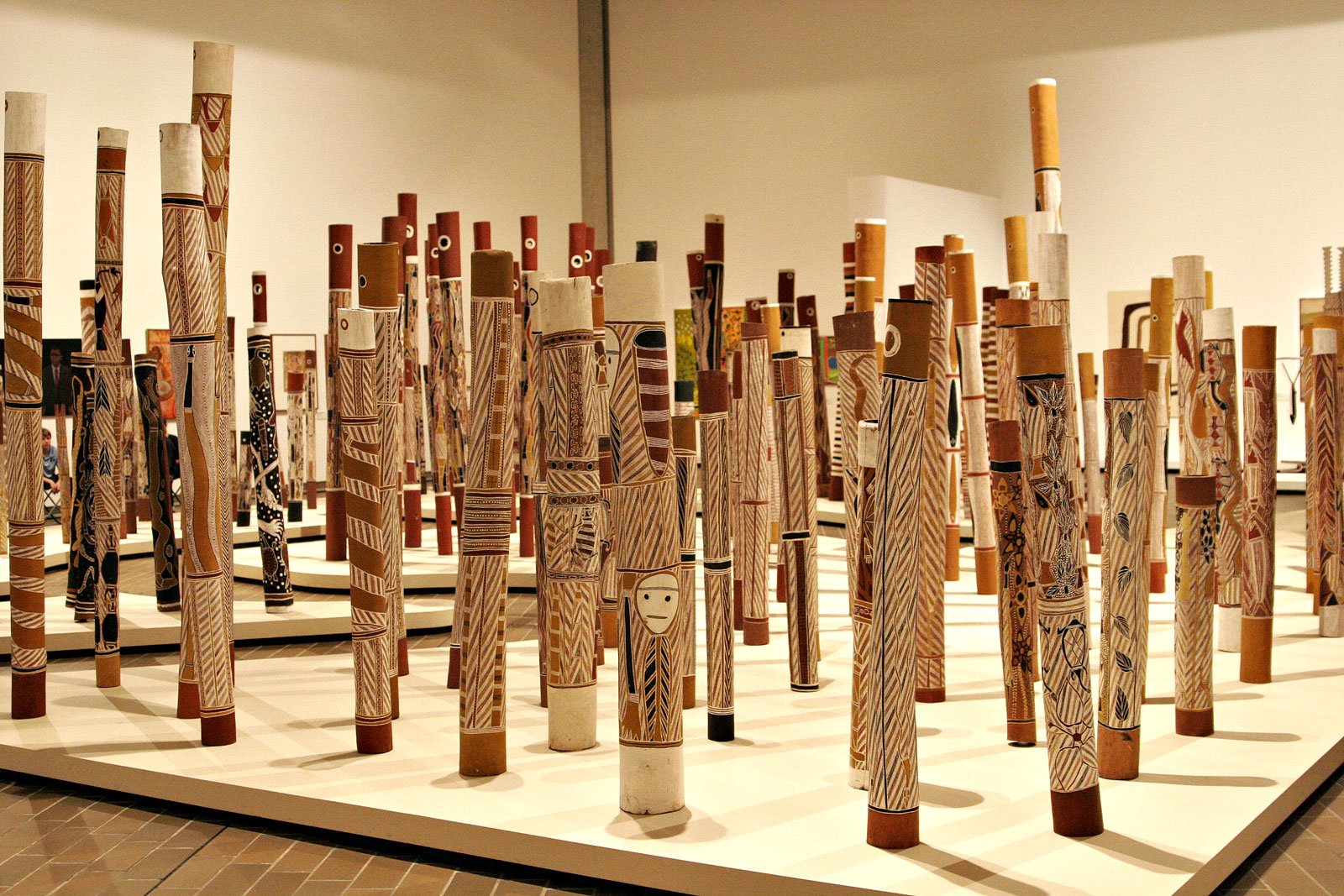
Memorial poles decorated with ochre

In Australia, the term "ochre" is applied to a range of coloured substances used in art and decoration in ceremonial activities, some of which are chemically different (and all have different names in different Australian Aboriginal languages). Ochres continue to be used in Aboriginal art and for ceremonial decoration. The most common colours are red, yellow, white, and black, but other colours such as orange, purple, pink and turquoise are also used. Different colours are associated with specific meanings and uses, for example white is often used during times of "sorry business" and loss, while black pigment (from coal or charcoal) is mainly used for men's business. Patterns drawn on the skin with ochre are specific to a purpose, and regarded as the cultural property of each clan. The clay known as "white ochre", "pipe clay", or "china clay" is derived from kaolinite or gypsum.

Indigenous dance company Bangarra Dance Theatre uses ochre extensively in its performances. It sources its white ochre from the Nuwal ochre pit in Yirrkala, Arnhem Land.

Ochre has been and still is widely used as medicine and, when ingested, some ochres have an antacid effect on the digestive system while others, which are rich in iron, can assist with lethargy and fatigue. Ochre is also often mixed with plant oils and animal fats to create other medicines.

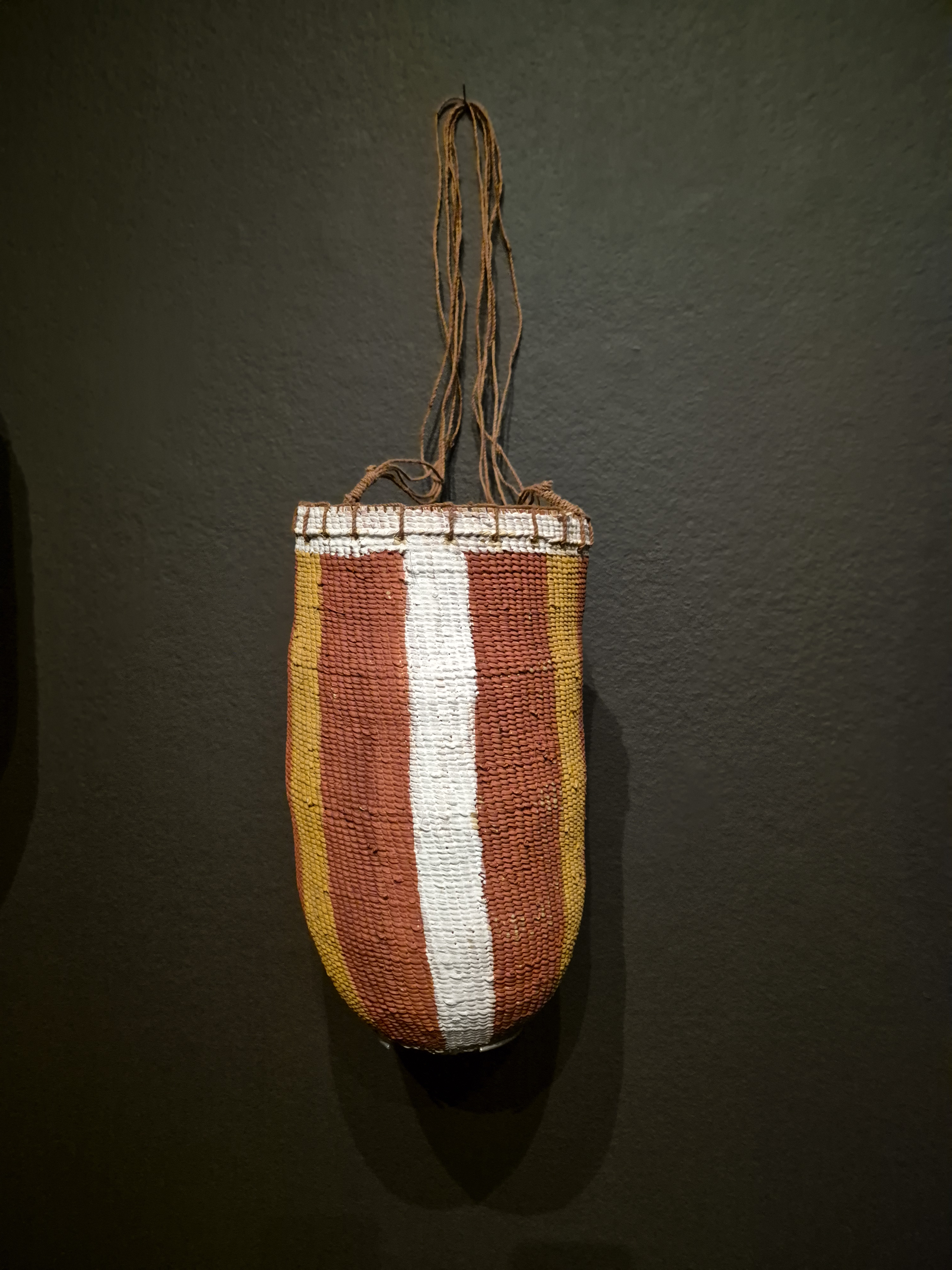
Painted mindirr (2020) by Helen Ganalmirriwuy Garrawurra, using ochres

There are many words for ochre in Australian Aboriginal languages throughout Australia, including:

- Yolŋu languages (Arnhem Land); which refers to white ochre as gapan
- Noongar language (South-Western Western Australia); which calls red and yellow ochre wilgee
- Wiradjuri language (New South Wales); which calls red ochre gubarr or gidyi
- Yawuru language (Kimberley region, WA); which refers to white/yellow ochre as gumbarri white as larli and red duguldugul (when used in ritual)
- Gija language (WA); which refers to white ochre as mawurntu and red ochre as badal

In 2019, a new source of white ochre (gapan) was found when refurbishing the Buku-Larrnngay Mulka Art Centre at Yirrkala.

== Modern history ==
The industrial process for making ochre pigment was developed by the French scientist Jean-Étienne Astier in the 1780s. He was from Roussillon and was fascinated by the cliffs of red and yellow clay in the region. He invented a process to make the pigment on a large scale, using the ochre mines and quarries in Roussillon, Rustrel, and Gargas in the Vaucluse.

After extracting clay of 10-20% ochre from open pits or mines, he washed it to separate ochre from sand, then decanted the mixture into large basins. The water was then drained, and the ochre was dried, cut into bricks, crushed, sifted, and classified by colour and quality. The best quality was reserved for artists' pigments.

Thanks to the process invented by Astier and refined by his successors, ochre pigments from Vaucluse were exported across Europe and around the world. It was not only used for artists paints and house paints; it also became an important ingredient for the early rubber industry.

Ochre from Vaucluse was an important French export until the mid-20th century, when major markets were lost due to the Russian Revolution and the Spanish Civil War. Ochre also began to face growing competition from synthetic pigments. The quarries in Roussillon, Rustrel, and Bruoux closed one by one. The last active quarry is in Gargas and belongs to the Société des Ocres de France.

In Great Britain, ochre was mined at Brixham, England. It became an important product for the British fishing industry, where it was combined with oil and used to coat sails to protect them from seawater, giving them a reddish colour. The ochre was boiled in great caldrons, together with tar, tallow, and oak bark, the last ingredient giving the name of barking yards to the places where the hot mixture was painted on to the sails, which were then hung up to dry. In 1894, a theft case provided insights into the use of the pigment as a food adulterant in sausage roll production whereby the accused apprentice was taught to soak brown bread in red ochre, salt, and pepper to give the appearance of beef sausage for the filling.

== Modern uses ==
=== Paint pigment ===
Ochres are non-toxic and can be used to make an oil paint that dries quickly and covers surfaces thoroughly. Owing to dwindling supplies of the natural product, modern ochre pigments are made using synthetic iron oxide. Pigments which use natural ochre pigments indicate it with the name PY-43 (Pigment yellow 43) or PBr7 on the label, following the Colour Index International system. However, by 2002 there were no longer any suppliers of natural iron oxide pigments registered with the Society of Dyers and Colourists' (UK) Colour Index. Deletion of the two codes was considered, but manufacturers fought to retain the designations for the synthetic versions of the colours.

=== In heraldry and vexillology ===
Ochre, both red and yellow, appear as tinctures in South African heraldry; the national coat of arms, adopted in 2000, includes red ochre, while (yellow) ochre appears in the arms of the University of Transkei.

Ochre is also used as a symbol of Aboriginal Australians, and appears on the Flag of the Northern Territory and on the flags of the Taungurung and Aṉangu people.

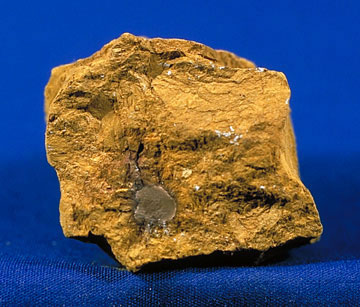
Limonite, a mineraloid containing iron hydroxide, is the main ingredient of all the ochre pigments.

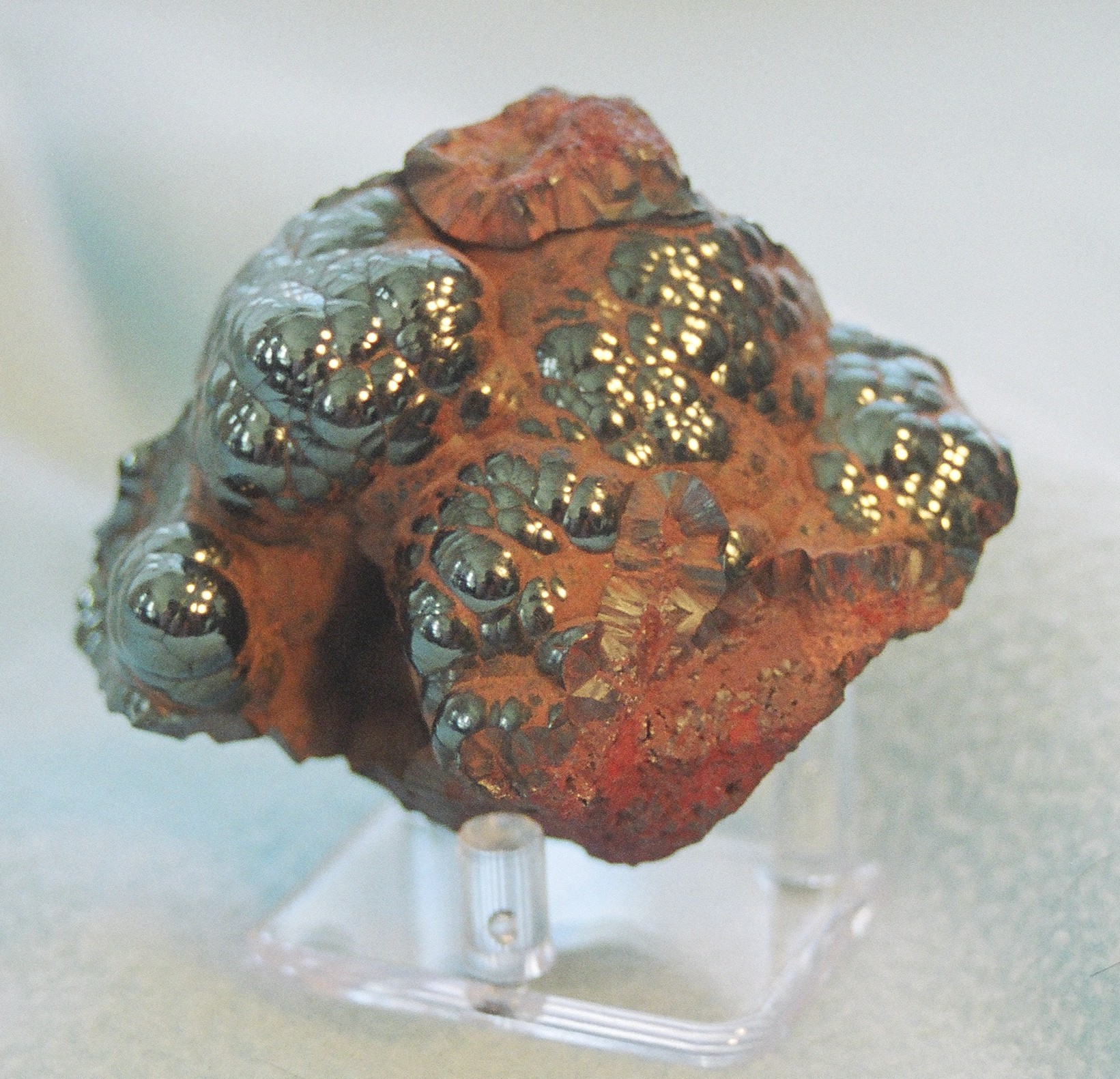
Hematite is a more reddish variety of iron oxide, and is the main ingredient of red ochre.

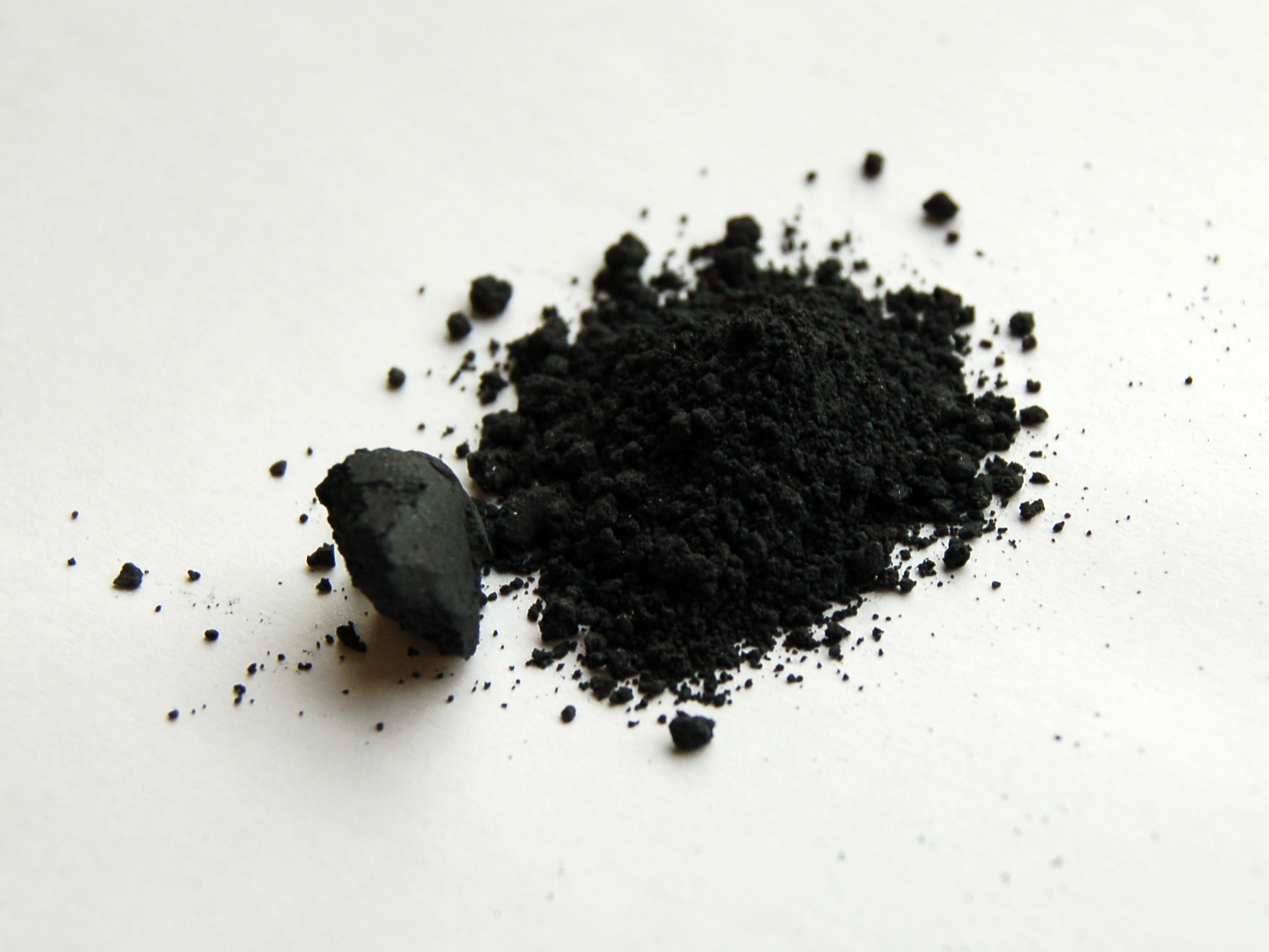
Pure manganese dioxide

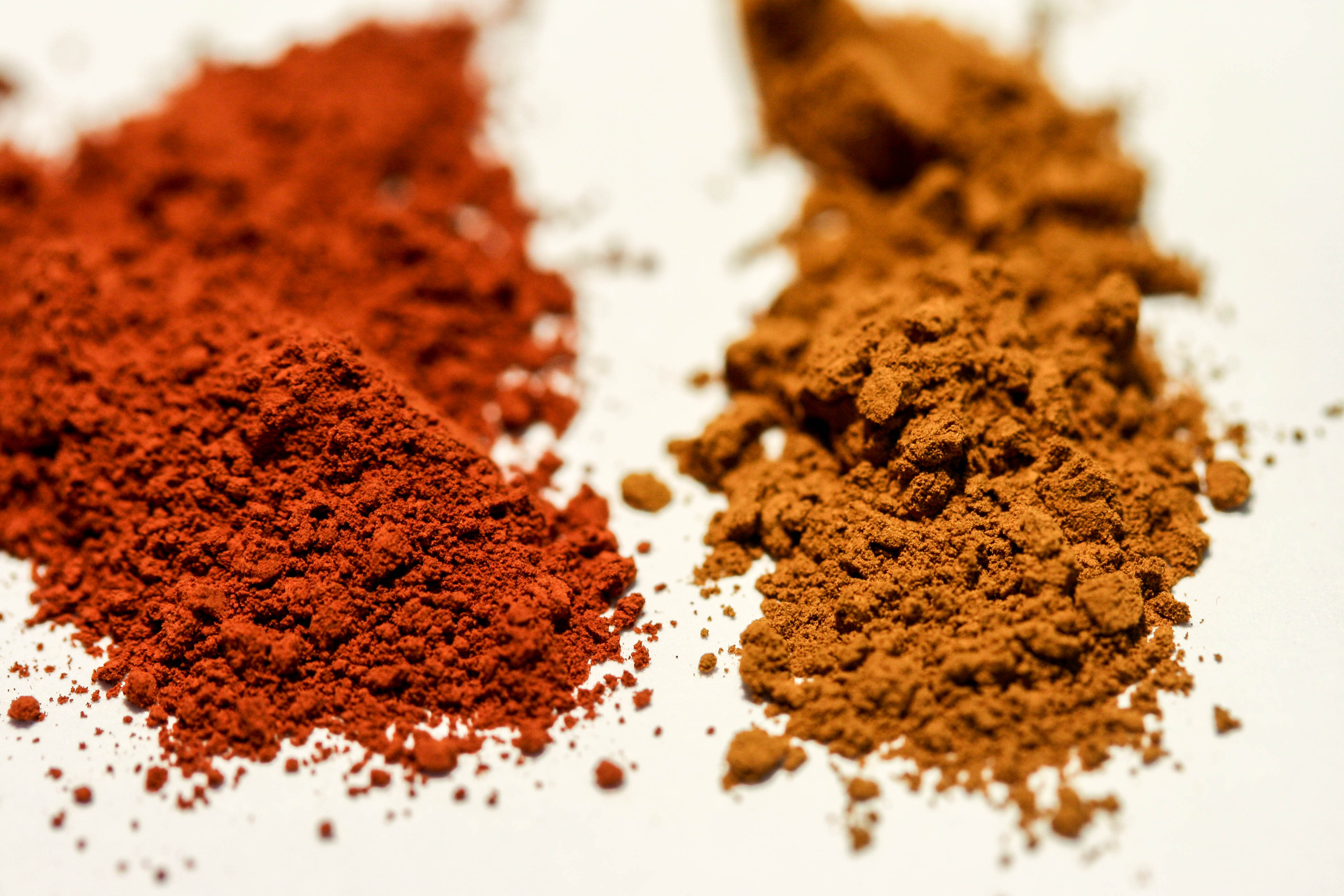
Burnt and raw sienna

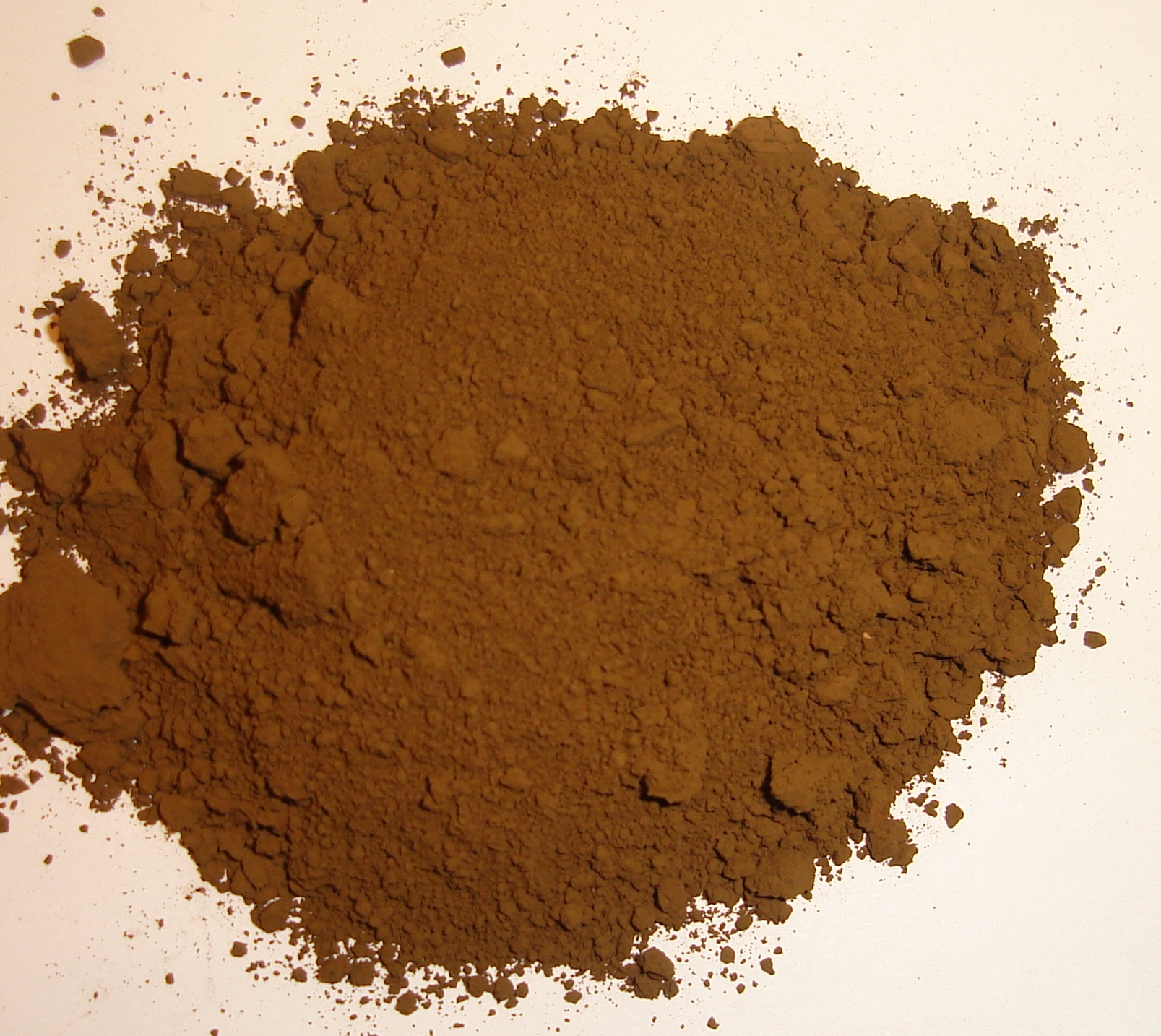
Raw umber; the higher manganese oxide content makes it darker

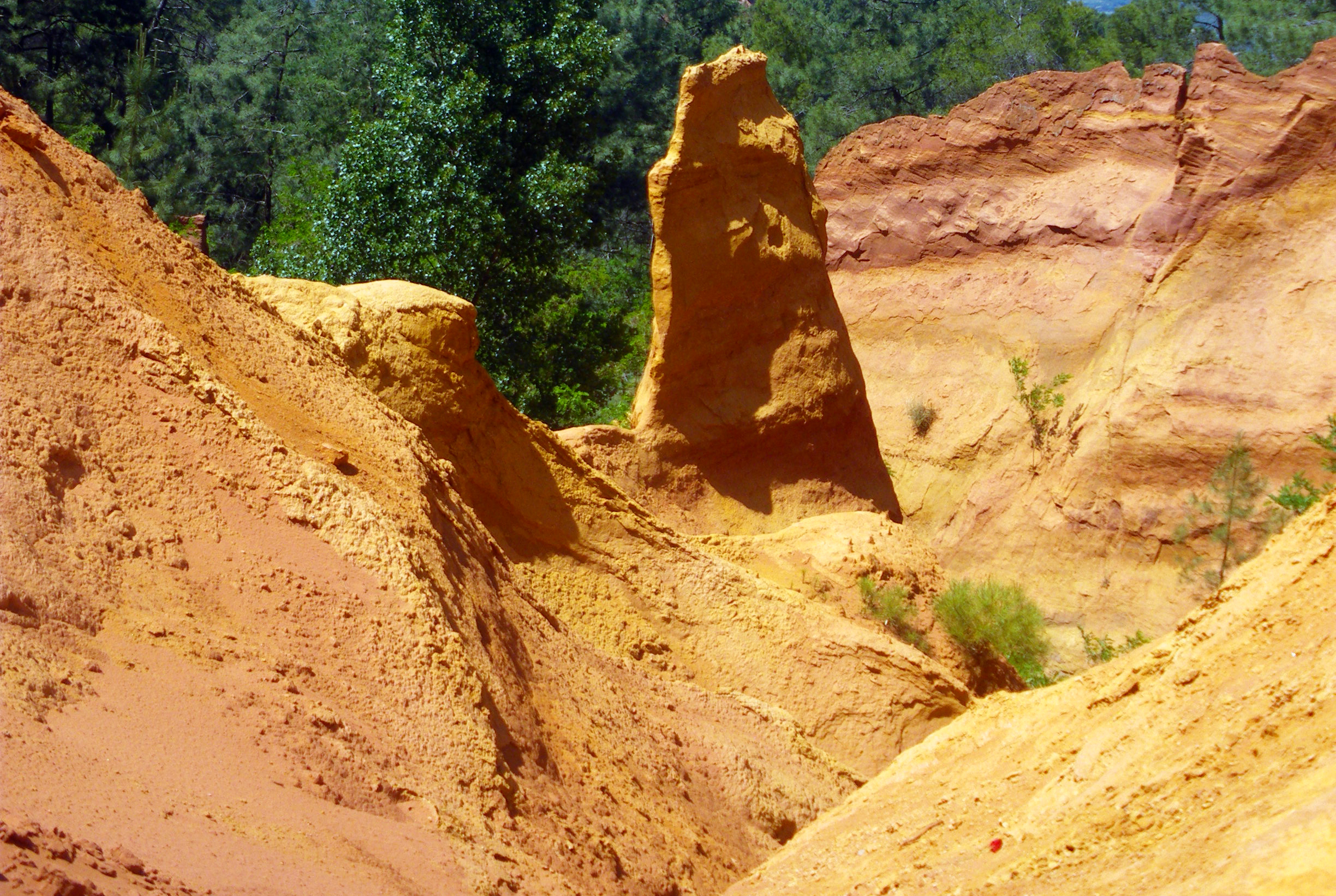
The clay hills of Roussillon, Vaucluse, in Provence have been an important source of ochre pigment since the 18th century.

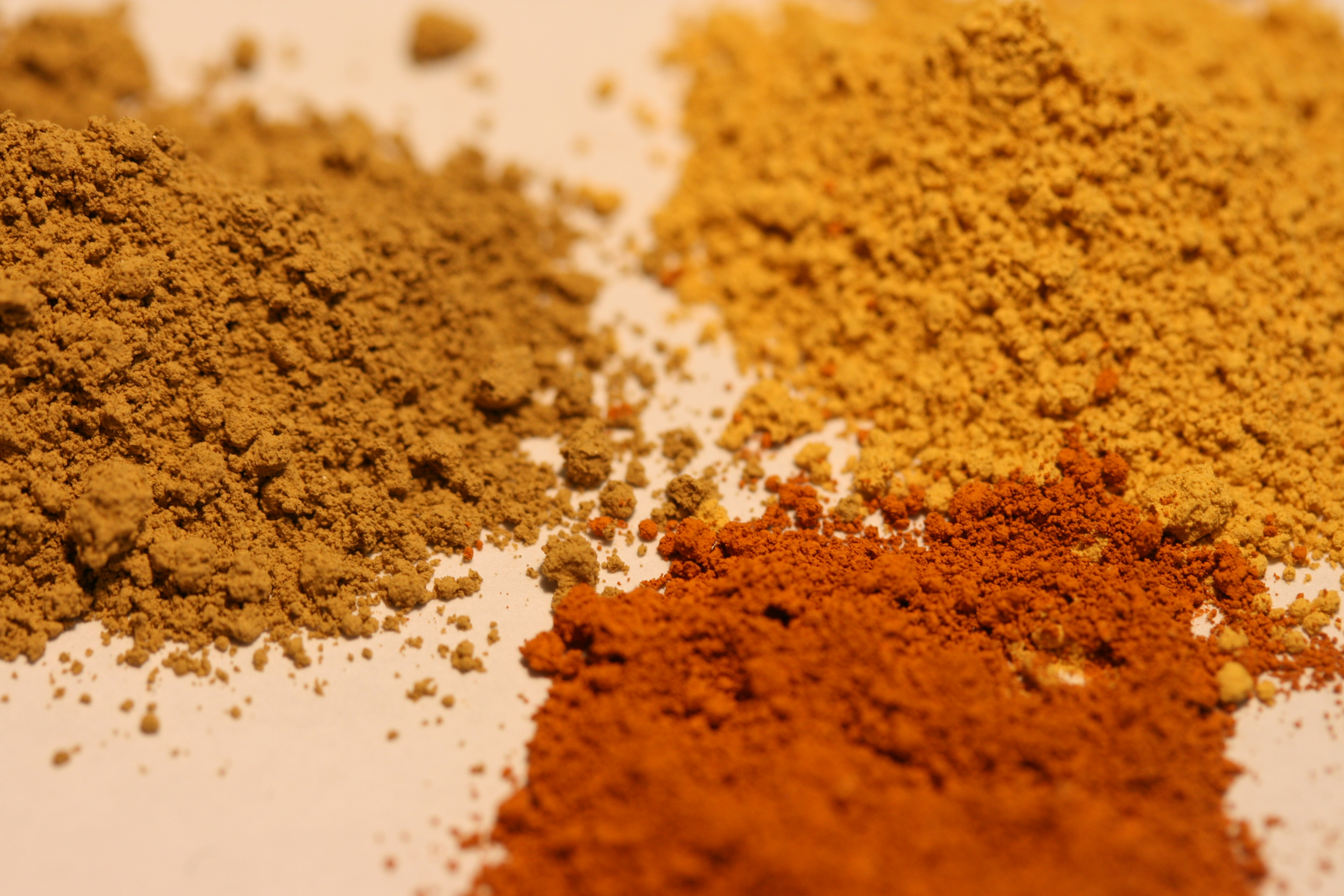
Three shades of ochre; naturally occurring ochre is often a mix of minerals

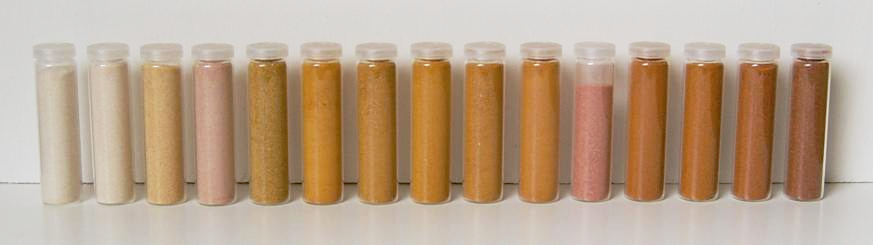
A broad range of colours can be created with naturally occurring or human-blended mixtures of these minerals.

== See also ==
- Banded Iron Formation
- Falu red
- Female cosmetic coalitions
- Attic ochre
- Iron ochre
- Lead ochre
- Iron(III) oxide
- List of colors
- List of inorganic pigments
- Red Lady of Paviland
- Red pigments
