= Iron ochre =

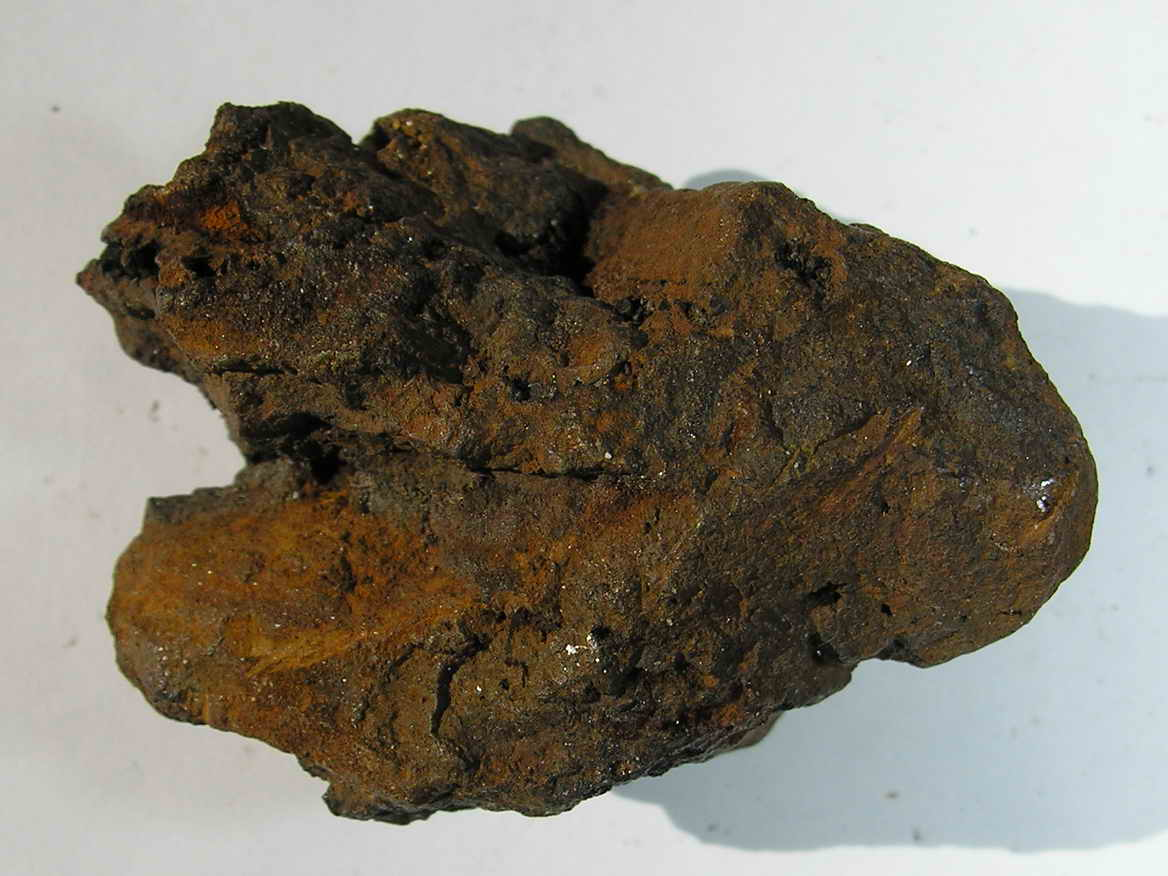

General
- Category: Minerals

Iron ochre or iron ocher (Ancient Greek: ὠχρός, pale yellow, orange) is one of several minerals found in iron ore.

== Description ==
The term iron ochre, primarily used among mineral collectors, geologists, miners, and various other related professions, one of several iron ore minerals, Common abrasives and pigments with a red-brown or brown-orange hue and the powdery consistency of ochre, were known under this name. The minerals include:

- hematite — Fe_{2}O_{3}, a widespread iron mineral, one of the most important iron ores
- limonite — Fe_{2}O_{3}·Н_{2}О, a mixture of secondary natural minerals, iron oxide hydrates
- goethite — α-FeO(OH), a product of weathering of ores, a secondary iron mineral, the main component of limonite, part of brown iron ores
- lepidocrocite (also known as "brown iron ochre") — γ-FeO(OH), a secondary mineral, a product of the oxidation of iron ore minerals, found in brown iron ores
- ferric oxide — Fe_{2}O_{3} (oxides of iron), which also occurs naturally as the mineral magnetite
- ferrihydrite — Fe_{2}O_{3}·0.5H_{2}O, is a widespread hydrous ferric oxyhydroxide mineral at the Earth's surface

== Gallery ==
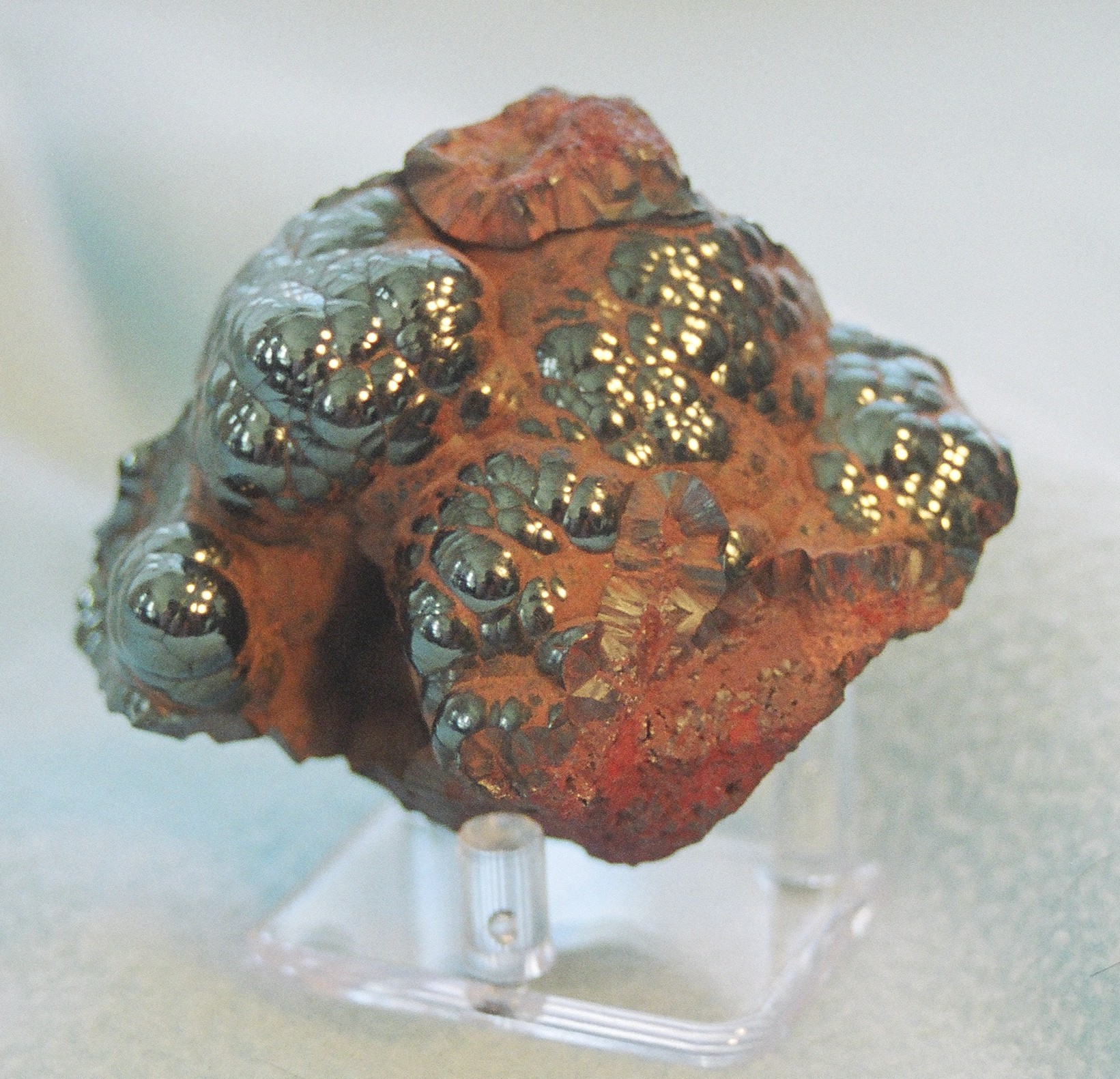
Hematite

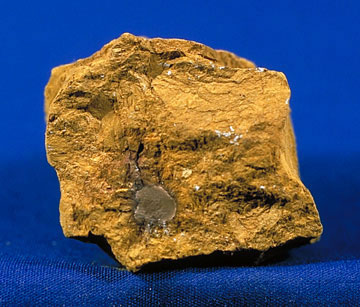
Limonite

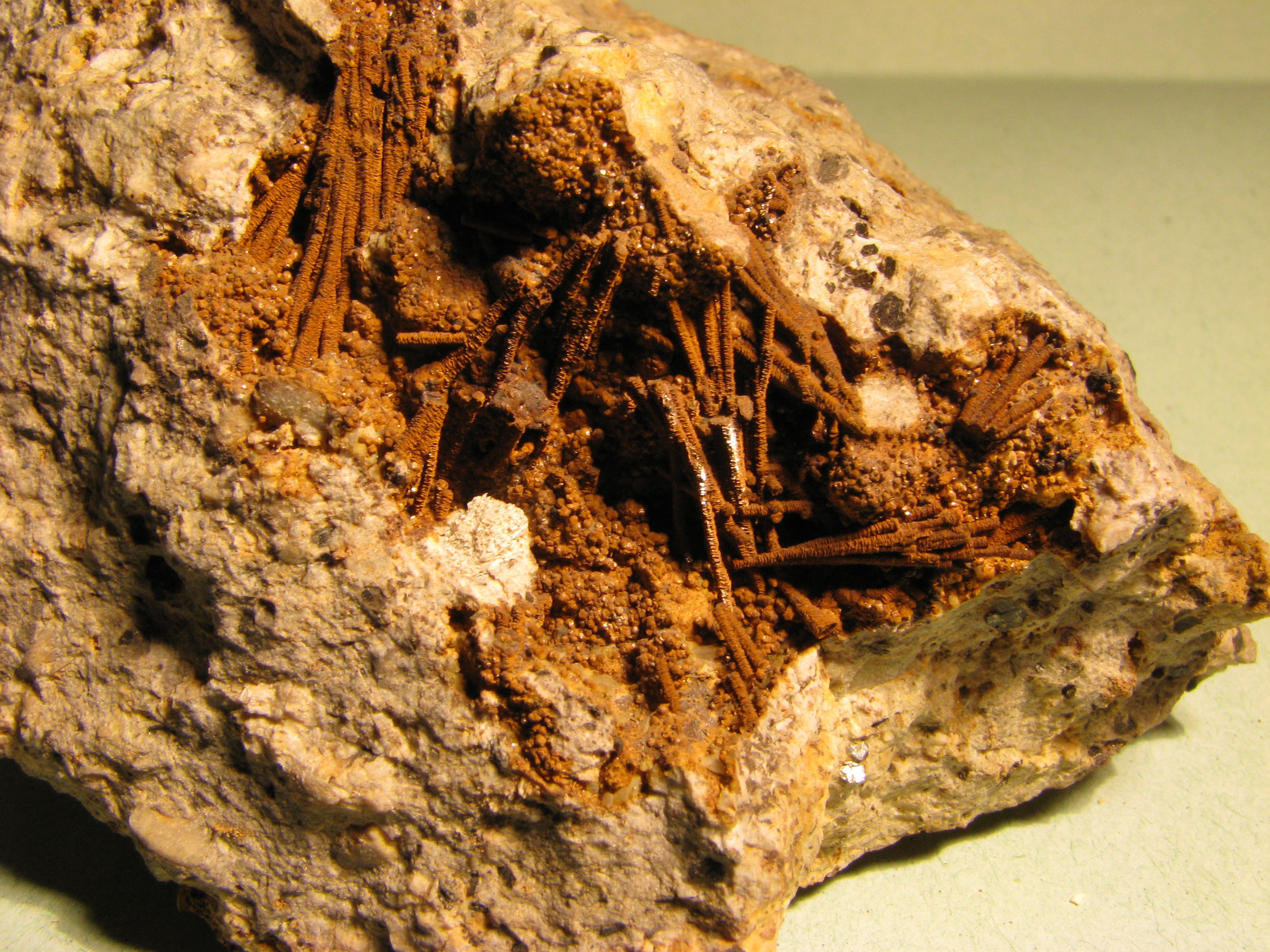
Goethite

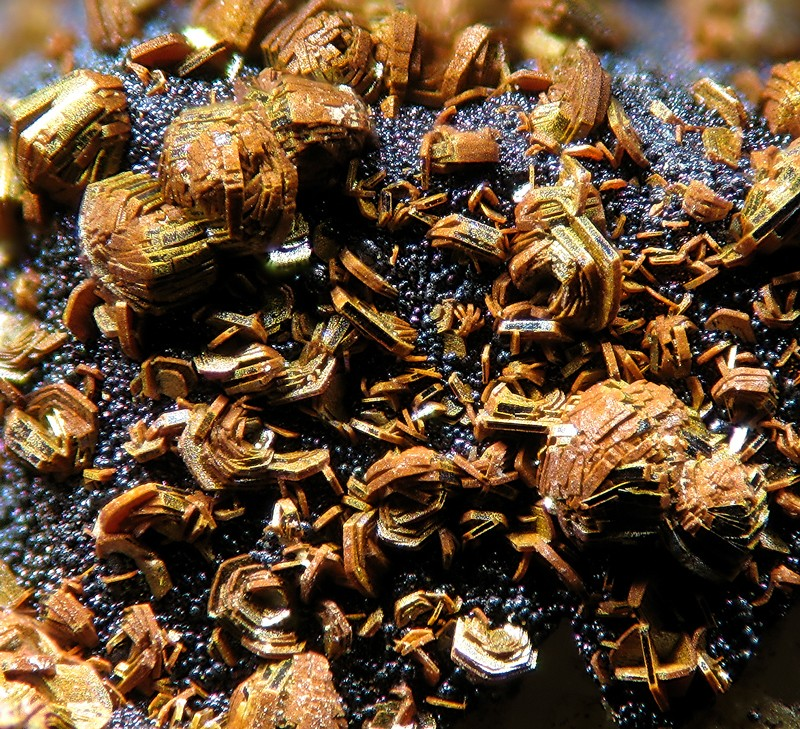
Lepidocrocite

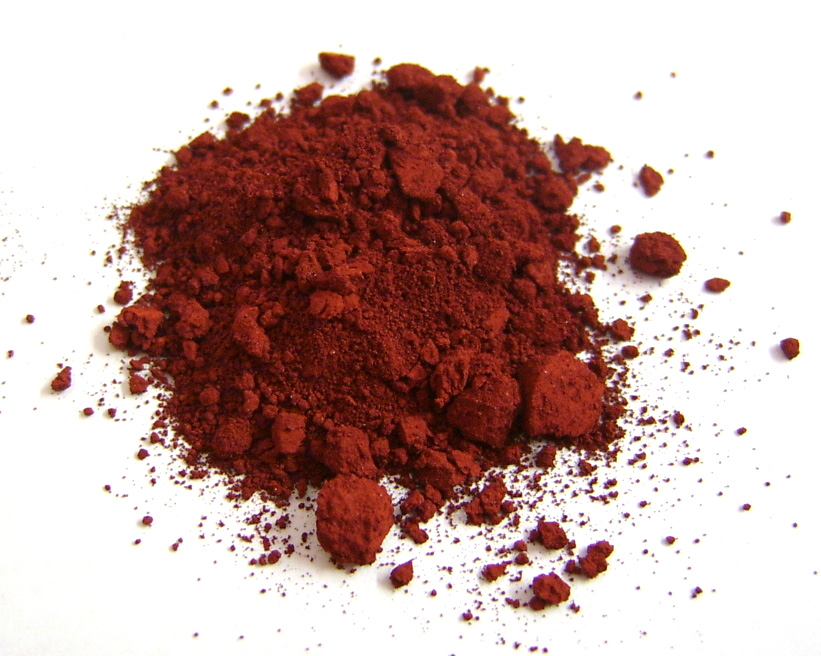
Ferric oxide

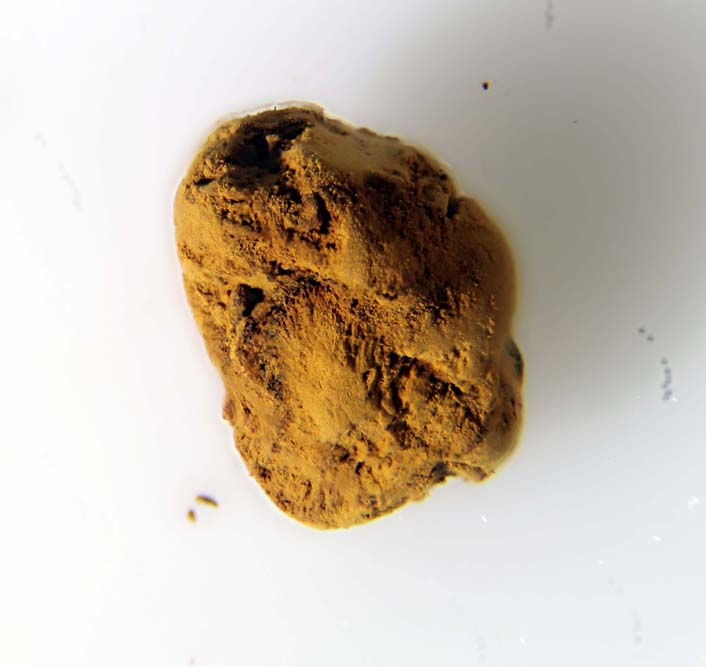
Ferrihydrite

== See also ==
- Ochre
- Ochre (disambiguation)
- Iron (disambiguation)
- Iron(III) oxide
- List of inorganic pigments
- Red pigments
- List of colors
- Lead ochres
- Antimony ochres
- Cobalt ochres
- Yellow
