= Lead =

Lead, _{82}Pb
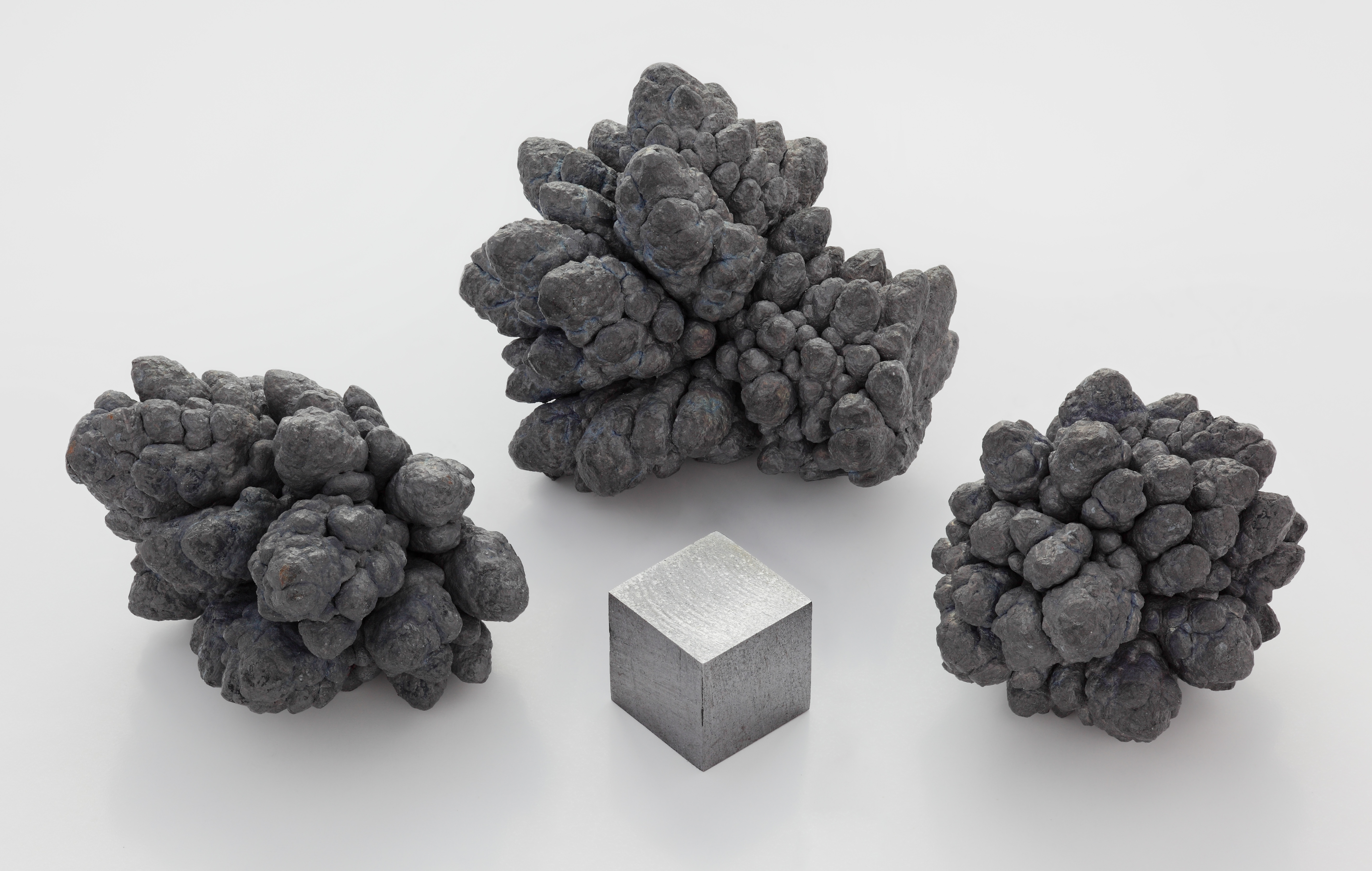

Lead
- Pronunciation: /lɛd/ (led)
- Alternative name: Plumbum, pronounced: /ˈplʌm.bəm/ (PLUM-bəhm)
- Appearance: metallic gray

Standard atomic weight A_{r}°(Pb)
- [206.14, 207.94]; 207.2±1.1 (abridged)

Lead in the periodic table
| Hydrogen | | | | | | | | | | | | | | | | | | | | | | | | | | | | | | | Helium |
| Lithium | Beryllium | | | | | | | | | | | | | | | | | | | | | | | | | Boron | Carbon | Nitrogen | Oxygen | Fluorine | Neon |
| Sodium | Magnesium | | | | | | | | | | | | | | | | | | | | | | | | | Aluminium | Silicon | Phosphorus | Sulfur | Chlorine | Argon |
| Potassium | Calcium | | | | | | | | | | | | | | | Scandium | Titanium | Vanadium | Chromium | Manganese | Iron | Cobalt | Nickel | Copper | Zinc | Gallium | Germanium | Arsenic | Selenium | Bromine | Krypton |
| Rubidium | Strontium | | | | | | | | | | | | | | | Yttrium | Zirconium | Niobium | Molybdenum | Technetium | Ruthenium | Rhodium | Palladium | Silver | Cadmium | Indium | Tin | Antimony | Tellurium | Iodine | Xenon |
| Caesium | Barium | Lanthanum | Cerium | Praseodymium | Neodymium | Promethium | Samarium | Europium | Gadolinium | Terbium | Dysprosium | Holmium | Erbium | Thulium | Ytterbium | Lutetium | Hafnium | Tantalum | Tungsten | Rhenium | Osmium | Iridium | Platinum | Gold | Mercury (element) | Thallium | Lead | Bismuth | Polonium | Astatine | Radon |
| Francium | Radium | Actinium | Thorium | Protactinium | Uranium | Neptunium | Plutonium | Americium | Curium | Berkelium | Californium | Einsteinium | Fermium | Mendelevium | Nobelium | Lawrencium | Rutherfordium | Dubnium | Seaborgium | Bohrium | Hassium | Meitnerium | Darmstadtium | Roentgenium | Copernicium | Nihonium | Flerovium | Moscovium | Livermorium | Tennessine | Oganesson |
Sn
↑
Pb
↓
Fl
thallium ← lead → bismuth
- Atomic number (Z): 82
- Group: group 14 (carbon group)
- Period: period 6
- Block: p-block
- Electron configuration: [Xe] 4f^{14} 5d^{10} 6s^{2} 6p^{2}
- Electrons per shell: 2, 8, 18, 32, 18, 4

Physical properties
- Phase at STP: solid
- Melting point: 600.61 K (327.46 °C, 621.43 °F)
- Boiling point: 2022 K (1749 °C, 3180 °F)
- Density (at 20 °C): 11.348 g/cm^{3}
- when liquid (at m.p.): 10.66 g/cm^{3}
- Heat of fusion: 4.77 kJ/mol
- Heat of vaporization: 179.5 kJ/mol
- Molar heat capacity: 26.650 J/(mol·K)
- Specific heat capacity: 128.62 J/(kg·K)
Vapor pressure
| P (Pa) | 1 | 10 | 100 | 1 k | 10 k | 100 k |
|---|---|---|---|---|---|---|
| at T (K) | 978 | 1088 | 1229 | 1412 | 1660 | 2027 |

Atomic properties
- Oxidation states: common: +2, +4 −4, −2, −1, 0, +1, +3
- Electronegativity: Pauling scale: 2.33 (in +4), 1.87 (in +2)
- Ionization energies: 1st: 715.6 kJ/mol; 2nd: 1450.5 kJ/mol; 3rd: 3081.5 kJ/mol
- Atomic radius: empirical: 175 pm
- Covalent radius: 146±5 pm
- Van der Waals radius: 202 pm
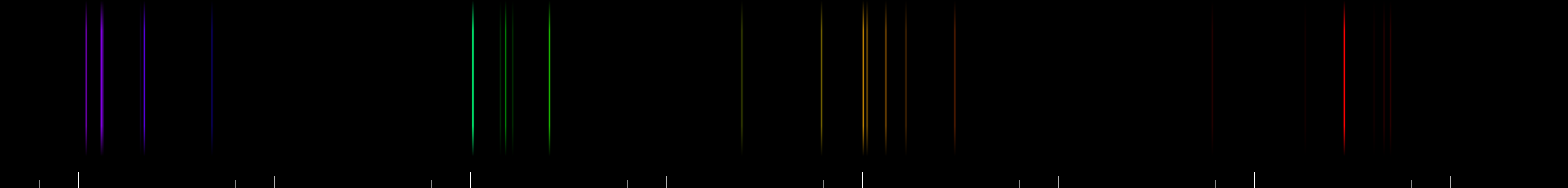
- Spectral lines of lead

Other properties
- Natural occurrence: primordial
- Crystal structure: face-centered cubic (fcc) (cF4)
- Lattice constant: a = 494.99 pm (at 20 °C)
- Thermal expansion: 28.73×10^{−6}/K (at 20 °C)
- Thermal conductivity: 35.3 W/(m⋅K)
- Electrical resistivity: 208 nΩ⋅m (at 20 °C)
- Magnetic ordering: diamagnetic
- Molar magnetic susceptibility: −23.0×10^{−6} cm^{3}/mol (at 298 K)
- Young's modulus: 16 GPa
- Shear modulus: 5.6 GPa
- Bulk modulus: 46 GPa
- Speed of sound thin rod: 1190 m/s (at r.t.) (annealed)
- Poisson ratio: 0.44
- Mohs hardness: 1.5
- Brinell hardness: 38–50 MPa
- CAS Number: 7439-92-1

History
- Naming: possibly from a PIE root meaning “to flow”, for its low melting point
- Discovery: Middle East (7000 BCE)
- Symbol: "Pb": from Latin plumbum

Isotopes of lead
| Main isotopes | | | Decay | |
| Isotope | abundance | half-life (t_{1/2}) | mode | product |
|---|---|---|---|---|
| ^{202}Pb | synth | 5.25×10^{4} y | ε | ^{202}Tl |
| ^{204}Pb | 1.4% | stable | | |
| ^{205}Pb | synth | 1.70×10^{7} y | ε | ^{205}Tl |
| ^{206}Pb | 24.1% | stable | | |
| ^{207}Pb | 22.1% | stable | | |
| ^{208}Pb | 52.4% | stable | | |
| ^{209}Pb | (unstable) | 3.235 h | β^{−} | ^{209}Bi |
| ^{210}Pb | (unstable) | 22.2 y | β^{−} | ^{210}Bi |
| ^{210}Pb | (unstable) | 22.2 y | α | ^{206}Hg |
| ^{211}Pb | (unstable) | 36.16 min | β^{−} | ^{211}Bi |
| ^{212}Pb | (unstable) | 10.627 h | β^{−} | ^{212}Bi |
| ^{214}Pb | (unstable) | 27.06 min | β^{−} | ^{214}Bi |
Isotopic abundances vary greatly by sample

Lead (/lɛd/) is a chemical element with the symbol Pb (from Latin plumbum) and has the atomic number 82. It is a heavy metal, meaning it is denser than most common materials. Lead is malleable and soft, meaning it can be shaped into different shapes and has a relatively low melting point. When freshly cut or melted, it appears shiny silvery with a bluish tint, but tarnishes to dull gray on exposure to air. Lead has the highest atomic number of any stable element, and three of its isotopes are endpoints of major nuclear decay chains of heavier elements.

Lead is a relatively un-reactive post-transition metal. Its weak metallic character is shown by its amphoteric behavior: lead and lead oxides react with both acids and bases, and it tends to form covalent bonds. Lead compounds usually occur in the +2 oxidation state rather than the +4 state common in lighter members of the carbon group, with exceptions mostly limited to organolead compounds. Like the lighter members of the group, lead can bond with itself, forming chains and polyhedral structures.

Since lead is easily extracted from its ores, prehistoric people in the Near East were aware of it. Galena is a principal ore of lead which often bears silver. Interest in silver helped initiate widespread extraction and use of lead in ancient Rome. Lead production declined after the fall of Rome and did not reach comparable levels until the Industrial Revolution. Lead played a crucial role in the development of the printing press, as movable type could be relatively easily cast from lead alloys. In 2022, the annual global production of lead was about twelve million tonnes, about two thirds of which was from recycling. Lead's high density, low melting point, ductility and relative inertness to oxidation make it useful. These properties, combined with its relative abundance and low cost, resulted in its extensive use in construction, plumbing, batteries, bullets, shots (pellets), weights, solders, pewter, fusible alloys, lead paints, leaded gasoline, and radiation shielding.

Lead is a neurotoxin that accumulates in soft tissues and bones. It damages the nervous system, interferes with biological enzymes, and can cause neurological disorders ranging from behavioral problems to brain damage. It also affects cardiovascular and renal systems. Lead's toxicity was noted by Ancient Greek and Roman writers, but became widely recognized in Europe in the late 19th century.

== Physical properties ==
=== Atomic ===
A lead atom has 82 electrons, with the electron configuration [Xe]4f^{14}5d^{10}6s^{2}6p^{2}. The combined first and second ionization energies—the total energy required to remove the two 6p electrons—are similar to those of tin, lead's immediate neighbor above in the carbon group. This is unusual, as ionization energies typically decrease down a group due to the outer electrons being farther from the nucleus and more shielded by inner orbitals. However, the sum of the first four ionization energies of lead is higher than that of tin, contrary to periodic trends. This anomaly is explained by relativistic effects, which become significant in heavier atoms. These effects contract the s and p orbitals, giving lead's 6s electrons greater binding energies than its 5s electrons. This leads to the inert-pair effect, where the 6s electrons are less likely to participate in bonding. The result is stabilization of the +2 oxidation state and unusually long distances between nearest atoms in crystalline lead.

Lighter carbon-group congeners of lead form stable or metastable allotropes with the tetrahedrally coordinated, covalently bonded diamond cubic structure. In these elements, the s- and p-orbital energy levels are close enough to allow mixing into four hybrid sp^{3} orbitals. In lead, however, the inert pair effect increases the separation between s- and p-orbitals so much that the energy gain from hybridization is insufficient to overcome this gap. Instead of a diamond cubic arrangement, lead forms metallic bonds in which only the p-electrons are delocalized and shared among Pb^{2+} ions. Consequently, lead adopts a face-centered cubic structure, similar to the divalent metals calcium and strontium. (Note: The tetrahedral allotrope of tin is called α- or gray tin and is stable only at or below 13.2 °C (55.8 °F). The stable form of tin above this temperature is called β- or white tin and has a distorted face centered cubic (tetragonal) structure which can be derived by compressing the tetrahedra of gray tin along their cubic axes. White tin effectively has a structure intermediate between the regular tetrahedral structure of gray tin, and the regular face centered cubic structure of lead, consistent with the general trend of increasing metallic character going down any representative group.) (Note: A quasicrystalline thin-film allotrope of lead, with pentagonal symmetry, was reported in 2013. The allotrope was obtained by depositing lead atoms on the surface of an icosahedral silver-indium-ytterbium quasicrystal. Its conductivity was not recorded.) (Note: Diamond cubic structures with lattice parameters around the lattice parameter of silicon exists both in thin lead and tin films, and in massive lead and tin, freshly solidified in vacuum of ~5 × 10^{−6} Torr. Experimental evidence for almost identical structures of at least three oxide types is presented, demonstrating that lead and tin behave like silicon not only in the initial stages of crystallization, but also in the initial stages of oxidation.)

=== Bulk ===
Pure lead has a bright, shiny gray appearance with a faint blue tint. It tarnishes when exposed to moist air, developing a dull surface whose color depends on environmental conditions. Lead is characterized by high density, malleability, ductility, and resistance to corrosion due to passivation.

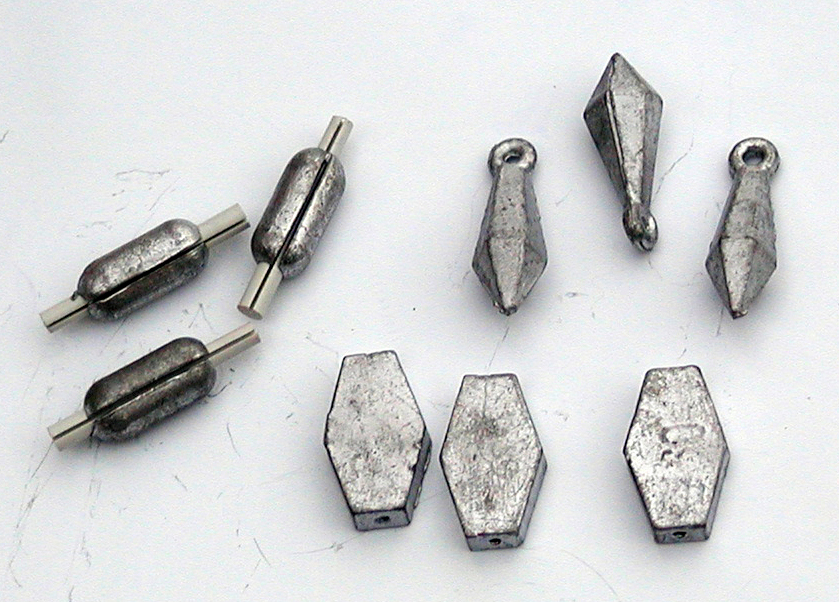
Lead fishing weights

Its close-packed face-centered cubic structure and high atomic mass give lead a density of 11.34 g/cm^{3}, greater than that of common metals such as iron (7.87 g/cm^{3}), copper (8.93 g/cm^{3}), and zinc (7.14 g/cm^{3}). This high density is the origin of the idiom to go over like a lead balloon. (Note: British English: to go down like a lead balloon.) Some rarer metals are denser: tungsten and gold are both 19.3 g/cm^{3}, while osmium—the densest known metal—has a density of 22.59 g/cm^{3}, nearly twice that of lead.

Lead is soft, with a Mohs hardness of 1.5, and can be scratched with a fingernail. It is very malleable and moderately ductile. (Note: Malleability describes how easily it deforms under compression, whereas ductility means its ability to stretch.) Its bulk modulus—a measure of resistance to compression—is 45.8 GPa, compared with 75.2 GPa for aluminium, 137.8 GPa for copper, and 160–169 GPa for mild steel. Lead's tensile strength is low, at 12–17 MPa (around six times lower than aluminium, ten times lower than copper, and fifteen times lower than mild steel). Its strength can be increased by alloying with small amounts of copper or antimony.

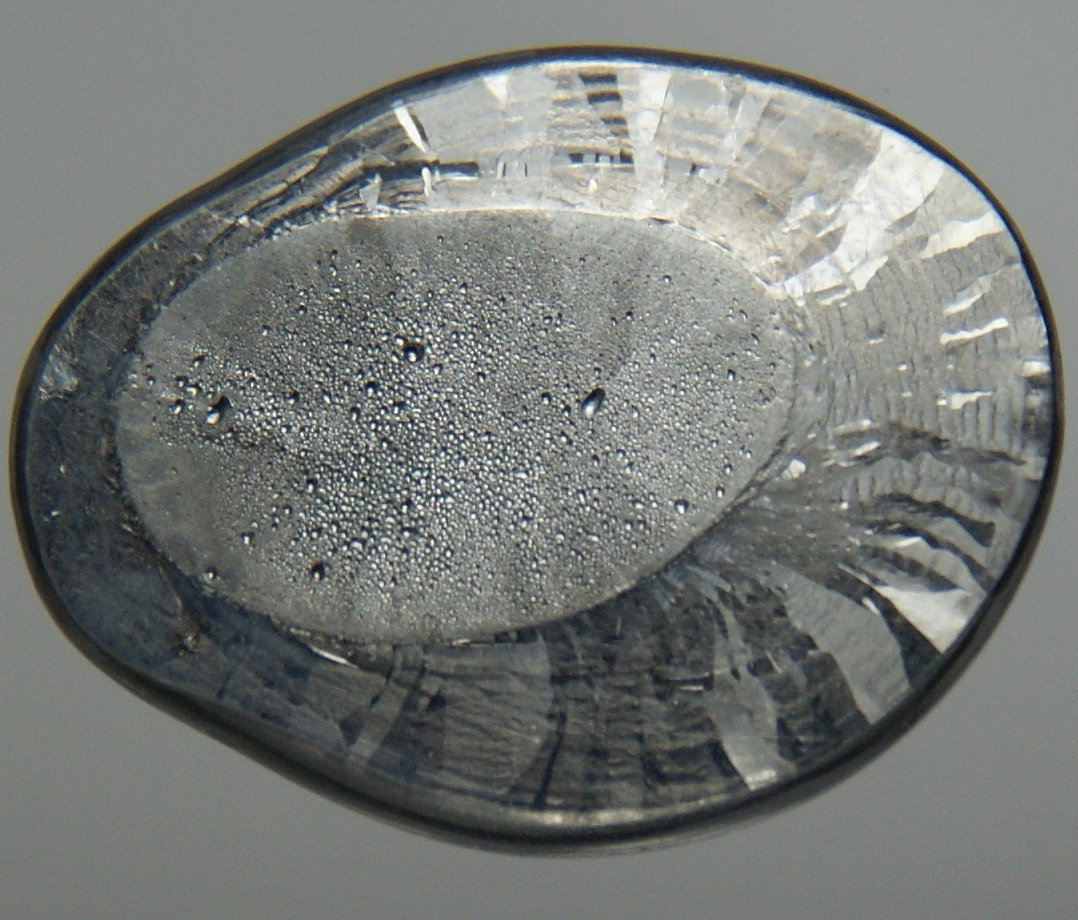
A sample of lead solidified from the molten state

Lead melts at 327.5 °C (621.5 °F), a relatively low melting point compared to most metals, (Note: A (wet) finger can be dipped into molten lead without risk of a burning injury.) and has a boiling point of 1749 °C (3180 °F), the lowest among the carbon-group elements. Its electrical resistivity at 20 °C is 192 nanoohm-meters, almost an order of magnitude higher than that of good conductors (copper: 15.43 nΩ·m; gold: 20.51 nΩ·m; aluminium: 24.15 nΩ·m). Lead becomes a superconductor below 7.19 K, which is the highest critical temperature among type-I superconductors and the third highest among the elemental superconductors.

=== Isotopes ===
Natural lead consists of four stable isotopes with mass numbers 204, 206, 207, and 208, along with traces of six short-lived radioisotopes with mass numbers 209–214. The relatively high number of isotopes is consistent with lead's even atomic number. (Note: An even number of either protons or neutrons generally increases the nuclear stability of isotopes, compared to isotopes with odd numbers. No elements with odd atomic numbers have more than two stable isotopes; even-numbered elements have multiple stable isotopes, with tin (element 50) having the highest number of isotopes of all elements, ten. See Even and odd atomic nuclei for more details.) Lead has a magic number of protons (82), making its nucleus especially stable according to the nuclear shell model. Lead-208 also has 126 neutrons, another magic number, which may account for its exceptional stability.

With its high atomic number, lead is the heaviest element whose natural isotopes are considered stable; lead-208 is the heaviest stable nucleus known. This distinction previously belonged to bismuth (atomic number 83) until its sole primordial isotope, bismuth-209, was found in 2003 to decay extremely slowly. (Note: The half-life found in the experiment was 1.9×10^{19} years. A kilogram of natural bismuth would have an activity value of approximately 0.003 becquerels (decays per second). For comparison, the activity value of natural radiation in the human body is around 65 becquerels per kilogram of body weight (4500 becquerels on average).) Although the four stable isotopes of lead could theoretically undergo alpha decay to mercury isotopes with an energy release, no such decay has been observed; their predicted half-lives range from 10^{35} to 10^{189} years, at least 10^{25} times the current age of the universe.

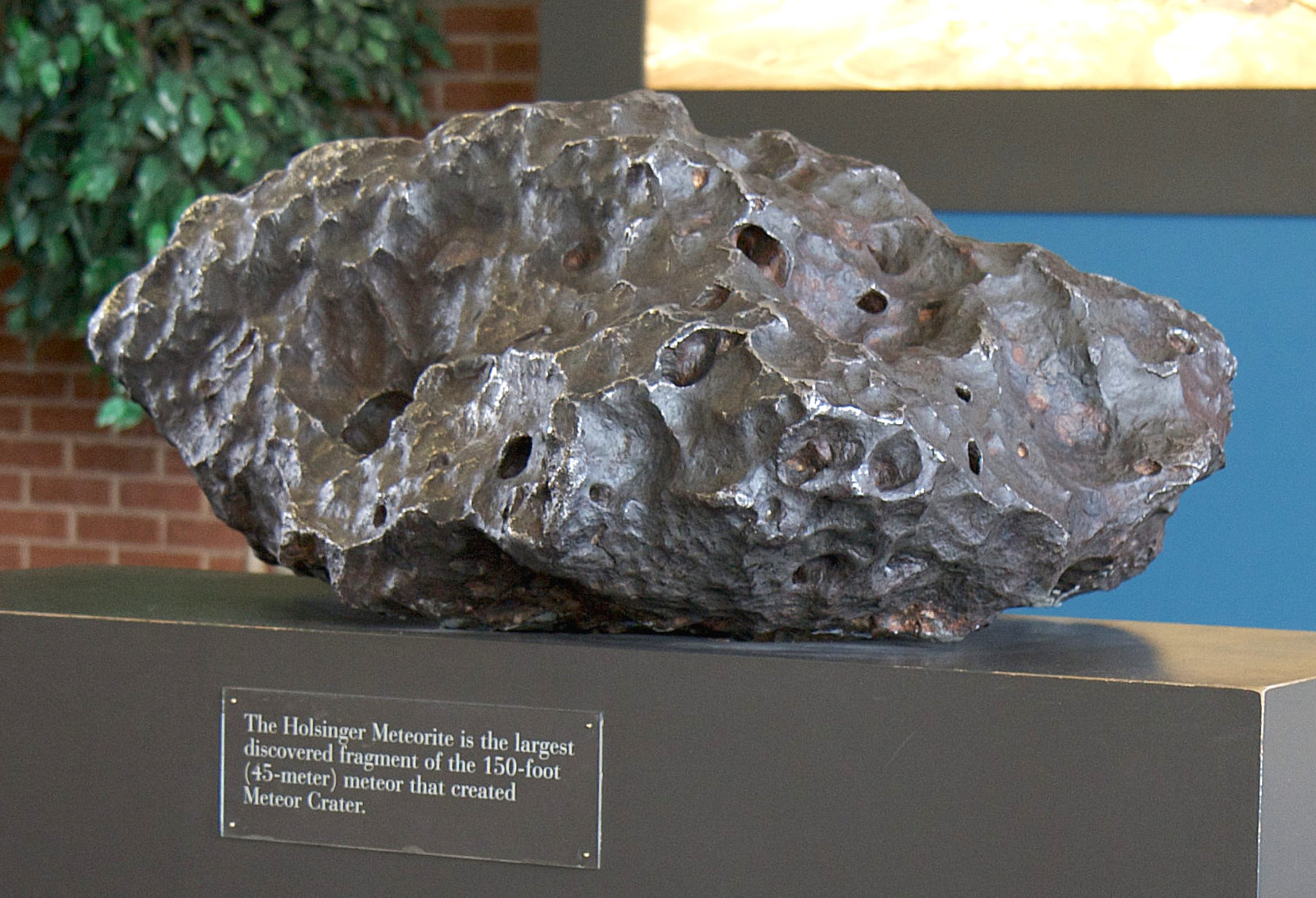
The Holsinger meteorite, the largest piece of the Canyon Diablo meteorite. Uranium–lead dating and lead–lead dating on this meteorite allowed refinement of the age of the Earth to 4.55 billion ± 70 million years.

Three of lead's stable isotopes—lead-206, lead-207, and lead-208—are the end products of the three major natural decay chains: the uranium chain (from uranium-238), the actinium chain (from uranium-235), and the thorium chain (from thorium-232), respectively. The isotopic composition of a rock sample depends on the presence of these parent isotopes; for example, lead-208 abundance can vary from about 52% in ordinary samples to as much as 90% in thorium ores. For this reason, the standard atomic weight of lead is reported to only one decimal place. Over time, the ratios of these isotopes to lead-204 increase as they are produced by radioactive decay. These variations allow for lead–lead and uranium–lead dating. Lead-207 exhibits nuclear magnetic resonance, a property used to study its compounds in both solution and solid states, including in biological systems such as the human body.

== Chemistry ==
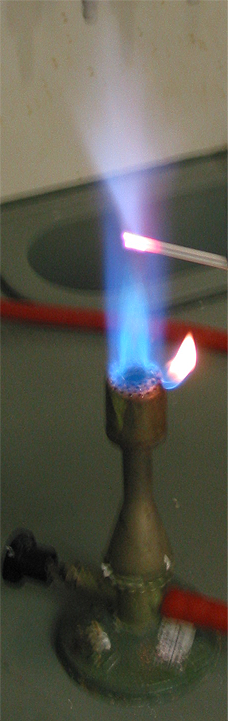
Flame test: lead colors flame pale blue

When exposed to moist air, bulk lead develops a protective surface layer of variable composition. Lead(II) carbonate is a common constituent, and in urban or maritime environments, lead(II) sulfate or lead(II) chloride may also be present. This layer renders bulk lead effectively inert under atmospheric conditions. In contrast, finely powdered lead, like many metals, is pyrophoric and burns with a bluish-white flame.

Lead reacts with fluorine at room temperature to form lead(II) fluoride. Its reaction with chlorine is similar but requires heating, as the resulting chloride layer reduces further reactivity. Molten lead combines with the chalcogens to produce lead(II) chalcogenides.

The metal resists attack by sulfuric and phosphoric acids but not by hydrochloric or nitric acids; the difference arises from the insolubility and subsequent passivation of certain lead salts. Organic acids, such as acetic acid, dissolve lead in the presence of oxygen. Concentrated alkalis can also dissolve lead, producing plumbites.

=== Inorganic compounds ===
Lead exhibits two principal oxidation states: +4 and +2. While the tetravalent state is characteristic of the carbon group, the divalent state is rare for carbon and silicon, less common for germanium, significant but not dominant for tin, and the most prevalent for lead. This predominance is linked to relativistic effects—specifically the inert pair effect—which occurs when there is a large electronegativity difference between lead and anions such as oxide, halide, or nitride. In such cases, lead develops a pronounced partial positive charge, causing a stronger contraction of the 6s orbital compared to the 6p orbital and rendering it relatively unreactive in ionic compounds. The inert pair effect is less pronounced in compounds where lead forms covalent bonds with elements of similar electronegativity, such as carbon in organolead compounds. In these, the 6s and 6p orbitals remain comparable in size, and sp^{3} hybridization remains energetically favorable, making lead predominantly tetravalent in such cases.

The electronegativity values further reflect this behavior: lead(II) has a value of 1.87, and lead(IV) has 2.33. This represents a reversal in the general trend of increasing stability of the +4 oxidation state down the carbon group; by comparison, tin has electronegativities of 1.80 (+2 state) and 1.96 (+4 state).

==== Lead(II) ====
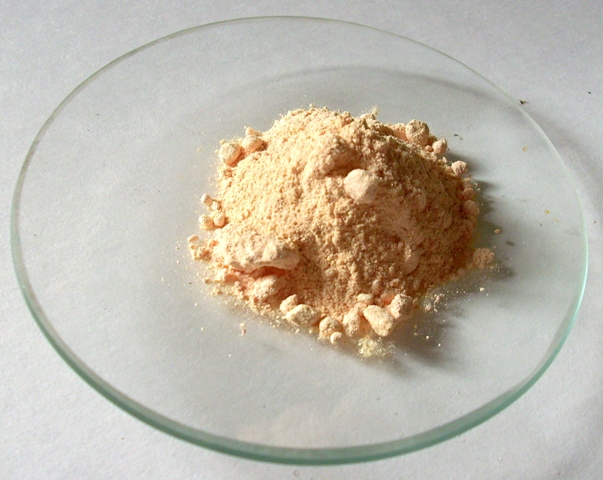
Lead(II) oxide

Lead(II) compounds are characteristic of the inorganic chemistry of lead. Even strong oxidizing agents like fluorine and chlorine react with lead to give only PbF_{2} and PbCl_{2}. Lead(II) ions are usually colorless in solution, and partially hydrolyze to form Pb(OH)^{+} and finally [Pb_{4}(OH)_{4}]^{4+} (in which the hydroxyl ions act as bridging ligands), but are not reducing agents as tin(II) ions are. Techniques for identifying the presence of the Pb^{2+} ion in water generally rely on the precipitation of lead(II) chloride using dilute hydrochloric acid. As the chloride salt is sparingly soluble in water, in very dilute solutions the precipitation of lead(II) sulfide is instead achieved by bubbling hydrogen sulfide through the solution.

Lead monoxide exists in two polymorphs, litharge α-PbO (red) and massicot β-PbO (yellow), the latter being stable only above around 488 °C. Litharge is the most commonly used inorganic compound of lead. There is no lead(II) hydroxide; increasing the pH of solutions of lead(II) salts leads to hydrolysis and condensation. Lead commonly reacts with heavier chalcogens. Lead sulfide is a semiconductor, a photoconductor, and an extremely sensitive infrared radiation detector. The other two chalcogenides, lead selenide and lead telluride, are likewise photoconducting. They are unusual in that their color becomes lighter going down the group.

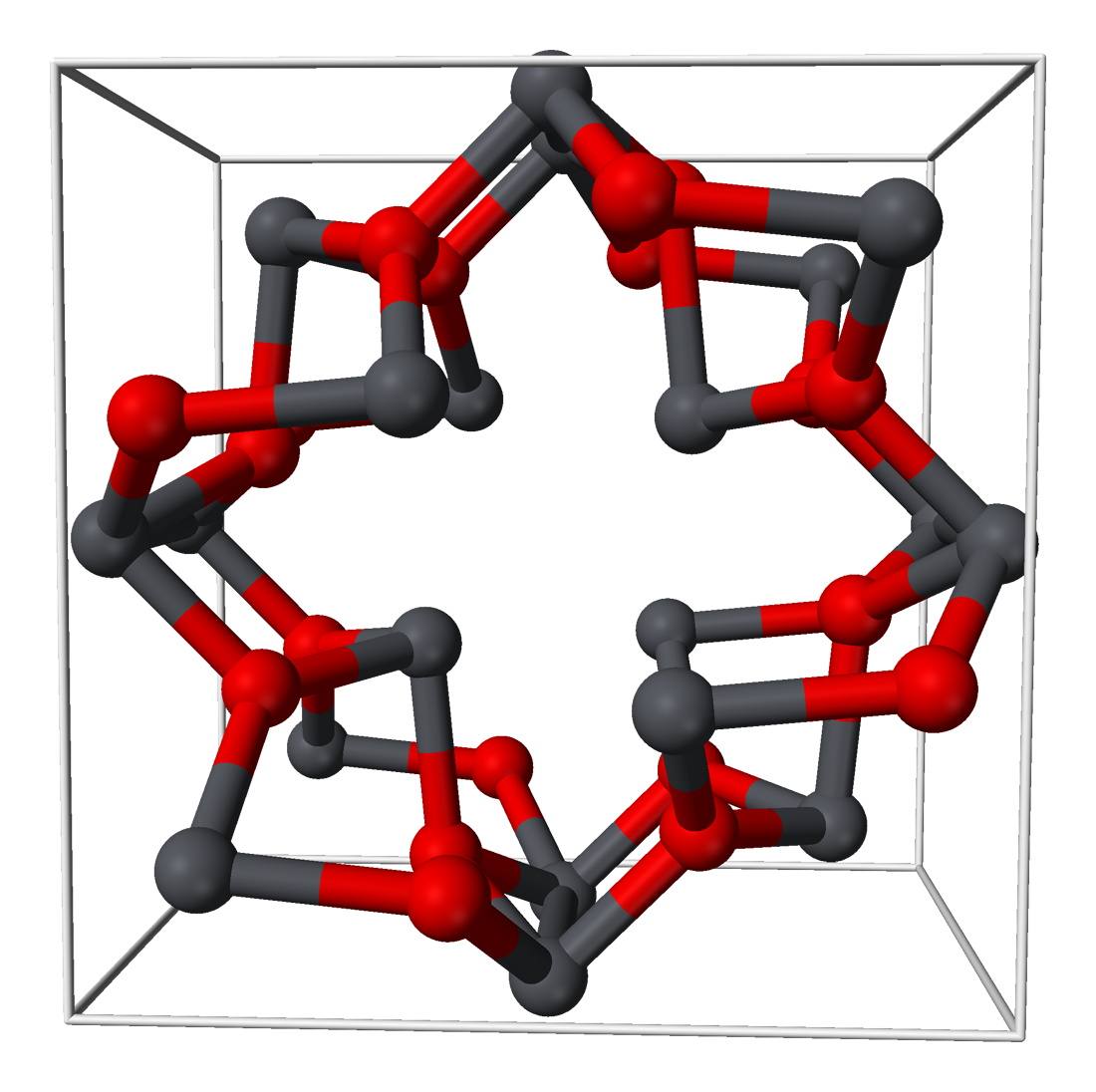
Lead and oxygen in a tetragonal unit cell of lead(II,IV) oxide

Lead dihalides are well-characterized; this includes the diastatide and mixed halides, such as PbFCl. The relative insolubility of the latter forms a useful basis for the gravimetric determination of fluorine. The difluoride was the first solid ionically conducting compound to be discovered (in 1834, by Michael Faraday). The other dihalides decompose on exposure to ultraviolet or visible light, especially the diiodide. Many lead(II) pseudohalides are known, such as the cyanide, cyanate, and thiocyanate. Lead(II) forms an extensive variety of halide coordination complexes, such as [PbCl_{4}]^{2−}, [PbCl_{6}]^{4−}, and the [Pb_{2}Cl_{9}]_{n}^{5n−} chain anion.

Lead(II) sulfate is insoluble in water, like the sulfates of other heavy divalent cations. Lead(II) nitrate and lead(II) acetate are very soluble, and this is exploited in the synthesis of other lead compounds.

==== Lead(IV) ====
Few inorganic lead(IV) compounds are known. They are only formed in highly oxidizing solutions and do not normally exist under standard conditions. Lead(II) oxide gives a mixed oxide on further oxidation, Pb_{3}O_{4}. It is described as lead(II,IV) oxide, or structurally 2PbO·PbO_{2}, and is the best-known mixed valence lead compound. Lead dioxide is a strong oxidizing agent, capable of oxidizing hydrochloric acid to chlorine gas. This is because the expected PbCl_{4} that would be produced is unstable and spontaneously decomposes to PbCl_{2} and Cl_{2}. Analogously to lead monoxide, lead dioxide is capable of forming plumbate anions. Lead disulfide and lead diselenide are only stable at high pressures. Lead tetrafluoride, a yellow crystalline powder, is stable, but less so than the difluoride. Lead tetrachloride (a yellow oil) decomposes at room temperature, lead tetrabromide is less stable still, and the existence of lead tetraiodide is questionable.

==== Other oxidation states ====
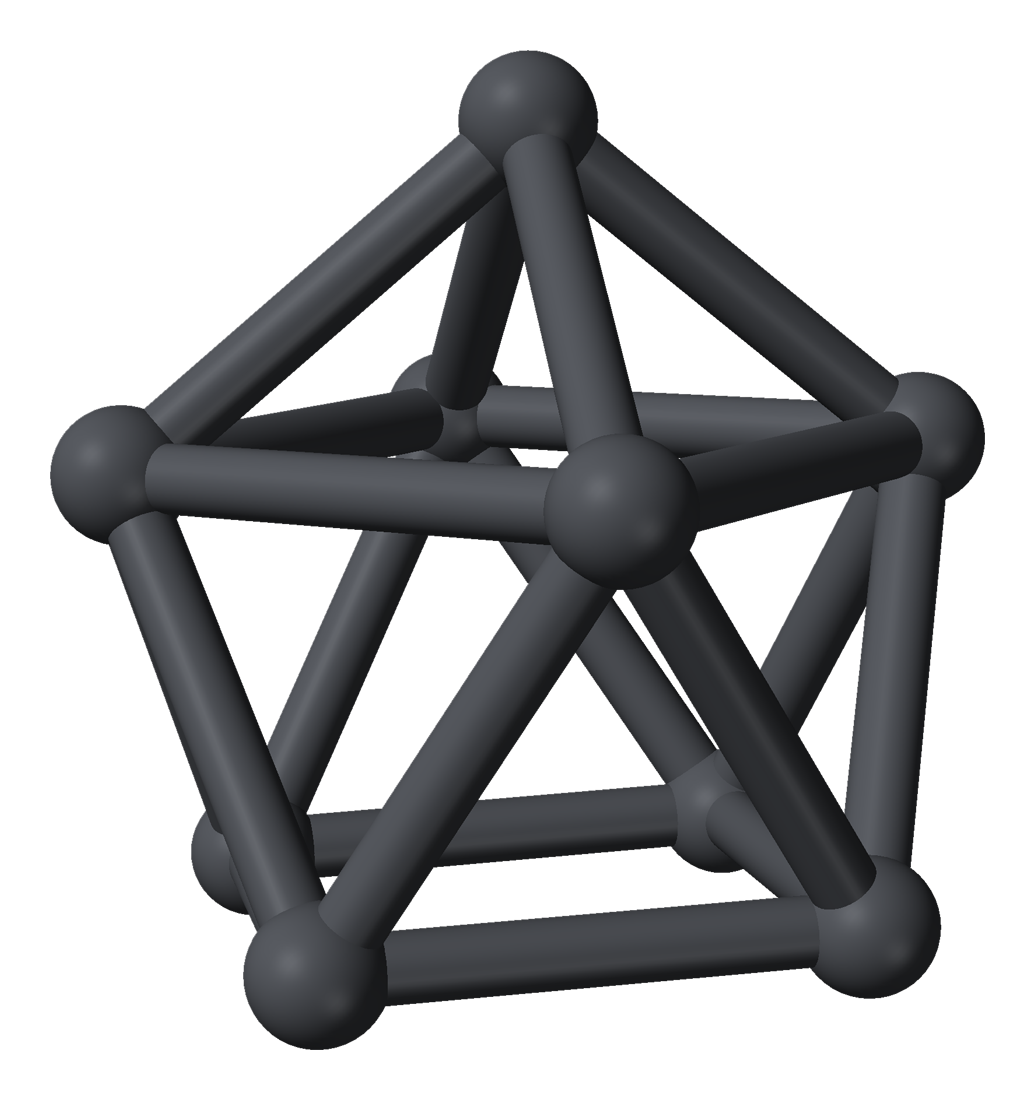
The capped square antiprismatic anion [Pb_{9}]^{4−} from [K(18-crown-6)]_{2}K_{2}Pb_{9}·(en)_{1.5}

Some lead compounds exist in formal oxidation states other than +4 or +2. Lead(III) may be obtained, as an intermediate between lead(II) and lead(IV), in larger organolead complexes; this oxidation state is not stable, as both the lead(III) ion and the larger complexes containing it are radicals. The same applies for lead(I), which can be found in such radical species.

Numerous mixed lead(II,IV) oxides are known. When PbO_{2} is heated in air, it becomes Pb_{12}O_{19} at 293 °C, Pb_{12}O_{17} at 351 °C, Pb_{3}O_{4} at 374 °C, and finally PbO at 605 °C. A further sesquioxide, Pb_{2}O_{3}, can be obtained at high pressure, along with several non-stoichiometric phases. Many of them show defective fluorite structures in which some oxygen atoms are replaced by vacancies: PbO can be considered as having such a structure, with every alternate layer of oxygen atoms absent.

Negative oxidation states can occur as Zintl phases, as either free lead anions, as in Ba_{2}Pb, with lead formally being lead(−IV), or in oxygen-sensitive ring-shaped or polyhedral cluster ions such as the trigonal bipyramidal Pb_{5}^{2−} ion, where two lead atoms are lead(−I) and three are lead(0). In such anions, each atom is at a polyhedral vertex and contributes two electrons to each covalent bond along an edge from their sp^{3} hybrid orbitals, the other two being an external lone pair. They may be made in liquid ammonia via the reduction of lead by sodium.

=== Organolead ===
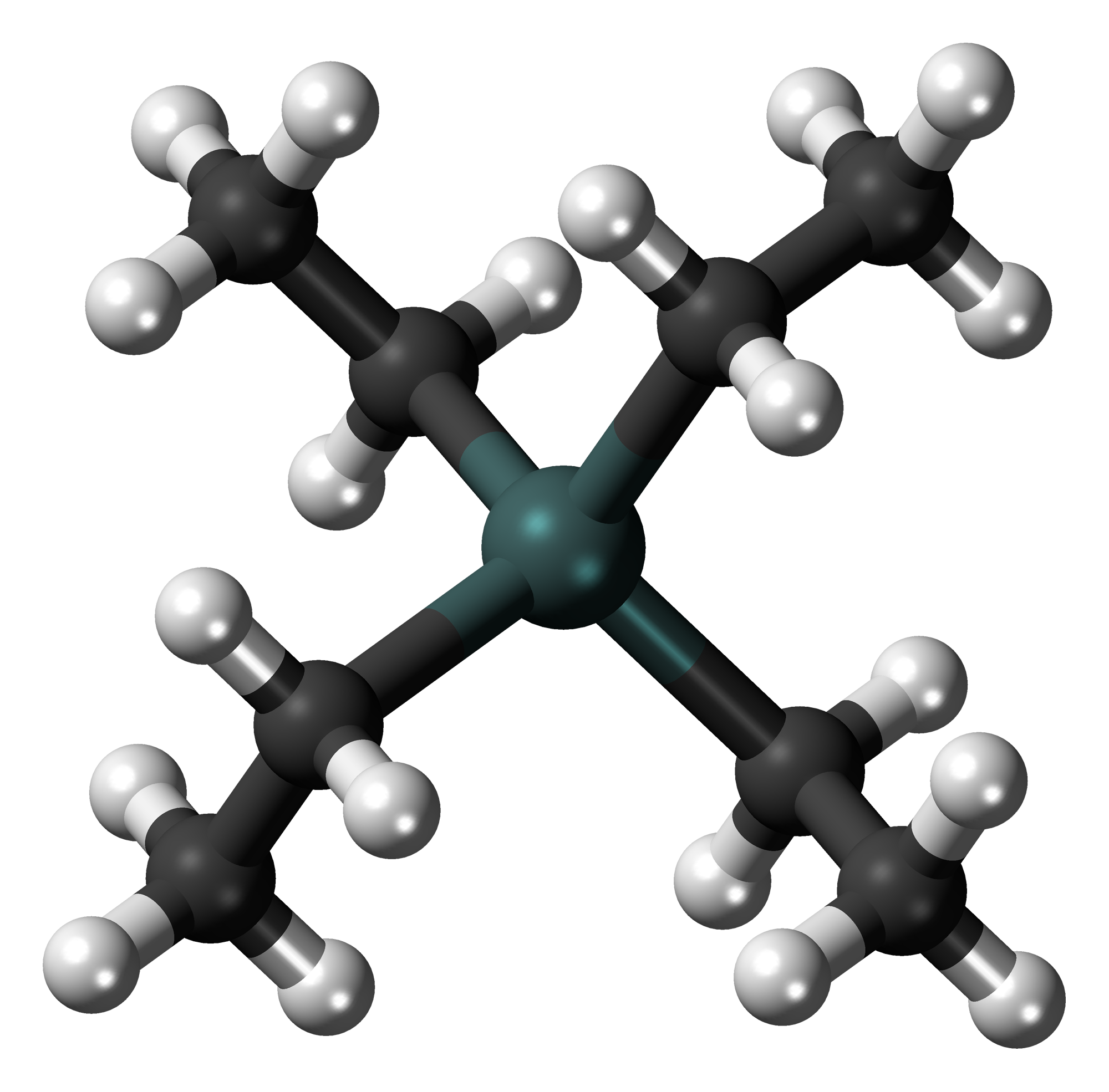
Structure of a tetraethyllead molecule: Carbon Hydrogen Lead

Lead can form multiply-bonded chains, a property it shares with its lighter homologs in the carbon group. Its capacity to do so is much less because the Pb–Pb bond energy is over three and a half times lower than that of the C–C bond. With itself, lead can build metal–metal bonds of an order up to three. With carbon, lead forms organolead compounds similar to, but generally less stable than, typical organic compounds (due to the Pb–C bond being rather weak). This makes the organometallic chemistry of lead far less wide-ranging than that of tin. Lead predominantly forms organolead(IV) compounds, even when starting with inorganic lead(II) reactants; very few organolead(II) compounds are known. The most well-characterized exceptions are Pb[CH(SiMe_{3})_{2}]_{2} and plumbocene.

The lead analog of the simplest organic compound, methane, is plumbane. Plumbane may be obtained in a reaction between metallic lead and atomic hydrogen. Two simple derivatives, tetramethyllead and tetraethyllead, are the best-known organolead compounds. These compounds are relatively stable: tetraethyllead only starts to decompose if heated or if exposed to sunlight or ultraviolet light. (Note: Tetraphenyllead is even more thermally stable, decomposing at 270 °C.) With sodium metal, lead readily forms an equimolar alloy that reacts with alkyl halides to form organometallic compounds such as tetraethyllead. The oxidizing nature of many organolead compounds is usefully exploited: lead tetraacetate is an important laboratory reagent for oxidation in organic synthesis. Tetraethyllead, once added to automotive gasoline, was produced in larger quantities than any other organometallic compound, and is still widely used in fuel for small aircraft. Other organolead compounds are less chemically stable. For many organic compounds, a lead analog does not exist.

== Origin and occurrence ==
Solar System abundances
| Atomic number | Element | Relative amount |
|---|---|---|
| 42 | Molybdenum | 0.798 |
| 46 | Palladium | 0.440 |
| 50 | Tin | 1.146 |
| 78 | Platinum | 0.417 |
| 80 | Mercury | 0.127 |
| 82 | Lead | 1 |
| 90 | Thorium | 0.011 |
| 92 | Uranium | 0.003 |

=== In space ===
Lead's per-particle abundance in the Solar System is 0.121 ppb (parts per billion). (Note: Abundances in the source are listed relative to silicon rather than in per-particle notation. The sum of all elements per 10^{6} parts of silicon is 2.6682×10^{10} parts; lead comprises 3.258 parts.) This figure is two and a half times higher than that of platinum, eight times more than mercury, and seventeen times more than gold. The amount of lead in the universe is slowly increasing as most heavier atoms (all of which are unstable) gradually decay to lead. The abundance of lead in the Solar System since its formation 4.5 billion years ago has increased by about 0.75%. The Solar System abundances table shows that lead, despite its relatively high atomic number, is more prevalent than most other elements with atomic numbers greater than 40.

Primordial lead—which comprises the isotopes lead-204, lead-206, lead-207, and lead-208—was mostly created as a result of repetitive neutron capture processes occurring in stars. The two main modes of capture are the s- and r-processes.

In the s-process (s is for "slow"), captures are separated by years or decades, allowing less stable nuclei to undergo beta decay. A stable thallium-203 nucleus can capture a neutron and become thallium-204; this undergoes beta decay to give stable lead-204; on capturing another neutron, it becomes lead-205, which has a half-life of around 17 million years. Further captures result in lead-206, lead-207, and lead-208. On capturing another neutron, lead-208 becomes lead-209, which quickly decays into bismuth-209. On capturing another neutron, bismuth-209 becomes bismuth-210, and this beta decays to polonium-210, which alpha decays to lead-206. The cycle hence ends at lead-206, lead-207, lead-208, and bismuth-209.

Chart of the final part of the s-process, from mercury to polonium. Red lines and circles represent neutron captures; blue arrows represent beta decays; the green arrow represents an alpha decay; cyan arrows represent electron captures.

In the r-process (r is for "rapid"), captures happen faster than nuclei can decay. This occurs in environments with a high neutron density, such as a supernova or the merger of two neutron stars. The neutron flux involved may be on the order of 10^{22} neutrons per square centimeter per second. The r-process does not form as much lead as the s-process. It tends to stop once neutron-rich nuclei reach 126 neutrons. At this point, the neutrons are arranged in complete shells in the atomic nucleus, and it becomes harder to energetically accommodate more of them. When the neutron flux subsides, these nuclei beta decay into stable isotopes of osmium, iridium, and platinum.

=== On Earth ===
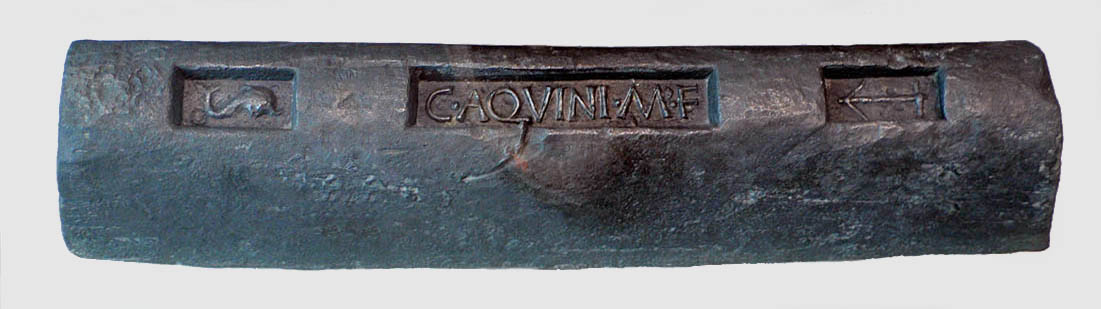
Lead ingot from Roman times, Cartagena, Spain

Lead is classified as a chalcophile under the Goldschmidt classification, meaning it is generally found combined with sulfur. It rarely occurs in its native, metallic form. Many lead minerals are relatively light and, over the course of the Earth's history, have remained in the crust instead of sinking deeper into the Earth's interior. This accounts for lead's relatively high crustal abundance of 14 ppm; it is the 36th most abundant element in the crust. (Note: Elemental abundance figures are estimates and their details may vary from source to source.)

The main lead-bearing mineral is galena (PbS), which is mostly found with zinc ores. Most other lead minerals are related to galena in some way; boulangerite, Pb_{5}Sb_{4}S_{11}, is a mixed sulfide derived from galena; anglesite, PbSO_{4}, is a product of galena oxidation; and cerussite or white lead ore, PbCO_{3}, is a decomposition product of galena. Arsenic, tin, antimony, silver, gold, copper, and bismuth are common impurities in lead minerals.

Lead is a fairly common element in the Earth's crust for its high atomic number (82). Most elements of atomic number greater than 40 are less abundant.

World lead resources exceed two billion tons. Significant deposits are located in Australia, China, Ireland, Mexico, Peru, Portugal, Russia, United States. Global reserves—resources that are economically feasible to extract—totaled 88 million tons in 2016, of which Australia had 35 million, China 17 million, Russia 6.4 million.

Typical background concentrations of lead do not exceed 0.1 μg/m^{3} in the atmosphere; 100 mg/kg in soil; 4 mg/kg in vegetation, 5 μg/L in fresh water and seawater.

== Etymology ==
The modern English word lead is of Germanic origin; it comes from the Middle English leed and Old English lēad (with the macron above the "e" signifying that the vowel sound of that letter is long). The Old English word is derived from the hypothetical reconstructed Proto-Germanic *lauda- ('lead'). According to linguistic theory, this word bore descendants in multiple Germanic languages of exactly the same meaning.

There is no consensus on the origin of the Proto-Germanic *lauda-. One hypothesis suggests it is derived from Proto-Indo-European *lAudh- ('lead'; capitalization of the vowel is equivalent to the macron). Another hypothesis suggests it is borrowed from Proto-Celtic *ɸloud-io- ('lead'). This word is related to the Latin plumbum, which gave the element its chemical symbol Pb. The word *ɸloud-io- is thought to be the origin of Proto-Germanic *bliwa- (which also means 'lead'), from which stemmed the German Blei.

The name of the chemical element is not related to the verb of the same spelling, which is derived from Proto-Germanic *laidijan- ('to lead').

== History ==
Lead was first smelted in the 7th millennium BC, when lead was widely adopted because of its ease of working and its association with silver ores. It became especially important in the ancient Mediterranean, where Roman production reached unprecedented levels. After the decline and fall of the Western Roman Empire, lead use expanded in Asia and later revived in Europe during the Middle Ages and the Industrial Revolution. Growing awareness of lead's toxicity in the modern era led to regulatory restrictions, although the metal remains significant in certain industrial applications.

== Production ==
Lead production

Primary production of lead since 1840

As of 2014, production of lead is increasing worldwide due to its use in lead–acid batteries. There are two major categories of production: primary from mined ores, and secondary from scrap. In 2014, 4.58 million metric tons came from primary production and 5.64 million from secondary production. The top three producers of mined lead concentrate in that year were China, Australia, and United States. The top three producers of refined lead were China, United States, and India. According to the Metal Stocks in Society report of 2010, the total amount of lead in use, stockpiled, discarded, or dissipated into the environment, on a global basis, is 8 kg per capita. Much of this is in more developed countries (20–150 kg per capita) rather than less developed ones (1–4 kg per capita). In 2022, the annual global production of lead was about twelve million tonnes, about two thirds of which was from recycling.

The primary and secondary lead production processes are similar. Some primary production plants now supplement their operations with scrap lead, and this trend is likely to increase in the future. Given adequate techniques, lead obtained via secondary processes is indistinguishable from lead obtained via primary processes. Scrap lead from the building trade is usually fairly clean and is re-melted without the need for smelting, though refining is sometimes needed. Secondary lead production is therefore cheaper, in terms of energy requirements, than is primary production, often by 50% or more.

=== Primary ===
Most lead ores contain a low percentage of lead (rich ores have a typical content of 3–8%) which must be concentrated for extraction. During initial processing, ores typically undergo crushing, dense-medium separation, grinding, froth flotation, drying. The resulting concentrate, which has a lead content of 30–80% by mass (regularly 50–60%), is then turned into (impure) lead metal.

There are two main ways of doing this: a two-stage process involving roasting followed by blast furnace extraction, carried out in separate vessels; or a direct process in which the extraction of the concentrate occurs in a single vessel. The latter has become the most common route, though the former is still significant.

World's largest mining countries of lead, 2016
| Country | Output (thousand tons) |
|---|---|
| China | 2,400 |
| Australia | 500 |
| United States | 335 |
| Peru | 310 |
| Mexico | 250 |
| Russia | 225 |
| India | 135 |
| Bolivia | 80 |
| Sweden | 76 |
| Turkey | 75 |
| Iran | 41 |
| Kazakhstan | 41 |
| Poland | 40 |
| South Africa | 40 |
| North Korea | 35 |
| Ireland | 33 |
| Macedonia | 33 |
| Other countries | 170 |

==== Two-stage process ====
First, the sulfide concentrate is roasted in air to oxidize the lead sulfide:

2 PbS(s) + 3 O_{2}(g) → 2 PbO(s) + 2 SO_{2}(g)↑

As the original concentrate was not pure lead sulfide, roasting yields not only the desired lead(II) oxide, but a mixture of oxides, sulfates, and silicates of lead and of the other metals contained in the ore. This impure lead oxide is reduced in a coke-fired blast furnace to the (again, impure) metal:

2 PbO(s) + C(s) → 2 Pb(s) + CO_{2}(g)↑

Impurities are mostly arsenic, antimony, bismuth, zinc, copper, silver, and gold. Typically they are removed in a series of pyrometallurgical processes. The melt is treated in a reverberatory furnace with air, steam, sulfur, which oxidizes the impurities except for silver, gold, bismuth. Oxidized contaminants float to the top of the melt and are skimmed off. Metallic silver and gold are removed and recovered economically by means of the Parkes process, in which zinc is added to lead. Zinc, which is immiscible in lead, dissolves the silver and gold. The zinc solution can be separated from the lead, and the silver and gold retrieved. De-silvered lead is freed of bismuth by the Betterton–Kroll process, treating it with metallic calcium and magnesium. The resulting bismuth dross can be skimmed off.

Alternatively to the pyrometallurgical processes, very pure lead can be obtained by processing smelted lead electrolytically using the Betts process. Anodes of impure lead and cathodes of pure lead are placed in an electrolyte of lead fluorosilicate (PbSiF_{6}). Once electrical potential is applied, impure lead at the anode dissolves and plates onto the cathode, leaving the majority of the impurities in solution. This is a high-cost process and thus mostly reserved for refining bullion containing high percentages of impurities.

==== Direct process ====
In this process, lead bullion and slag is obtained directly from lead concentrates. The lead sulfide concentrate is melted in a furnace and oxidized, forming lead monoxide. Carbon (as coke or coal gas (Note: Gaseous by-product of the coking process, containing carbon monoxide, hydrogen and methane; used as a fuel.)) is added to the molten charge along with fluxing agents. The lead monoxide is thereby reduced to metallic lead, in the midst of a slag rich in lead monoxide.

If the input is rich in lead, as much as 80% of the original lead can be obtained as bullion; the remaining 20% forms a slag rich in lead monoxide. For a low-grade feed, all of the lead can be oxidized to a high-lead slag. Metallic lead is further obtained from the high-lead (25–40%) slags via submerged fuel combustion or injection, reduction assisted by an electric furnace, or a combination of both.

==== Alternatives ====
Research on a cleaner, less energy-intensive lead extraction process continues; a major drawback is that either too much lead is lost as waste, or the alternatives result in a high sulfur content in the resulting lead metal. Hydrometallurgical extraction, in which anodes of impure lead are immersed into an electrolyte and pure lead is deposited (electrowound) onto cathodes, is a technique that may have potential, but is not currently economical except in cases where electricity is very cheap.

=== Secondary ===
Smelting, which is an essential part of the primary production, is often skipped during secondary production. It is only performed when metallic lead has undergone significant oxidation. The process is similar to that of primary production in either a blast furnace or a rotary furnace, with the essential difference being the greater variability of yields: blast furnaces produce hard lead (10% antimony) while reverberatory and rotary kiln furnaces produce semisoft lead (3–4% antimony).

The ISASMELT process is a more recent smelting method that may act as an extension to primary production; battery paste from spent lead–acid batteries (containing lead sulfate and lead oxides) has its sulfate removed by treating it with alkali, and is then treated in a coal-fueled furnace in the presence of oxygen, which yields impure lead, with antimony the most common impurity. Refining of secondary lead is similar to that of primary lead; some refining processes may be skipped depending on the material recycled and its potential contamination.

Of the sources of lead for recycling, lead–acid batteries are the most important; lead pipe, sheet, and cable sheathing are also significant.

== Applications ==
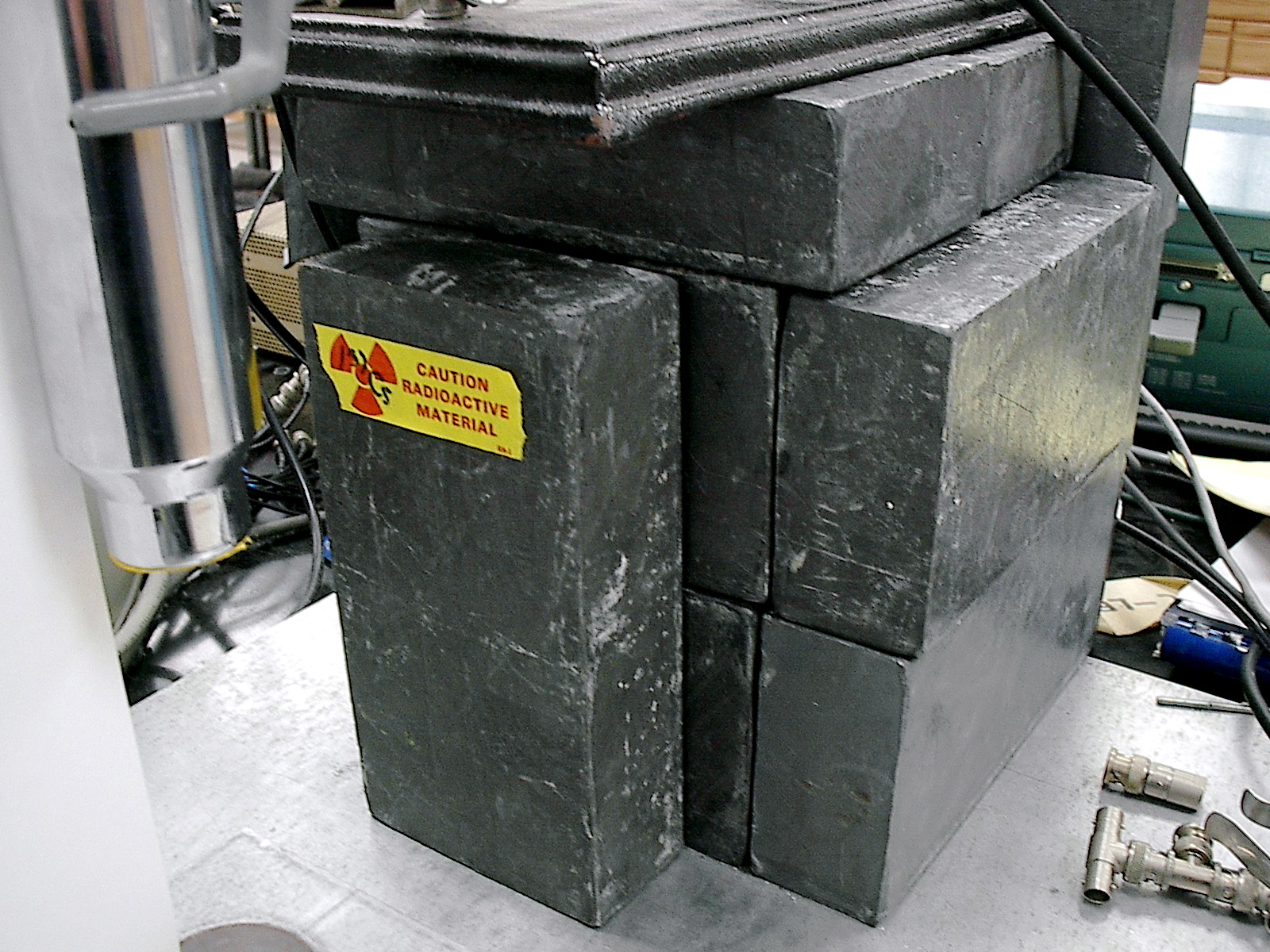
Bricks of lead (alloyed with 4% antimony) are used as radiation shielding.

Contrary to popular belief, pencil leads in wooden pencils have never been made from lead. When the pencil originated as a wrapped graphite writing tool, the particular type of graphite used was named plumbago (literally, lead mockup).

=== Elemental form ===
Lead metal has several useful mechanical properties, including high density, low melting point, ductility, and relative inertness. Many metals are superior to lead in some of these aspects but are generally less common and more difficult to extract from parent ores. Lead's toxicity has led to its phasing out for some uses.

Lead was used to cover the ramparts protecting the ascent to the Alamut Castle in Persia, which could absorb attacks by siege engines.

Lead has been used for bullets since their invention in the Middle Ages. It is inexpensive; its low melting point means small arms ammunition and shotgun pellets can be cast with minimal technical equipment; and it is denser than other common metals, which allows for better retention of velocity. It remains the main material for bullets, alloyed with other metals as hardeners. Concerns have been raised that lead bullets used for hunting can damage the environment. (Note: California began banning lead bullets for hunting on that basis in July 2015.) Shotgun cartridges used for waterfowl hunting must today be lead-free in the United States, Canada, and in Europe.

Lead's high density and resistance to corrosion have been exploited in a number of related applications. It is used as ballast in sailboat keels; its density allows it to take up a small volume and minimize water resistance, thus counterbalancing the heeling effect of wind on the sails. It is used in scuba diving weight belts to counteract the diver's buoyancy. In 1993, the base of the Leaning Tower of Pisa was stabilized with 600 tonnes of lead. Because of its corrosion resistance, lead is used as a protective sheath for underwater cables.

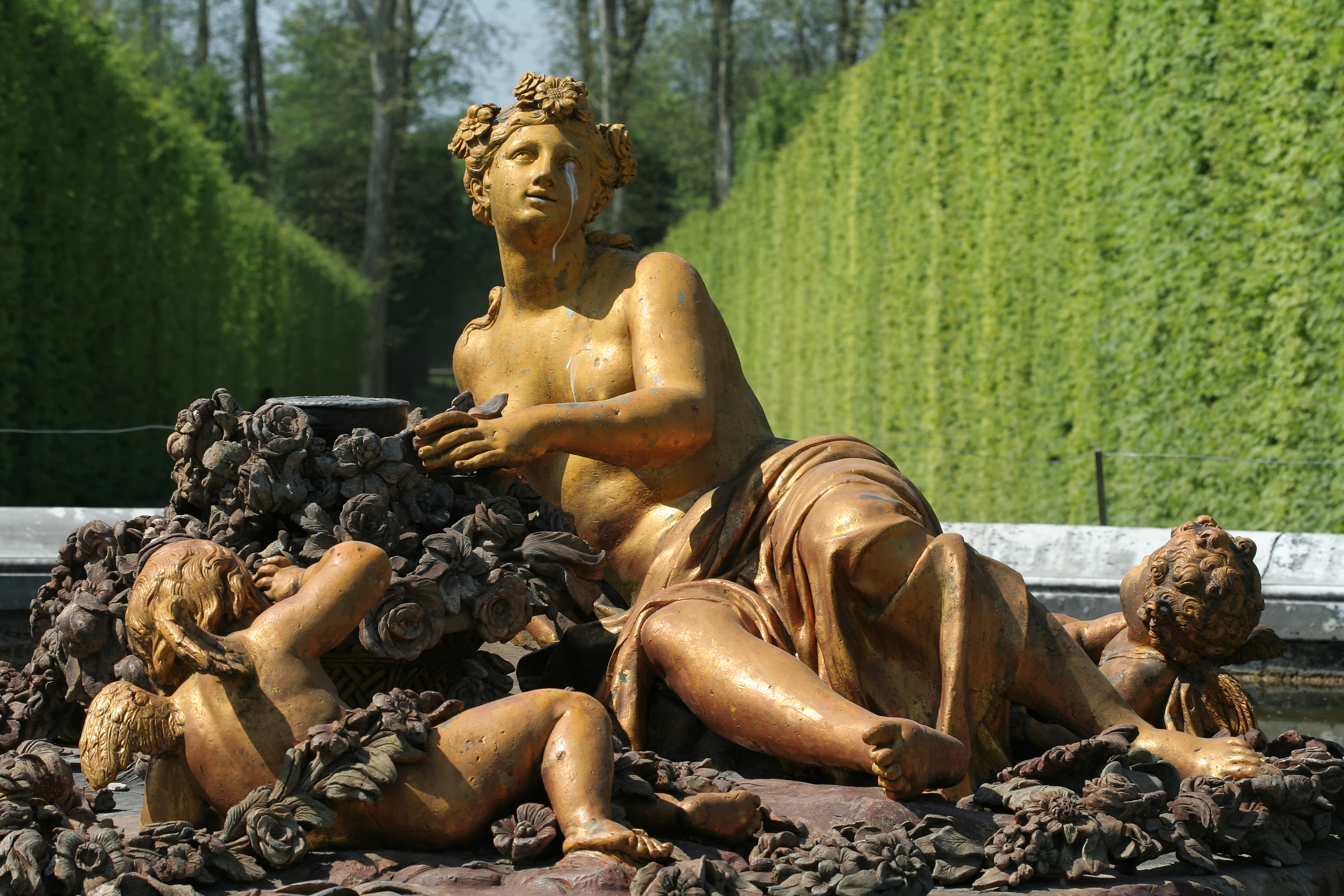
A 17th-century gold-coated lead sculpture

Lead has many uses in the construction industry; lead sheets are used as architectural metals in roofing material, cladding, flashing, gutters and gutter joints, roof parapets. Lead is still used in statues and sculptures, (Note: For example, a firm "...producing quality [lead] garden ornament from our studio in West London for over a century".) including for armatures. In the past it was often used to balance the wheels of cars; for environmental reasons this use is being phased out in favor of other materials.

Lead is added to copper alloys, such as brass and bronze, to improve machinability and for its lubricating qualities. Being practically insoluble in copper, the lead forms solid globules in imperfections throughout the alloy, such as grain boundaries. In low concentrations, as well as acting as a lubricant, the globules hinder the formation of swarf as the alloy is worked, thereby improving machinability. Copper alloys with larger concentrations of lead are used in bearings. The lead provides lubrication, and the copper provides the load-bearing support.

Lead's high density, atomic number, and formability form the basis for use of lead as a barrier that absorbs sound, vibration, and radiation. Lead has no natural resonance frequencies; as a result, sheet-lead is used as a sound deadening layer in the walls, floors, and ceilings of sound studios. Organ pipes are often made from a lead alloy, mixed with various amounts of tin to control the tone of each pipe. Lead is an established shielding material from radiation in nuclear science and in X-ray rooms due to its density (which gives it a high attenuation coefficient) as well as its remarkably high mass attenuation coefficient (it attenuates per unit mass better than many other dense materials). Molten lead has been used as a coolant for lead-cooled fast reactors.

=== Batteries ===
The largest use of lead in the early 21st century is in lead–acid batteries. The lead in batteries undergoes no direct contact with humans, so there are fewer toxicity concerns. (Note: Potential injuries to regular users of such batteries are not related to lead's toxicity.) People who work in lead battery production or recycling plants may be exposed to lead dust and inhale it. The reactions in the battery between lead, lead dioxide, and sulfuric acid provide a reliable source of voltage. (Note: See for details on how a lead–acid battery works.) Supercapacitors incorporating lead–acid batteries have been installed in kilowatt and megawatt scale applications in Australia, Japan, and the United States in frequency regulation, solar smoothing and shifting, wind smoothing, and other applications. These batteries have lower energy density and charge-discharge efficiency than lithium-ion batteries, but are significantly cheaper.

=== Coating for cables ===
Lead is used in high voltage power cables as shell material to prevent water diffusion into insulation; this use is decreasing as lead is being phased out. Its use in solder for electronics is also being phased out by some countries to reduce the amount of environmentally hazardous waste.

=== Compounds ===
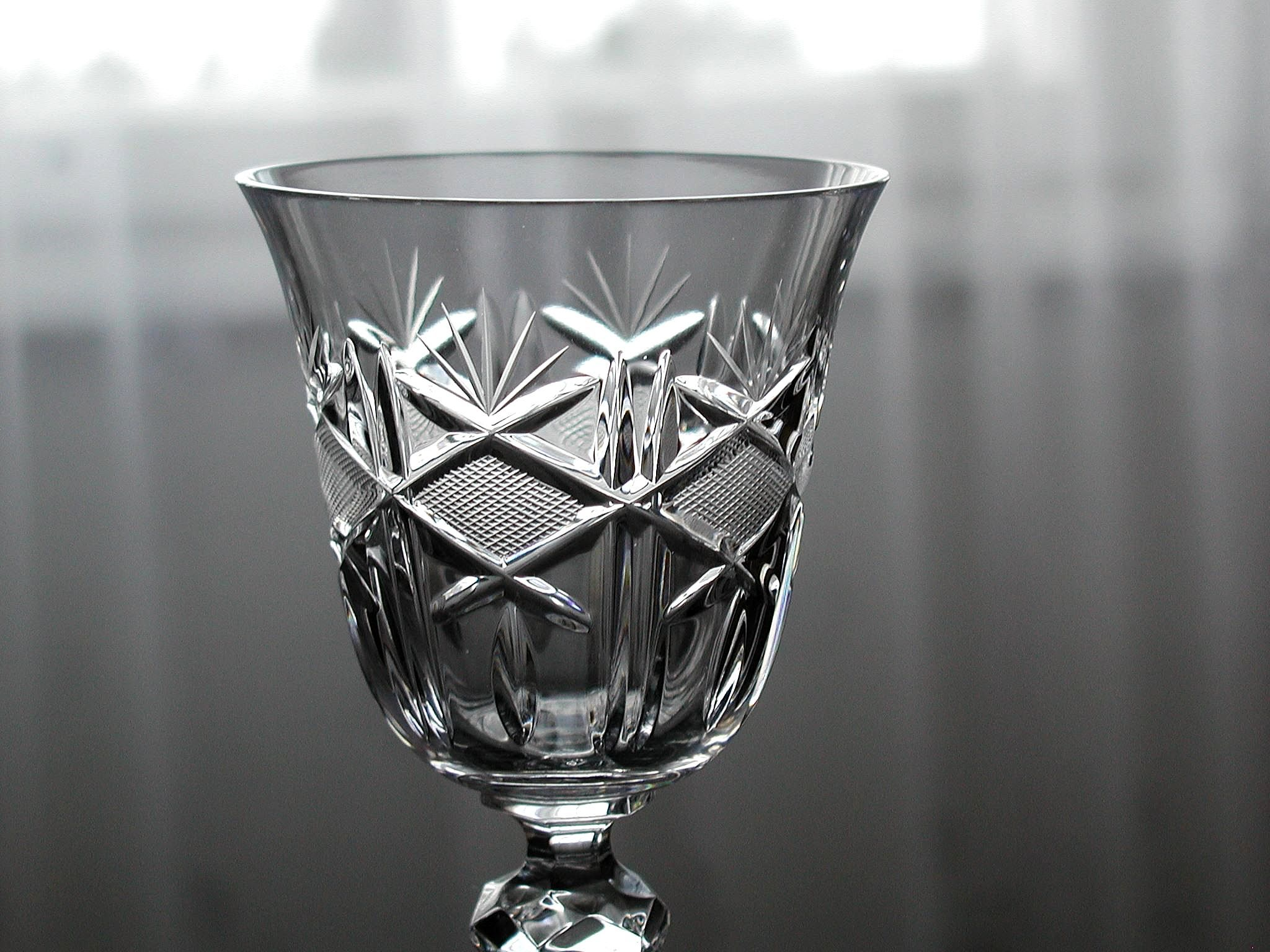
Lead glass

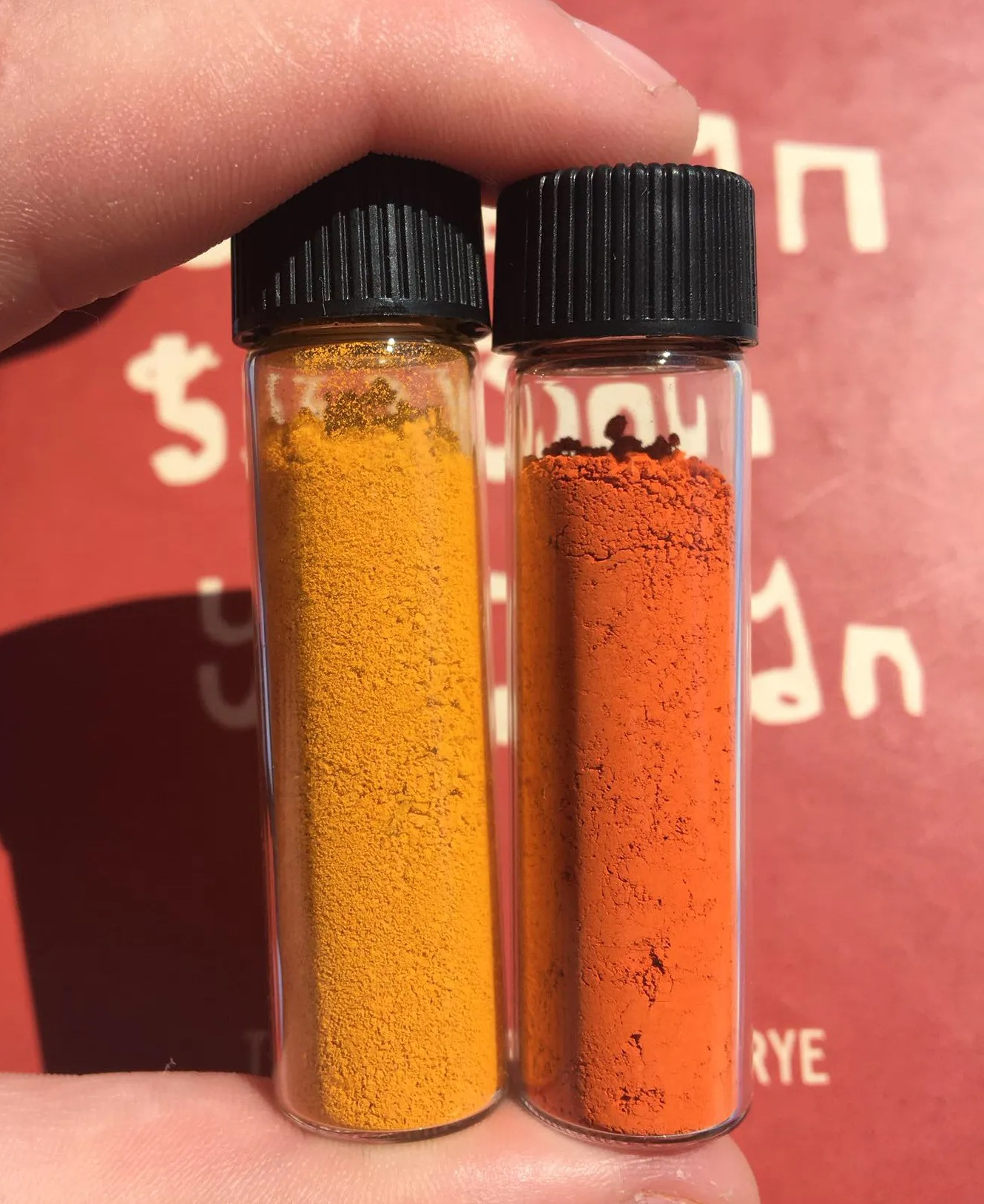
Lead yellow and lead red

In addition to being the main application for lead metal, lead–acid batteries are also the main consumer of lead compounds. The energy storage/release reaction used in these devices involves lead sulfate and lead dioxide:

Pb(s) + PbO_{2}(s) + 2H_{2}SO_{4}(aq) → 2PbSO_{4}(s) + 2H_{2}O(l)

Other applications of lead compounds are very specialized and often fading. Lead-based coloring agents are used in ceramic glazes and glass, especially for red and yellow shades. While lead paints are phased out in Europe and North America, they remain in use in less developed countries such as China, India, or Indonesia. Lead tetraacetate and lead dioxide are used as oxidizing agents in organic chemistry. Lead is frequently used in the polyvinyl chloride coating of electrical cords. It can be used to treat candle wicks to ensure a longer, more even burn. Because of its toxicity, European and North American manufacturers use alternatives such as zinc. Lead glass is composed of 12–28% lead oxide, changing its optical characteristics and reducing the transmission of ionizing radiation, a property used in old TVs and computer monitors with cathode-ray tubes. Lead-based semiconductors such as lead telluride and lead selenide are used in photovoltaic cells and infrared detectors.

=== Historical Preservation ===
Museums have an interest in preventing corrosion. Lead is contained in many historical artefacts, and lead corroding agents can be present in the air: Aldehydes, Organic Acids such as Acetic acid or Formic acid, and Acid gases. The Oddy test is an environment of accelerated corrosion, using lead and other metals to determine the presence of corroding agents.

== Biological effects ==
Lead
Hazards
- GHS labelling
| Pictograms | (GHS08: Health hazard) (GHS09: Environmental hazard) |
| Signal word | Danger |
| Hazard statements | H302, H332, H351, H360Df, H373, H410 |
| Precautionary statements | P201, P261, P273, P304, P308, P312, P313, P340, P391 |
| NFPA 704 (fire diamond) | 2 0 0 |

Lead has no confirmed biological role, and there is no confirmed safe level of lead exposure. A 2009 Canadian–American study concluded that even at levels that are considered to pose little to no risk, lead may cause "adverse mental health outcomes". Its prevalence in the human body—at an adult average of 120 mg (Note: Rates vary greatly by country.)—is nevertheless exceeded only by zinc (2500 mg) and iron (4000 mg) among the heavy metals. Lead salts are very efficiently absorbed by the body. A small amount of lead (1%) is stored in bones; the rest is excreted in urine and feces within a few weeks of exposure. Only about a third of lead is excreted by a child. Continual exposure may result in the bioaccumulation of lead.

=== Toxicity ===
Lead is a highly poisonous metal (whether inhaled or swallowed), affecting almost every organ and system in the human body. At airborne levels of 100 mg/m^{3}, it is immediately dangerous to life and health. Most ingested lead is absorbed into the bloodstream. The primary cause of its toxicity is its predilection for interfering with the proper functioning of enzymes. It does so by binding to the sulfhydryl groups found on many enzymes, or mimicking and displacing other metals that act as cofactors in many enzymatic reactions. The essential metals that lead interacts with include calcium, iron, and zinc. High levels of calcium and iron tend to provide some protection from lead poisoning; low levels cause increased susceptibility.

=== Effects ===
Lead can cause severe damage to the brain and kidneys and, ultimately, death. By mimicking calcium, lead can cross the blood–brain barrier. It degrades the myelin sheaths of neurons, reduces their numbers, interferes with neurotransmission routes, and decreases neuronal growth. In the human body, lead inhibits porphobilinogen synthase and ferrochelatase, preventing both porphobilinogen formation and the incorporation of iron into protoporphyrin IX, the final step in heme synthesis. This causes ineffective heme synthesis and microcytic anemia.

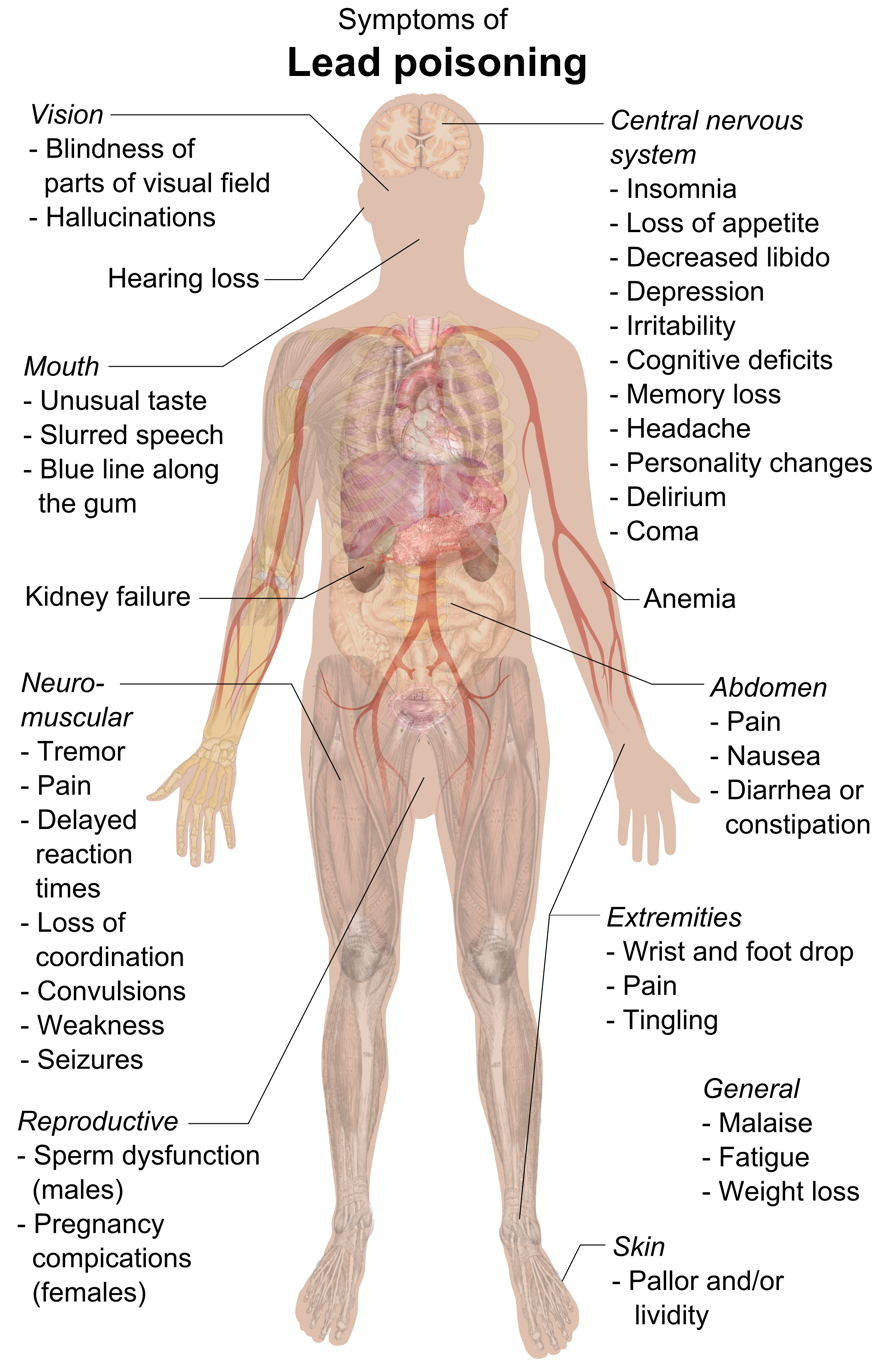
Symptoms of lead poisoning

Symptoms of lead poisoning include nephropathy, colic-like abdominal pains, and possibly weakness in the fingers, wrists, or ankles. Small blood pressure increases, particularly in middle-aged and older people, may be apparent and can cause anemia. Several studies, mostly cross-sectional, found an association between increased lead exposure and decreased heart rate variability. In pregnant women, high levels of exposure to lead may cause miscarriage. Chronic, high-level exposure has been shown to reduce fertility in males.

In a child's developing brain, lead interferes with synapse formation in the cerebral cortex, neurochemical development (including that of neurotransmitters), and the organization of ion channels. Early childhood exposure has been linked with an increased risk of sleep disturbances and excessive daytime drowsiness in later childhood. High blood levels are associated with delayed puberty in girls. The rise and fall in exposure to airborne lead from the combustion of tetraethyl lead in gasoline during the 20th century has been linked with historical increases and decreases in crime levels.

=== Exposure sources ===
Lead exposure is a global issue since lead mining and smelting, and battery manufacturing, disposal, and recycling, are common in many countries. Lead enters the body via inhalation, ingestion, or skin absorption. Almost all inhaled lead is absorbed into the body; for ingestion, the rate is 20–70%, with children absorbing a higher percentage than adults.

Poisoning typically results from ingestion of food or water contaminated with lead, and less commonly after accidental ingestion of contaminated soil, dust, or lead-based paint. Seawater products can contain lead if affected by nearby industrial waters. Fruit and vegetables can be contaminated by high levels of lead in the soils they were grown in. Soil can be contaminated through particulate accumulation from lead in pipes, lead paint, residual emissions from leaded gasoline.

The use of lead for water pipes is a problem in areas with soft or acidic water. Hard water forms insoluble protective layers on the inner surface of the pipes, whereas soft and acidic water dissolves the lead pipes. Dissolved carbon dioxide in the carried water may result in the formation of soluble lead bicarbonate; oxygenated water may similarly dissolve lead as lead(II) hydroxide. Drinking such water, over time, can cause health problems due to the toxicity of the dissolved lead. The harder the water the more calcium bicarbonate and sulfate it contains, and the more the inside of the pipes are coated with a protective layer of lead carbonate or lead sulfate.

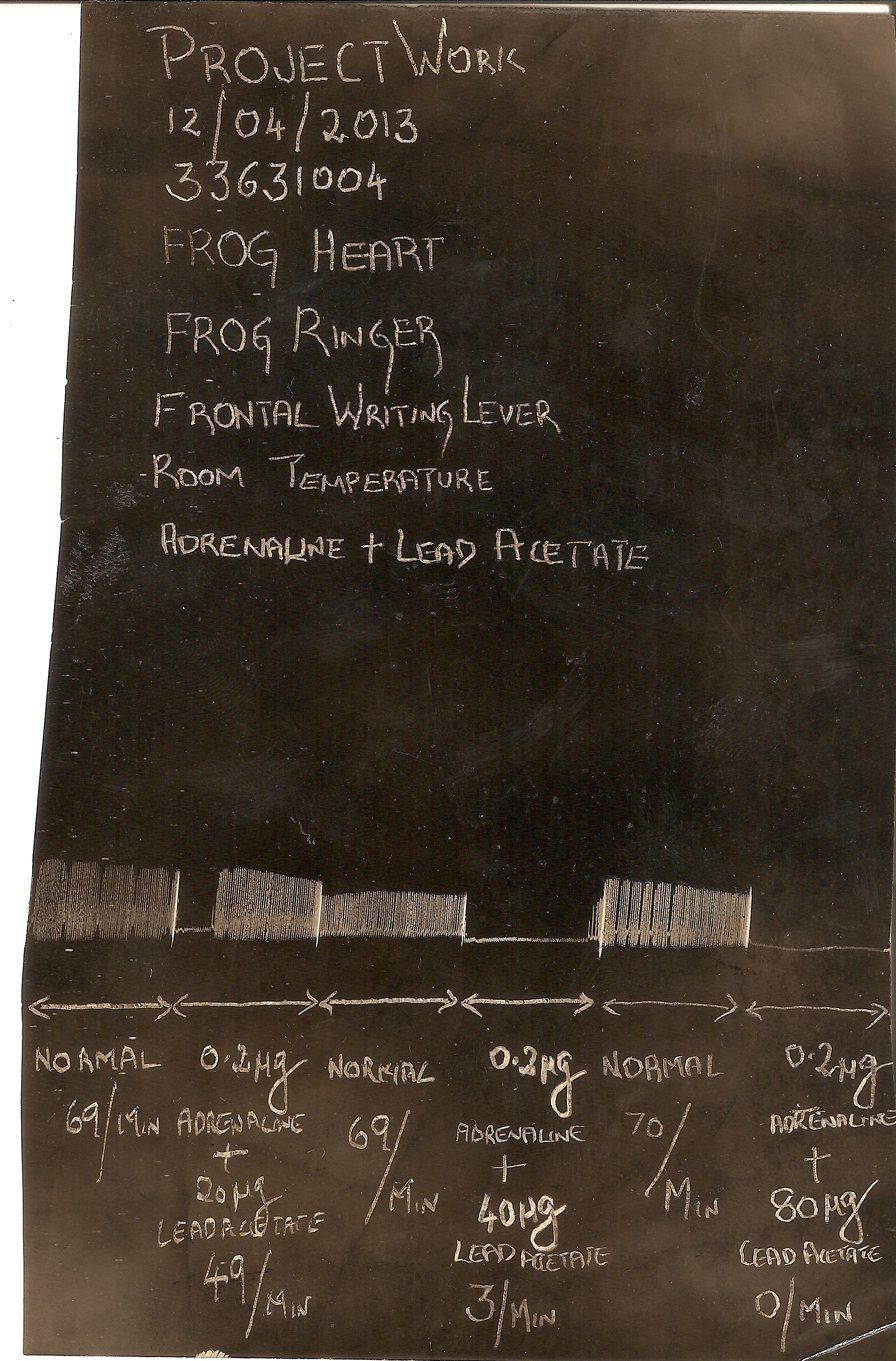
Kymographic recording of the effect of lead acetate on frog heart experimental set up

Ingestion of applied lead-based paint is the major source of exposure for children: a direct source is chewing on old painted window sills. Additionally, as lead paint on a surface deteriorates, it peels and is pulverized into dust. The dust then enters the body through hand-to-mouth contact or contaminated food or drink. Ingesting certain home remedies may result in exposure to lead or its compounds.

Inhalation is the second major exposure pathway, affecting smokers and especially workers in lead-related occupations. Cigarette smoke contains, among other toxic substances, radioactive lead-210. "As a result of EPA's regulatory efforts, levels of lead in the air [in the United States] decreased by 86 percent between 2010 and 2020." The concentration of lead in the air in the United States fell below the national standard of 0.15 μg/m^{3} in 2014.

Skin exposure may be significant for people working with organic lead compounds. The rate of skin absorption is lower for inorganic lead.

==== Lead in foods ====
Lead may be found in food when food is grown in soil that is high in lead, airborne lead contaminates the crops, animals eat lead in their diet, or lead enters the food either from what it was stored or cooked in. Ingestion of lead paint and batteries is also a route of exposure for livestock, which can subsequently affect humans. Milk produced by contaminated cattle can be diluted to a lower lead concentration and sold for consumption.

In Bangladesh, lead compounds have been added to turmeric to make it more yellow. This is believed to have started in the 1980s and continues as of 2019. It is believed to be one of the main sources of high lead levels in the country. In Hong Kong the maximum allowed lead level in food is 6 parts per million in solids and 1 part per million in liquids.

Lead-containing dust can settle on drying cocoa beans when they are set outside near polluting industrial plants. In December 2022, Consumer Reports tested 28 dark chocolate brands and found that 23 of them contained potentially harmful levels of lead, cadmium or both. They have urged the chocolate makers to reduce the level of lead which could be harmful, especially to a developing fetus.

In March 2024, the US Food and Drug Administration recommended a voluntary recall on 6 brands of cinnamon due to contamination with lead, after 500 reports of child lead poisoning. The FDA determined that cinnamon was adulterated with lead chromate.

==== Lead in plastic toys ====
According to the United States Center for Disease Control, the use of lead in plastics has not been banned as of 2024. Lead softens the plastic and makes it more flexible so that it can go back to its original shape. Habitual chewing on colored plastic insulation from stripped electrical wires was found to cause elevated lead levels in a 46-year-old man. Lead may be used in plastic toys to stabilize molecules from heat. Lead dust can be formed when plastic is exposed to sunlight, air, and detergents that break down the chemical bond between the lead and plastics.

=== Treatment ===
Treatment for lead poisoning normally involves the administration of dimercaprol and succimer. Acute cases may require the use of disodium calcium edetate, the calcium chelate, and the disodium salt of ethylenediaminetetraacetic acid (EDTA). It has a greater affinity for lead than calcium, with the result that lead chelate is formed by exchange and excreted in the urine, leaving behind harmless calcium.

=== Disease burden ===
The global disease burden caused by lead is enormous, with various estimates attributing millions of annual deaths to lead exposure. The Global Burden of Disease Study attributed 850,000 deaths in 2019 to hypertension caused by lead exposure, and a 2023 study in Lancet Planetary Health estimated that nearly 5.5 million annual deaths from cardiovascular disease (CVD) were caused by lead. A 2022 study in the Journal of the American College of Cardiology estimated that lead exposure caused 1.57 million death worldwide in 2021, through "hypertension, stroke, coronary artery disease, peripheral artery disease, and other CVDs."

Lead exposure is the primary environmental cause for cognitive impairment; even slightly elevated lead levels around the age of 24 months are associated with intellectual and academic performance deficits at age 10 years. Half of the U.S. population is estimated to have had a blood lead level over 5 µg/dL in early childhood, which caused an estimated cumulative loss of 824 million IQ points as of 2015.

== Environmental effects ==
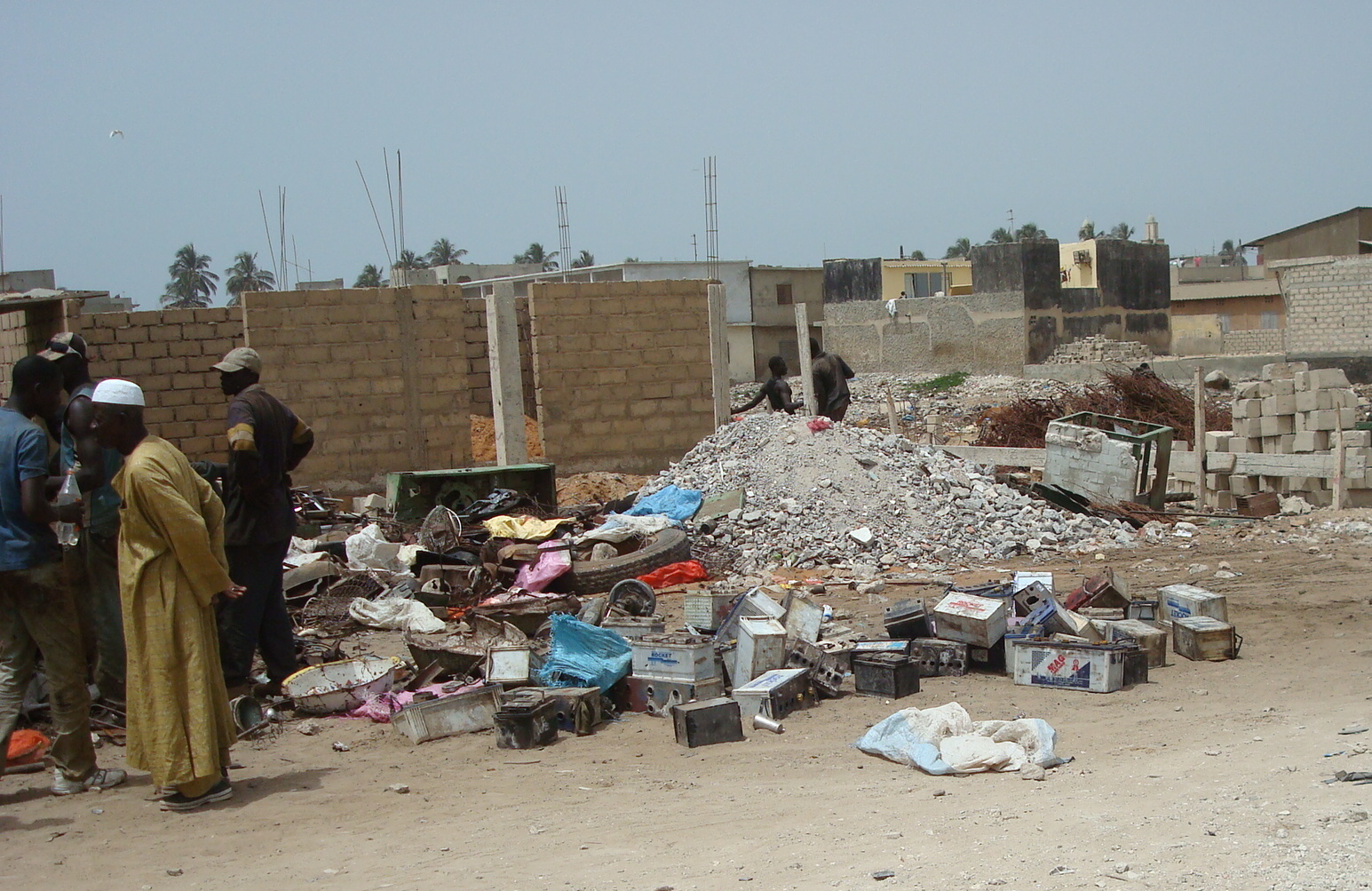
Battery collection site in Dakar, Senegal, where at least 18 children died of lead poisoning in 2008

The extraction, production, use, and disposal of lead and its products have caused significant contamination of the Earth's soils and waters. Atmospheric emissions of lead were at their peak during the Industrial Revolution, and the leaded gasoline period in the second half of the twentieth century.

Lead releases originate from natural sources (i.e., concentration of the naturally occurring lead), industrial production, incineration and recycling, and mobilization of previously buried lead. In particular, as lead has been phased out from other uses, in the Global South, lead recycling operations designed to extract cheap lead used for global manufacturing have become a well documented source of exposure. Elevated concentrations of lead persist in soils and sediments in post-industrial and urban areas; industrial emissions, including those arising from coal burning, continue in many parts of the world, particularly in the developing countries.

Lead can accumulate in soils, especially those with a high organic content, where it remains for hundreds to thousands of years. Environmental lead can compete with other metals found in and on plant surfaces potentially inhibiting photosynthesis and at high enough concentrations, negatively affecting plant growth and survival. Contamination of soils and plants can allow lead to ascend the food chain affecting microorganisms and animals. In animals, lead exhibits toxicity in many organs, damaging the nervous, renal, reproductive, hematopoietic, and cardiovascular systems after ingestion, inhalation, or skin absorption. Fish uptake lead from both water and sediment; bioaccumulation in the food chain poses a hazard to fish, birds, and sea mammals.

Anthropogenic lead includes lead from shot and sinkers. These are among the most potent sources of lead contamination along with lead production sites. In 2017, lead shot, bullets, and sinkers were banned for hunting and fishing on land managed by the USFWS, but the ban was only effective for a month. A similar ban is being considered in the European Union.

Analytical methods for the determination of lead in the environment include spectrophotometry, X-ray fluorescence, atomic spectroscopy, and electrochemical methods. A specific ion-selective electrode has been developed based on the ionophore S,S'-methylenebis(N,N-diisobutyldithiocarbamate). An important biomarker assay for lead poisoning is δ-aminolevulinic acid levels in plasma, serum, and urine.

== Restriction and remediation ==
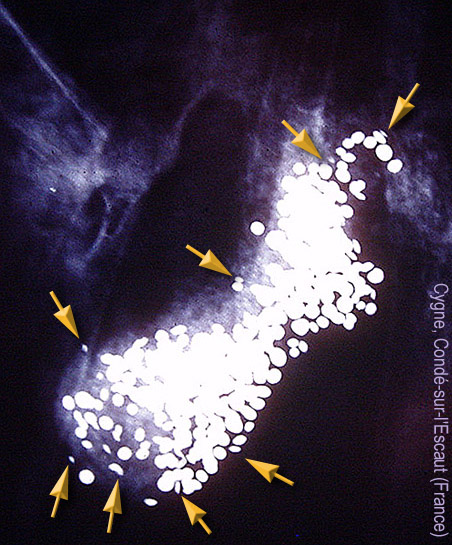
Radiography of a swan found dead in Condé-sur-l'Escaut (northern France), highlighting lead shot. There are hundreds of lead pellets (a dozen is enough to kill an adult swan within a few days). Such bodies are sources of environmental contamination by lead.

By the mid-1980s, there was significant decline in the use of lead in industry. In the United States, environmental regulations reduced or eliminated the use of lead in non-battery products, including gasoline, paints, solders, and water systems. Particulate control devices were installed in coal-fired power plants to capture lead emissions. In 1992, U.S. Congress required the Environmental Protection Agency to reduce the blood lead levels of the country's children. Lead use was further curtailed by the European Union's 2003 Restriction of Hazardous Substances Directive. A large drop in lead deposition occurred in the Netherlands after the 1993 national ban on use of lead shot for hunting and sport shooting: from 230 tonnes in 1990 to 47.5 tonnes in 1995. The usage of lead in Avgas 100LL for general aviation is allowed in the EU as of 2022.

In the United States, the permissible exposure limit for lead in the workplace, comprising metallic lead, inorganic lead compounds, and lead soaps, was set at 50 μg/m^{3} over an 8-hour workday, and the blood lead level limit at 5 μg per 100 g of blood in 2012. Lead may still be found in harmful quantities in stoneware, vinyl (such as that used for tubing and the insulation of electrical cords), and Chinese brass. (Note: An alloy of brass (copper and zinc) with lead, iron, tin, and sometimes antimony.) Old houses may still contain lead paint. White lead paint has been withdrawn from sale in industrialized countries, but specialized uses of other pigments such as yellow lead chromate remain, especially in road pavement marking paint. Stripping old paint by sanding produces dust which can be inhaled. Lead abatement programs have been mandated by some authorities in properties where young children live. The usage of lead in Avgas 100LL for general aviation is generally allowed in United States as of 2023.

Lead waste, depending on the jurisdiction and the nature of the waste, may be treated as household waste (to facilitate lead abatement activities), or potentially hazardous waste requiring specialized treatment or storage. Lead is released into the environment in shooting places and a number of lead management practices have been developed to counter the lead contamination. Lead migration can be enhanced in acidic soils; to counter that, it is advised soils be treated with lime to neutralize the soils and prevent leaching of lead.

Research has been conducted on how to remove lead from biosystems by biological means: Fish bones are being researched for their ability to bioremediate lead in contaminated soil. The fungus Aspergillus versicolor is effective at absorbing lead ions from industrial waste before being released to water bodies. Several bacteria have been researched for their ability to remove lead from the environment, including the sulfate-reducing bacteria Desulfovibrio and Desulfotomaculum, both of which are highly effective in aqueous solutions. Millet grass Urochloa ramosa has the ability to accumulate significant amounts of metals such as lead and zinc in its shoot and root tissues making it an important plant for remediation of contaminated soils.

== See also ==
- Derek Bryce-Smith – one of the earliest campaigners against lead in petrol in the UK
- Thomas Midgley Jr. – discovered that the addition of tetraethyllead to gasoline prevented "knocking" in internal combustion engines
- Clair Cameron Patterson – instrumental in the banning of tetraethyllead in gasoline in the US and lead solder in food cans.
- Robert A. Kehoe – foremost medical advocate for the use of tetraethyllead as an additive in gasoline.

== Bibliography ==
- Acton, Q. A., ed. (2013). Issues in Global Environment—Pollution and Waste Management: 2012 Edition. ScholarlyEditions. ISBN 978-1-4816-4665-9.
- Agency for Toxic Substances and Disease Registry (20 August 2007). "Information for the Community: Lead Toxicity" (MP4 webcast, 82 MB). Archived from the original on 16 October 2022.
- Agency for Toxic Substances and Disease Registry (2017). "Lead Toxicity. What Are U.S. Standards for Lead Levels?". Archived from the original on 12 March 2020.
- Alsfasser, R. (2007). Moderne anorganische Chemie [Modern inorganic chemistry] (in German). Walter de Gruyter. ISBN 978-3-11-019060-1.
- American Geophysical Union (2017). "Human Activity Has Polluted European Air for 2000 Years". Eos Science News. Archived from the original on 27 June 2017.
- Amstock, J. S. (1997). Handbook of Glass in Construction. McGraw-Hill Professional. ISBN 978-0-07-001619-4.
- Anderson, J. (1869). "Malleability and ductility of metals". Scientific American. 21 (22): 341–43. doi:10.1038/scientificamerican11271869-341.
- Ashikari, M. (2003). "The memory of the women's white faces: Japaneseness and the ideal image of women". Japan Forum. 15 (1): 55–79. doi:10.1080/0955580032000077739. S2CID 144510689.
- Assi, M. A.; Hezmee, M. N. M.; Haron, A. W.; et al. (2016). "The detrimental effects of lead on human and animal health". Veterinary World. 9 (6): 660–671. doi:10.14202/vetworld.2016.660-671. ISSN 0972-8988. PMC 4937060. PMID 27397992.
- Auer, Charles M.; Kover, Frank D.; Aidala, James V.; Greenwood, Mark (1 March 2016). Toxic Substances: A Half Century of Progress (PDF) (Report). EPA Alumni Association.
- Audsley, G. A. (1965). The Art of Organ Building. Vol. 2. Courier. ISBN 978-0-486-21315-6.
- Baird, C.; Cann, N. (2012). Environmental Chemistry (5th ed.). W. H. Freeman and Company. ISBN 978-1-4292-7704-4.
- Becker, M.; Förster, C.; Franzen, C.; et al. (2008). "Persistent radicals of trivalent tin and lead". Inorganic Chemistry. 47 (21): 9965–78. doi:10.1021/ic801198p. PMID 18823115.
- Beeman, J. W.; Bellini, F.; Cardani, L.; et al. (2013). "New experimental limits on the α decays of lead isotopes". European Physical Journal A. 49 (50): 50. arXiv:1212.2422. Bibcode:2013EPJA...49...50B. doi:10.1140/epja/i2013-13050-7. S2CID 119280082.
- Beiner, G. G.; Lavi, M.; Seri, H.; et al. (2015). "Oddy Tests: Adding the Analytical Dimension". Collection Forum. 29 (1–2): 22–36. doi:10.14351/0831-4985-29.1.22. ISSN 0831-4985.
- Bharara, M. S.; Atwood, D. A. (2006). "Lead: Inorganic ChemistryBased in part on the article Lead: Inorganic Chemistry by Philip G. Harrison which appeared in the Encyclopedia of Inorganic Chemistry, First Edition". Lead: Inorganic Chemistry. doi:10.1002/0470862106.ia118. ISBN 978-0470860786.
- Bisel, S. C.; Bisel, J. F. (2002). "Health and nutrition at Herculaneum". In Jashemski, W. F.; Meyer, F. G. (eds.). The Natural History of Pompeii. Cambridge University Press. pp. 451–75. ISBN 978-0-521-80054-9.
- Bisson, M. S.; Vogel, J. O. (2000). Ancient African Metallurgy: The Sociocultural Context. Rowman & Littlefield. ISBN 978-0-7425-0261-1.
- Blakemore, J. S. (1985). Solid State Physics. Cambridge University Press. ISBN 978-0-521-31391-9.
- Bouchard, M. F.; Bellinger, D. C.; Weuve, J.; et al. (2009). "Blood Lead Levels and Major Depressive Disorder, Panic Disorder, and Generalized Anxiety Disorder in US Young Adults". Archives of General Psychiatry. 66 (12): 1313–9. doi:10.1001/archgenpsychiatry.2009.164. ISSN 0003-990X. PMC 2917196. PMID 19996036.
- Bremner, H. A. (2002). Safety and Quality Issues in Fish Processing. Elsevier. ISBN 978-1-85573-678-8.
- Brenner, G. A. (2003). Webster's New World American Idioms Handbook. John Wiley & Sons. ISBN 978-0-7645-2477-6.
- Brescia, F. (2012). Fundamentals of Chemistry: A Modern Introduction. Elsevier. ISBN 978-0-323-14231-1.
- Bretherick, L. (2016). Bretherick's Handbook of Reactive Chemical Hazards. Elsevier. ISBN 978-1-4831-6250-8.
- Bunker, B. C.; Casey, W. H. (2016). The Aqueous Chemistry of Oxides. Oxford University Press. ISBN 978-0-19-938425-9.
- Burbidge, E. M.; Burbidge, G. R.; Fowler, W. A.; et al. (1957). "Synthesis of the Elements in Stars". Reviews of Modern Physics. 29 (4): 547–654. Bibcode:1957RvMP...29..547B. doi:10.1103/RevModPhys.29.547.
- Burleson, M. (2001). The Ceramic Glaze Handbook: Materials, Techniques, Formulas. Sterling. ISBN 9781579904395.
- California Department of Fish and Wildlife. "Nonlead Ammunition in California". www.wildlife.ca.gov.
- de Callataÿ, F. (2005). "The Graeco-Roman economy in the super long-run: Lead, copper, and shipwrecks". Journal of Roman Archaeology. 18: 361–72. doi:10.1017/S104775940000742X. S2CID 232346123.
- Cama, T. (2017). "Interior secretary repeals ban on lead bullets". The Hill.
- Cangelosi, V. M.; Pecoraro, V. L. (2015). "Lead". In Roduner, E. (ed.). Nanoscopic Materials: Size-Dependent Phenomena and Growth Principles. Royal Society of Chemistry. pp. 843–875. ISBN 978-1-78262-494-3.
- Casciani, D. (2014). "Did removing lead from petrol spark a decline in crime?". BBC News.
- Calvo Rebollar, Miguel (2019). Construyendo la Tabla Periódica. Zaragoza, Spain: Prames. ISBN 978-84-8321-908-9.
- Ceccarelli, P. (2013). Ancient Greek Letter Writing: A Cultural History (600 BC- 150 BC). OUP Oxford. ISBN 978-0-19-967559-3.
- Centers for Disease Control and Prevention (1997). "Update: blood lead levels--United States, 1991-1994". Morbidity and Mortality Weekly Report. 46 (7): 141–146. ISSN 0149-2195. PMID 9072671.
- Centers for Disease Control and Prevention (2015). "Radiation and Your Health".
- Chapurukha Kusimba (20 June 2017). "Making Cents of Currency's Ancient Rise". Smithsonian Magazine.
- Christensen, N. E. (2002). "Relativistic Solid State Theory". In Schwerdtfeger, P. (ed.). Relativistic Electronic Structure Theory — Fundamentals. Theoretical and Computational Chemistry. Vol. 11. Elsevier. pp. 867–68. doi:10.1016/s1380-7323(02)80041-3. ISBN 978-0-08-054046-7.
- Claudio, Elizabeth S.; Godwin, Hilary Arnold; Magyar, John S. (2002). "Fundamental Coordination Chemistry, Environmental Chemistry, and Biochemistry of Lead(II)". Progress in Inorganic Chemistry, Volume 51. John Wiley & Sons, Inc. pp. 1–144. doi:10.1002/0471267287.ch1. ISBN 978-0-471-26534-4.
- Cohen, A. R.; Trotzky, M. S.; Pincus, D. (1981). "Reassessment of the Microcytic Anemia of Lead Poisoning". Pediatrics. 67 (6): 904–906. doi:10.1542/peds.67.6.904. PMID 7232054.
- Committee on Evaluation of EPA Guidelines for Exposure to Naturally Occurring Radioactive Materials; Commission on Life Sciences; Division on Earth and Life Studies; National Research Council (1999). Evaluation of Guidelines for Exposures to Technologically Enhanced Naturally Occurring Radioactive Materials. National Academies Press. pp. 26, 30–32. ISBN 978-0-309-58070-0.
- Concordia University (2016). Lead acid batteries (PDF) (Report).
- Considine, D. M.; Considine, G. D. (2013). Van Nostrand's Scientific Encyclopedia. Springer Science & Business Media. ISBN 978-1-4757-6918-0.
- Copper Development Association. "Leaded Coppers". copper.org.
- Cotnoir, B. (2006). The Weiser Concise Guide to Alchemy. Weiser Books. ISBN 978-1-57863-379-1.
- Cox, P. A. (1997). The Elements: Their Origin, Abundance and Distribution. Oxford University Press. ISBN 978-0-19-855298-7.
- Crow, J. M. (2007). "Why use lead in paint?". Chemistry World. Royal Society of Chemistry.
- Dart, R. C.; Hurlbut, K. M.; Boyer-Hassen, L. V. (2004). "Lead". In Dart, R. C. (ed.). Medical Toxicology (3rd ed.). Lippincott Williams & Wilkins. p. 1426. ISBN 978-0-7817-2845-4.
- Davidson, A.; Ryman, J.; Sutherland, C. A.; et al. (2014). "Lead". Ullmann's Encyclopedia of Industrial Chemistry. doi:10.1002/14356007.a15_193.pub3. ISBN 978-3-527-30673-2.
- de Marcillac, Pierre; Coron, Noël; Dambier, Gérard; et al. (2003). "Experimental detection of α-particles from the radioactive decay of natural bismuth". Nature. 422 (6934): 876–78. Bibcode:2003Natur.422..876D. doi:10.1038/nature01541. PMID 12712201. S2CID 4415582.
- Delile, H.; Blichert-Toft, J.; Goiran, J.-P.; et al. (2014). "Lead in ancient Rome's city waters". Proceedings of the National Academy of Sciences. 111 (18): 6594–99. Bibcode:2014PNAS..111.6594D. doi:10.1073/pnas.1400097111. ISSN 0027-8424. PMC 4020092. PMID 24753588.
- Deltares; Netherlands Organisation for Applied Scientific Research (2016). Lood en zinkemissies door jacht [Lead and zinc emissions from hunting] (PDF) (Report) (in Dutch). Archived from the original (PDF) on 12 April 2019.
- Dieter, R. K.; Watson, R. T. (2009). "Transmetalation reactions producing organocopper compounds". In Rappoport, Z.; Marek, I. (eds.). The Chemistry of Organocopper Compounds. Vol. 1. John Wiley & Sons. pp. 443–526. ISBN 978-0-470-77296-6.
- Donnelly, J. (2014). Deep Blue. Hachette Children's Group. ISBN 978-1-4449-2119-9.
- Downs, A. J.; Adams, C. J. (2017). The Chemistry of Chlorine, Bromine, Iodine and Astatine: Pergamon Texts in Inorganic Chemistry. Elsevier. ISBN 978-1-4831-5832-7.
- Duda, M. B. (1996). Traditional Chinese Toggles: Counterweights and Charms. Editions Didier Millet. ISBN 978-981-4260-61-9.
- Ede, A.; Cormack, L. B. (2016). A History of Science in Society, Volume I: From the Ancient Greeks to the Scientific Revolution, Third Edition. University of Toronto Press. ISBN 978-1-4426-3503-6.
- Emsley, J. (2011). Nature's Building Blocks: An A-Z Guide to the Elements. Oxford University Press. ISBN 978-0-19-960563-7.
- "Encyclopedia Judaica: Ossuaries and Sarcophagi". www.jewishvirtuallibrary.org.
- Eschnauer, H. R.; Stoeppler, M. (1992). "Wine—An enological specimen bank". In Stoeppler, M. (ed.). Hazardous Materials in the Environment. Elsevier Science. pp. 49–72 (58). doi:10.1016/s0167-9244(08)70103-3. ISBN 978-0-444-89078-8.
- Evans, J. W. (1908). "V.— The meanings and synonyms of plumbago". Transactions of the Philological Society. 26 (2): 133–79. doi:10.1111/j.1467-968X.1908.tb00513.x.
- Finger, S. (2006). Doctor Franklin's Medicine. University of Pennsylvania Press. ISBN 978-0-8122-3913-3.
- Fiorini, E. (2010). "2.000 years-old Roman Lead for physics" (PDF). ASPERA: 7–8. Archived from the original (PDF) on 26 April 2018.
- Frankenburg, F. R. (2014). Brain-Robbers: How Alcohol, Cocaine, Nicotine, and Opiates Have Changed Human History. ABC-CLIO. ISBN 978-1-4408-2932-1.
- Frebel, A. (2015). Searching for the Oldest Stars: Ancient Relics from the Early Universe. Princeton University. ISBN 978-0-691-16506-6.
- Freeman, K. S. (2012). "Remediating soil lead with fishbones". Environmental Health Perspectives. 120 (1): a20–a21. Bibcode:2012EnvHP.120.a20aF. doi:10.1289/ehp.120-a20a. PMC 3261960. PMID 22214821.
- Funke, K. (2013). "Solid State Ionics: from Michael Faraday to green energy—the European dimension". Science and Technology of Advanced Materials. 14 (4): 1–50. Bibcode:2013STAdM..14d3502F. doi:10.1088/1468-6996/14/4/043502. PMC 5090311. PMID 27877585.
- Gale, W. F.; Totemeier, T. C. (2003). Smithells Metals Reference Book. Butterworth-Heinemann. ISBN 978-0-08-048096-1.
- Gilfillan, S. C. (1965). "Lead poisoning and the fall of Rome". Journal of Occupational Medicine. 7 (2): 53–60. ISSN 0096-1736. PMID 14261844.
- Gill, T.; Libraries Board of South Australia (1974). The history and topography of Glen Osmond, with map and illustrations. Libraries Board of South Australia. ISBN 9780724300358.
- Graedel, T. E.; et al. (2010). Metal stocks in Society – Scientific Synthesis (PDF) (Report). International Resource Panel. p. 17. ISBN 978-92-807-3082-1. Archived from the original (PDF) on 26 April 2018.
- Grandjean, P. (1978). "Widening perspectives of lead toxicity". Environmental Research. 17 (2): 303–21. Bibcode:1978ER.....17..303G. doi:10.1016/0013-9351(78)90033-6. PMID 400972.
- Greenwood, N. N.; Earnshaw, A. (1998). Chemistry of the Elements (2nd ed.). Butterworth-Heinemann. ISBN 978-0-7506-3365-9.
- Grout, J. (2017). "Lead poisoning and Rome". Encyclopaedia Romana.
- Guberman, D. E. (2016). "Lead" (PDF). 2014 Minerals Yearbook (Report). United States Geological Survey.
- Gulbinska, M. K. (2014). Lithium-ion Battery Materials and Engineering: Current Topics and Problems from the Manufacturing Perspective. Springer. p. 96. ISBN 978-1-4471-6548-4.
- Guruswamy, S. (2000). Engineering properties and applications of lead alloys. Marcel Dekker. ISBN 978-0-8247-8247-4.
- Hadlington, T. J. (2017). On the Catalytic Efficacy of Low-Oxidation State Group 14 Complexes. Springer. ISBN 978-3-319-51807-7.
- Harbison, R. D.; Bourgeois, M. M.; Johnson, G. T. (2015). Hamilton and Hardy's Industrial Toxicology. John Wiley & Sons. ISBN 978-0-470-92973-5.
- Hauser, Peter C. (2017). "Analytical Methods for the Determination of Lead in the Environment". In Sigel, Astrid; Sigel, Helmut; Sigel, Roland K.O. (eds.). Lead: Its Effects on Environment and Health. Vol. 17. pp. 49–60. doi:10.1515/9783110434330-003. ISBN 978-3-11-043433-0. PMID 28731296.
- Hernberg, S. (2000). "Lead Poisoning in a Historical Perspective" (PDF). American Journal of Industrial Medicine. 38 (3): 244–54. doi:10.1002/1097-0274(200009)38:3<244::AID-AJIM3>3.0.CO;2-F. PMID 10940962. Archived from the original (PDF) on 21 September 2017.
- "A History of Cosmetics from Ancient Times". Cosmetics Info. Archived from the original on 14 July 2016.
- Hodge, T. A. (1981). "Vitruvius, lead pipes and lead poisoning". American Journal of Archaeology. 85 (4): 486–91. doi:10.2307/504874. JSTOR 504874. S2CID 193094209.
- Hong, S.; Candelone, J.-P.; Patterson, C. C.; et al. (1994). "Greenland ice evidence of hemispheric lead pollution two millennia ago by Greek and Roman civilizations" (PDF). Science. 265 (5180): 1841–43. Bibcode:1994Sci...265.1841H. doi:10.1126/science.265.5180.1841. PMID 17797222. S2CID 45080402. Archived from the original (PDF) on 29 April 2019.
- Hunt, A. (2014). Dictionary of Chemistry. Routledge. ISBN 978-1-135-94178-9.
- IAEA - Nuclear Data Section (2017). "Livechart - Table of Nuclides - Nuclear structure and decay data". www-nds.iaea.org. International Atomic Energy Agency.
- Insight Explorer; IPEN (2016). New Study Finds Lead Levels in a Majority of Paints Exceed Chinese Regulation and Should Not be on Store Shelves (PDF) (Report).
- Ismawati, Yuyun; Primanti, Andita; Brosché, Sara; Clark, Scott; Weinberg, Jack; Denney, Valerie (2013). Timbal dalam Cat Enamel Rumah Tangga di Indonesia (PDF) (Report) (in Indonesian). BaliFokus & IPEN.
- Jensen, C. F. (2013). Online Location of Faults on AC Cables in Underground Transmission. Springer. ISBN 978-3-319-05397-4.
- Jones, P. A. (2014). Jedburgh Justice and Kentish Fire: The Origins of English in Ten Phrases and Expressions. Constable. ISBN 978-1-47211-389-4.
- Kaupp, M. (2014). "Chemical bonding of main-group elements" (PDF). In Frenking, G.; Shaik, S. (eds.). The Chemical Bond: Chemical Bonding Across the Periodic Table. John Wiley & Sons. pp. 1–24. doi:10.1002/9783527664658.ch1. ISBN 9783527664658. S2CID 17979350.
- Kellett, C. (2012). Poison and Poisoning: A Compendium of Cases, Catastrophes and Crimes. Accent Press. ISBN 978-1-909335-05-9. Archived from the original on 9 June 2019.
- King, R. B. (1995). Inorganic Chemistry of Main Group Elements. VCH Publishers. ISBN 978-1-56081-679-9.
- Konu, J.; Chivers, T. (2011). "Stable Radicals of the Heavy p-Block Elements". In Hicks, R. G. (ed.). Stable Radicals: Fundamentals and Applied Aspects of Odd-Electron Compounds. John Wiley & Sons. doi:10.1002/9780470666975.ch10. ISBN 978-0-470-77083-2.
- Kosnett, M. J. (2006). "Lead". In Olson, K. R. (ed.). Poisoning and Drug Overdose (5th ed.). McGraw-Hill Professional. p. 238. ISBN 978-0-07-144333-3.
- Krestovnikoff, M.; Halls, M. (2006). Scuba Diving. Dorling Kindersley. ISBN 978-0-7566-4063-7.
- Kroonen, G. (2013). Etymological Dictionary of Proto-Germanic. Leiden Indo-European Etymological Dictionary Series. Vol. 11. Brill. ISBN 978-90-04-18340-7.
- Langmuir, C. H.; Broecker, W. S. (2012). How to Build a Habitable Planet: The Story of Earth from the Big Bang to Humankind. Princeton University Press. ISBN 978-0-691-14006-3.
- Lauwerys, R. R.; Hoet, P. (2001). Industrial Chemical Exposure: Guidelines for Biological Monitoring, Third Edition. CRC Press. ISBN 978-1-4822-9383-8.
- Layton, M. (2017). "Lead faces threat of new Euro ban". ShootingUK. shootinguk.co.uk. Archived from the original on 9 June 2019.
- "Lead sling bullet; almond shape; a winged thunderbolt on one side and on the other, in high relief, the inscription DEXAI "Catch!"". The British Museum. Archived from the original on 14 February 2012.
- "Lead garden ornaments". H. Crowther Ltd. 2016.
- "Lead in Waste Disposal". United States Environmental Protection Agency. 2016.
- "Lead mining". The Northern Echo.
- Levin, H. L. (2009). The Earth Through Time. John Wiley & Sons. ISBN 978-0-470-38774-0.
- Levin, R.; Brown, M. J.; Kashtock, M. E.; et al. (2008). "Lead exposures in U.S. children, 2008: Implications for prevention". Environmental Health Perspectives. 116 (10): 1285–93. Bibcode:2008EnvHP.116.1285L. doi:10.1289/ehp.11241. PMC 2569084. PMID 18941567.
- Lewis, J. (1985). "Lead Poisoning: A Historical Perspective". EPA Journal. 11 (4): 15–18.
- Lide, D. R., ed. (2005). CRC Handbook of Chemistry and Physics (85th ed.). CRC Press. ISBN 978-0-8493-0484-2.
- Liu, J.; Liu, X.; Pak, V.; et al. (2015). "Early blood lead levels and sleep disturbance in preadolescence". Sleep. 38 (12): 1869–74. doi:10.5665/sleep.5230. PMC 4667382. PMID 26194570.
- Lochner, J. C.; Rohrbach, G.; Cochrane, K. (2005). "What is Your Cosmic Connection to the Elements?" (PDF). Goddard Space Flight Center. Archived from the original (PDF) on 29 December 2016.
- Lodders, K. (2003). "Solar System abundances and condensation temperatures of the elements" (PDF). The Astrophysical Journal. 591 (2): 1220–47. Bibcode:2003ApJ...591.1220L. doi:10.1086/375492. ISSN 0004-637X. S2CID 42498829.
- Luckey, T. D.; Venugopal, B. (1979). Physiologic and Chemical Basis for Metal Toxicity. Plenum Press. ISBN 978-1-4684-2952-7.
- Macintyre, J. E. (1992). Dictionary of Inorganic Compounds. CRC Press. ISBN 978-0-412-30120-9.
- Marino, P. E.; Landrigan, P. J.; Graef, J.; et al. (1990). "A case report of lead paint poisoning during renovation of a Victorian farmhouse". American Journal of Public Health. 80 (10): 1183–85. doi:10.2105/AJPH.80.10.1183. PMC 1404824. PMID 2119148.
- Markowitz, G.; Rosner, D. (2000). ""Cater to the children": the role of the lead industry in a public health tragedy, 1900–55". American Journal of Public Health. 90 (1): 36–46. doi:10.2105/ajph.90.1.36. PMC 1446124. PMID 10630135.
- Masters, S. B.; Trevor, A. J.; Katzung, B. G. (2008). Katzung & Trevor's Pharmacology: Examination & Board Review (8th ed.). McGraw-Hill Medical. ISBN 978-0-07-148869-3.
- McCoy, S. (2017). "The End of Lead? Federal Gov't Order Bans Sinkers, Ammo". GearJunkie. Archived from the original on 8 March 2020.
- Meija, Juris; et al. (2016). "Atomic weights of the elements 2013 (IUPAC Technical Report)". Pure and Applied Chemistry. 88 (3): 265–291. doi:10.1515/pac-2015-0305.
- Merriam-Webster. "Definition of LEAD". www.merriam-webster.com.
- Moore, M. R. (1977). "Lead in drinking water in soft water areas—health hazards". Science of the Total Environment. 7 (2): 109–15. Bibcode:1977ScTEn...7..109M. doi:10.1016/0048-9697(77)90002-X. PMID 841299.
- More, Alexander F.; Spaulding, Nicole E.; Bohleber, Pascal; et al. (2017). "Next-generation ice core technology reveals true minimum natural levels of lead (Pb) in the atmosphere: Insights from the Black Death". GeoHealth. 1 (4): 211–219. Bibcode:2017GHeal...1..211M. doi:10.1002/2017GH000064. PMC 7007106. PMID 32158988.
- Mosseri, S.; Henglein, A.; Janata, E. (1990). "Trivalent lead as an intermediate in the oxidation of lead(II) and the reduction of lead(IV) species". Journal of Physical Chemistry. 94 (6): 2722–26. Bibcode:1990JPhCh..94.2722M. doi:10.1021/j100369a089.
- Mycyk, M.; Hryhorczuk, D.; Amitai, Y.; et al. (2005). "Lead". In Erickson, T. B.; Ahrens, W. R.; Aks, S. (eds.). Pediatric Toxicology: Diagnosis and Management of the Poisoned Child. McGraw-Hill Professional. ISBN 978-0-07-141736-5.
- Nakashima, T.; Hayashi, H.; Tashiro, H.; et al. (1998). "Gender and hierarchical differences in lead-contaminated Japanese bone from the Edo period". Journal of Occupational Health. 40 (1): 55–60. doi:10.1539/joh.40.55. S2CID 71451911.
- National Council on Radiation Protection and Measurements (2004). Structural Shielding Design for Medical X-ray Imaging Facilities. ISBN 978-0-929600-83-3.
- National Institute for Occupational Safety and Health. "NIOSH Pocket Guide to Chemical Hazards — Lead". www.cdc.gov.
- Navas-Acien, A. (2007). "Lead Exposure and Cardiovascular Disease—A Systematic Review". Environmental Health Perspectives. 115 (3): 472–482. Bibcode:2007EnvHP.115..472N. doi:10.1289/ehp.9785. PMC 1849948. PMID 17431501.
- Neiburger, E.J. (April 2018). "X-Rays, Archaeology and the Chopsticks of Death". Central States Archaeological Journal. 65 (2): 70–74. JSTOR 44715698.
- Nikolayev, S., ed. (2012). "*lAudh-". Indo-European Etymology.
- Norman, N. C. (1996). Periodicity and the s- and p-Block Elements. Oxford University Press. ISBN 978-0-19-855961-0.
- Nriagu, J. O. (1983). "Saturnine gout among Roman aristocrats — Did lead poisoning contribute to the fall of the Empire?". The New England Journal of Medicine. 308 (11): 660–63. doi:10.1056/NEJM198303173081123. PMID 6338384.
- Nriagu, J. O.; Kim, M-J. (2000). "Emissions of lead and zinc from candles with metal-core wicks". Science of the Total Environment. 250 (1–3): 37–41. Bibcode:2000ScTEn.250...37N. doi:10.1016/S0048-9697(00)00359-4. PMID 10811249.
- Occupational Safety and Health Administration. "Substance data sheet for occupational exposure to lead". www.osha.gov. Archived from the original on 16 March 2018.
- Olinsky-Paul, T. (2013). "East Penn and Ecoult battery installation case study webinar" (PDF). Clean Energy States Alliance.
- Palmieri, R., ed. (2006). The Organ. Psychology Press. ISBN 978-0-415-94174-7.
- "surma". Oxford English Dictionary (2nd ed.). Oxford University Press. 2009.
- Park, J. H.; Bolan, N.; Meghara, M.; et al. (2011). "Bacterial-assisted immobilization of lead in soils: Implications for remediation" (PDF). Pedologist: 162–74. Archived from the original (PDF) on 26 November 2015.
- Parker, R. B. (2005). The New Cold-Molded Boatbuilding: From Lofting to Launching. WoodenBoat Books. ISBN 978-0-937822-89-0.
- Parthé, E. (1964). Crystal Chemistry of Tetrahedral Structures. CRC Press. ISBN 978-0-677-00700-7.
- Pauling, L. (1947). General Chemistry. W. H. Freeman and Company. ISBN 978-0-486-65622-9.
- Peneva, S. K.; Djuneva, K. D.; Tsukeva, E. A. (1981). "RHEED study of the initial stages of crystallization and oxidation of lead and tin". Journal of Crystal Growth. 53 (2): 382–396. Bibcode:1981JCrGr..53..382P. doi:10.1016/0022-0248(81)90088-9. ISSN 0022-0248.
- Petzel, S.; Juuti, M.; Sugimoto, Yu. (2004). "Environmental Stewardship with Regional Perspectives and Drivers of the Lead-free Issue". In Puttlitz, K. J.; Stalter, K. A. (eds.). Handbook of Lead-Free Solder Technology for Microelectronic Assemblies. CRC Press. ISBN 978-0-8247-5249-1.
- Polyanskiy, N. G. (1986). Fillipova, N. A (ed.). Аналитическая химия элементов: Свинец [Analytical Chemistry of the Elements: Lead] (in Russian). Nauka.
- Prasad, P. J. (2010). Conceptual Pharmacology. Universities Press. ISBN 978-81-7371-679-9.
- "Primary Lead Refining Technical Notes". LDA International. Archived from the original on 22 March 2007.
- Progressive Dynamics, Inc. "How Lead Acid Batteries Work: Battery Basics". progressivedyn.com. Archived from the original on 19 November 2018.
- Putnam, B. (2003). The Sculptor's Way: A Guide to Modelling and Sculpture. Dover Publications. ISBN 978-0-486-42313-5.
- Pyykkö, P. (1988). "Relativistic effects in structural chemistry". Chemical Reviews. 88 (3): 563–94. doi:10.1021/cr00085a006.
- Rabinowitz, M. B. (1995). "Imputing lead sources from blood lead isotope ratios". In Beard, M. E.; Allen Iske, S. D. (eds.). Lead in Paint, Soil, and Dust: Health Risks, Exposure Studies, Control Measures, Measurement Methods, and Quality Assurance. ASTM. pp. 63–75. doi:10.1520/stp12967s. ISBN 978-0-8031-1884-3.
- "Radioactive Decay Series" (PDF). Nuclear Systematics. MIT OpenCourseWare. 2012.
- Ramage, C. K., ed. (1980). Lyman Cast Bullet Handbook (3rd ed.). Lyman Products Corporation.
- Randerson, J. (2002). "Candle pollution". New Scientist (2348).
- Reddy, A.; Braun, C. L. (2010). "Lead and the Romans". Journal of Chemical Education. 87 (10): 1052–55. Bibcode:2010JChEd..87.1052R. doi:10.1021/ed100631y.
- Renfrew, Daniel (2019). Life without lead: contamination, crisis, and hope in Uruguay. Oakland, California: University of California Press. ISBN 978-0-520-96824-0. OCLC 1102765674.
- Retief, F.; Cilliers, L. P. (2006). "Lead poisoning in ancient Rome". Acta Theologica. 26 (2): 147–64 (149–51). doi:10.4314/actat.v26i2.52570.
- Rich, V. (1994). The International Lead Trade. Woodhead Publishing. ISBN 978-0-85709-994-5.
- Rieuwerts, J. (2015). The Elements of Environmental Pollution. Routledge. ISBN 978-0-415-85919-6.
- Riva, M. A.; Lafranconi, A.; d'Orso, M. I.; et al. (2012). "Lead poisoning: Historical aspects of a paradigmatic "occupational and environmental disease"". Safety and Health at Work. 3 (1): 11–16. doi:10.5491/SHAW.2012.3.1.11. PMC 3430923. PMID 22953225.
- Roederer, I. U.; Kratz, K.-L.; Frebel, A.; et al. (2009). "The end of nucleosynthesis: Production of lead and thorium in the early galaxy". The Astrophysical Journal. 698 (2): 1963–80. arXiv:0904.3105. Bibcode:2009ApJ...698.1963R. doi:10.1088/0004-637X/698/2/1963. S2CID 14814446.
- Rogalski, A. (2010). Infrared Detectors (2nd ed.). CRC Press. ISBN 978-1-4200-7671-4.
- Röhr, C. (2017). "Binare Zintl-Phasen" [Binary Zintl Phases]. Intermetallische Phasen [Intermettallic Phases] (in German). Universitat Freiburg.
- Rudolph, A. M.; Rudolph, C. D.; Hostetter, M. K.; et al. (2003). "Lead". Rudolph's Pediatrics (21st ed.). McGraw-Hill Professional. p. 369. ISBN 978-0-8385-8285-5.
- Samson, G. W. (1885). The divine law as to wines. J. B. Lippincott & Co.
- Scarborough, J. (1984). "The myth of lead poisoning among the Romans: An essay review". Journal of the History of Medicine and Allied Sciences. 39 (4): 469–475. doi:10.1093/jhmas/39.4.469. PMID 6389691.
- Schoch, R. M. (1996). Case Studies in Environmental Science. West Publishing. ISBN 978-0-314-20397-7.
- Schoeters, G.; Den Hond, E.; Dhooge, W.; et al. (2008). "Endocrine disruptors and abnormalities of pubertal development" (PDF). Basic & Clinical Pharmacology & Toxicology. 102 (2): 168–175. doi:10.1111/j.1742-7843.2007.00180.x. hdl:1854/LU-391408. PMID 18226071.
- Sharma, H. R.; Nozawa, K.; Smerdon, J. A.; et al. (2013). "Templated three-dimensional growth of quasicrystalline lead". Nature Communications. 4 2715. Bibcode:2013NatCo...4.2715S. doi:10.1038/ncomms3715. PMID 24185350.
- Sharma, H. R.; Smerdon, J. A.; Nugent, P. J.; et al. (2014). "Crystalline and quasicrystalline allotropes of Pb formed on the fivefold surface of icosahedral Ag-In-Yb". The Journal of Chemical Physics. 140 (17): 174710. Bibcode:2014JChPh.140q4710S. doi:10.1063/1.4873596. PMID 24811658.
- Silverman, M. S. (1966). "High-pressure (70-k) synthesis of new crystalline lead dichalcogenides". Inorganic Chemistry. 5 (11): 2067–69. doi:10.1021/ic50045a056.
- Singh, P. (2017). "Over 73% of paints found to have excessive lead: Study". Times of India.
- Sinha, S. P.; Shelly; Sharma, V.; et al. (1993). "Neurotoxic effects of lead exposure among printing press workers". Bulletin of Environmental Contamination and Toxicology. 51 (4): 490–93. Bibcode:1993BuECT..51..490S. doi:10.1007/BF00192162. PMID 8400649. S2CID 26631583.
- Slater, J. C. (1964). "Atomic Radii in Crystals". The Journal of Chemical Physics. 41 (10): 3199–3204. Bibcode:1964JChPh..41.3199S. doi:10.1063/1.1725697. ISSN 0021-9606.
- Smirnov, A. Yu.; Borisevich, V. D.; Sulaberidze, A. (July 2012). "Evaluation of specific cost of obtainment of lead-208 isotope by gas centrifuges using various raw materials". Theoretical Foundations of Chemical Engineering. 46 (4): 373–378. doi:10.1134/s0040579512040161.
- Sokol, Rebecca C. (2005). "Lead exposure and its effects on the reproductive system". In Golub, M. S. (ed.). Metals, Fertility, and Reproductive Toxicity. CRC Press. pp. 117–53. ISBN 978-0-415-70040-5.
- Stabenow, F.; Saak, W.; Weidenbruch, M. (2003). "Tris(triphenylplumbyl)plumbate: An anion with three stretched lead–lead bonds". Chemical Communications (18): 2342–2343. doi:10.1039/B305217F. PMID 14518905.
- Stone, R. (1997). "An Element of Stability". Science. 278 (5338): 571–572. Bibcode:1997Sci...278..571S. doi:10.1126/science.278.5338.571. S2CID 117946028.
- Street, A.; Alexander, W. (1998). Metals in the Service of Man (11th ed.). Penguin Books. ISBN 978-0-14-025776-2.
- Szczepanowska, H. M. (2013). Conservation of Cultural Heritage: Key Principles and Approaches. Routledge. ISBN 978-0-415-67474-4.
- Takahashi, K.; Boyd, R. N.; Mathews, G. J.; et al. (1987). "Bound-state beta decay of highly ionized atoms" (PDF). Physical Review C. 36 (4): 1522–1528. Bibcode:1987PhRvC..36.1522T. doi:10.1103/physrevc.36.1522. OCLC 1639677. PMID 9954244. Archived from the original (PDF) on 21 October 2014.
- Tarragó, A. (2012). "Case Studies in Environmental Medicine (CSEM) Lead Toxicity" (PDF). Agency for Toxic Substances and Disease Registry. Archived from the original (PDF) on 13 October 2022.
- Tétreault, J.; Sirois, J.; Stamatopoulou, E. (1998). "Studies of lead corrosion in acetic acid environments". Studies in Conservation. 43 (1): 17–32. doi:10.2307/1506633. JSTOR 1506633.
- Theodore Low De Vinne (1899). The Practice of Typography: A Treatise on the Processes of Type-making, the Point System, the Names, Sizes, Styles, and Prices of Plain Printing Types. Century Company.
- "Think Lead research summary" (PDF). The Lead Sheet Association. Archived from the original (PDF) on 20 February 2017.
- Thomson, T. (1830). The History of Chemistry. Henry Colburn and Richard Bentley (publishers). ISBN 9780405066238.
- Thornton, I.; Rautiu, R.; Brush, S. M. (2001). Lead: The Facts (PDF). International Lead Association. ISBN 978-0-9542496-0-1. Archived from the original (PDF) on 26 July 2020.
- Thürmer, K.; Williams, E.; Reutt-Robey, J. (2002). "Autocatalytic oxidation of lead crystallite surfaces". Science. 297 (5589): 2033–35. Bibcode:2002Sci...297.2033T. doi:10.1126/science.297.5589.2033. PMID 12242437. S2CID 6166273.
- Tolliday, B. (2014). "Significant growth in lead usage underlines its importance to the global economy". International Lead Association. Archived from the original on 28 February 2017. "Global demand for lead has more than doubled since the early 1990s and almost 90% of use is now in lead–acid batteries"
- "Toronto museum explores history of contraceptives". ABC News. 2003.
- "Toxic Substances Portal – Lead". Agency for Toxic Substances and Disease Registry. Archived from the original on 6 June 2011.
- "Toxicological Profile for Lead" (PDF). Agency for Toxic Substances and Disease Registry/Division of Toxicology and Environmental Medicine. 2007. Archived from the original (PDF) on 1 July 2017.
- "Trace element emission from coal". IEA Clean Coal Centre. 2012. Archived from the original on 11 March 2020.
- Tuček, K.; Carlsson, J.; Wider, H. (2006). "Comparison of sodium and lead-cooled fast reactors regarding reactor physics aspects, severe safety and economical issues" (PDF). Nuclear Engineering and Design. 236 (14–16): 1589–98. Bibcode:2006NuEnD.236.1589T. doi:10.1016/j.nucengdes.2006.04.019.
- Tungate, M. (2011). Branded Beauty: How Marketing Changed the Way We Look. Kogan Page Publishers. ISBN 978-0-7494-6182-9.
- UK Marine SACs Project (1999). "Lead". Water Quality (Report). Archived from the original on 17 February 2020.
- United Nations Environment Programme (2010). Final review of scientific information on lead (PDF). Chemicals Branch, Division of Technology, Industry and Economics.
- United States Environmental Protection Agency (2010). "Metallurgical Industry:Secondary Lead Processing". AP 42 Compilation of Air Pollutant Emission Factors (5th ed.).
- United States Environmental Protection Agency (2000). "Regulatory Status of Waste Generated by Contractors and Residents from Lead-Based Paint Activities Conducted in Households (August 2000)".
- United States Environmental Protection Agency (2005). "Best Management Practices for Lead at Outdoor Shooting Ranges" (PDF).
- United States Food and Drug Administration (2015). Q3D Elemental Impurities Guidance for Industry (PDF) (Report). United States Department of Health and Human Services. p. 41. Archived from the original (PDF) on 10 February 2017.
- United States Geological Survey (1973). Geological Survey Professional Paper. United States Government Publishing Office. p. 314.
- United States Geological Survey (2005). Lead (PDF) (Report). Archived from the original (PDF) on 12 April 2019.
- United States Geological Survey (2017). "Lead" (PDF). Mineral Commodities Summaries.
- University of California Nuclear Forensic Search Project. "Decay Chains". Nuclear Forensics: A Scientific Search Problem.
- Vasmer, M. (1986–1987) [1950–1958]. Trubachyov, O. N.; Larin, B. O. (eds.). Этимологический словарь русского языка [Russisches etymologisches Worterbuch] (in Russian) (2nd ed.). Progress.
- Vogel, N. A.; Achilles, R. (2013). The Preservation and Repair of Historic Stained and Leaded Glass (PDF) (Report). United States Department of the Interior. Archived from the original (PDF) on 18 September 2013.
- Waldron, H. A. (1985). "Lead and lead poisoning in antiquity". Medical History. 29 (1): 107–08. doi:10.1017/S0025727300043878. PMC 1139494.
- Wani, A. L.; Ara, A.; Usman, J. A. (2015). "Lead toxicity: A review". Interdisciplinary Toxicology. 8 (2): 55–64. doi:10.1515/intox-2015-0009. PMC 4961898. PMID 27486361.
- Weast, R. C.; Astle, M. J.; Beyer, W. H. (1983). CRC Handbook of Chemistry and Physics: A Ready-reference Book of Chemical and Physical Data. CRC Press. ISBN 978-0-8493-0464-4.
- "Weatherings to Parapets and Cornices". The Lead Sheet Association. Archived from the original on 20 February 2017.
- Webb, G. A. (2000). Nuclear Magnetic Resonance. Royal Society of Chemistry. ISBN 978-0-85404-327-9.
- Webb, G. W.; Marsiglio, F.; Hirsch, J. E. (2015). "Superconductivity in the elements, alloys and simple compounds". Physica C: Superconductivity and Its Applications. 514: 17–27. arXiv:1502.04724. Bibcode:2015PhyC..514...17W. doi:10.1016/j.physc.2015.02.037. S2CID 119290828.
- Whitten, K. W.; Gailey, K. D.; David, R. E. (1996). General chemistry with qualitative analysis (3rd ed.). Saunders College. ISBN 978-0-03-012864-6.
- Wiberg, E.; Wiberg, N.; Holleman, A. F. (2001). Inorganic Chemistry. Academic Press. ISBN 978-0-12-352651-9.
- Wilkes, C. E.; Summers, J. W.; Daniels, C. A.; et al. (2005). PVC Handbook. Hanser. ISBN 978-1-56990-379-7.
- Willey, D. G. (1999). "The physics behind four amazing demonstrations — CSI". Skeptical Inquirer. 23 (6).
- Winder, C. (1993a). "The history of lead — Part 1". LEAD Action News. 2 (1). ISSN 1324-6011. Archived from the original on 31 August 2007.
- Winder, C. (1993b). "The history of lead — Part 3". LEAD Action News. 2 (3). ISSN 1324-6011. Archived from the original on 31 August 2007.
- Windholz, M. (1976). Merck Index of Chemicals and Drugs (9th ed.). Merck & Co. ISBN 978-0-911910-26-1. Monograph 8393.
- Wood, J. R.; Hsu, Y-T.; Bell, C. (2021). "Sending Laurion Back to the Future: Bronze Age Silver and the Source of Confusion" (PDF). Internet Archaeology. 56 (9). doi:10.11141/ia.56.9. S2CID 236973111.
- World Health Organization (1995). Environmental Health Criteria 165: Inorganic Lead (Report).
- World Health Organization (2000). "Lead" (PDF). Air quality guidelines for Europe. Regional Office for Europe. pp. 149–53. ISBN 978-92-890-1358-1. OCLC 475274390.
- World Health Organization (2018). "Lead poisoning and health".
- World Nuclear Association (2015). "Nuclear Radiation and Health Effects". Archived from the original on 24 December 2015.
- Wrackmeyer, B.; Horchler, K. (1990). "^{207}Pb-NMR Parameters". Annual Reports on NMR Spectroscopy. Vol. 22. Academic Press. pp. 249–303. doi:10.1016/S0066-4103(08)60257-4. ISBN 978-0-08-058405-8.
- Yong, L.; Hoffmann, S. D.; Fässler, T. F. (2006). "A low-dimensional arrangement of [Pb_{9}]^{4·} clusters in [K(18-crown-6)]_{2}K_{2}Pb_{9}·(en)_{1.5}". Inorganica Chimica Acta. 359 (15): 4774–78. doi:10.1016/j.ica.2006.04.017.
- Young, S. (2012). "Battling lead contamination, one fish bone at a time". Compass. United States Coast Guard. Archived from the original on 14 June 2013.
- Yu, L.; Yu, H. (2004). Chinese Coins: Money in History and Society. Long River Press. ISBN 978-1-59265-017-0.
- Zhang, X.; Yang, L.; Li, Y.; et al. (2012). "Impacts of lead/zinc mining and smelting on the environment and human health in China". Environmental Monitoring and Assessment. 184 (4): 2261–73. Bibcode:2012EMnAs.184.2261Z. doi:10.1007/s10661-011-2115-6. PMID 21573711. S2CID 20372810.
- Zhao, F. (2008). Information Technology Entrepreneurship and Innovation. IGI Global. p. 440. ISBN 978-1-59904-902-1.
- Zuckerman, J. J.; Hagen, A. P. (1989). Inorganic Reactions and Methods, the Formation of Bonds to Halogens. John Wiley & Sons. ISBN 978-0-471-18656-4.
- Zweifel, H. (2009). Plastics Additives Handbook. Hanser. ISBN 978-3-446-40801-2.
- Zýka, J. (1966). "Analytical study of the basic properties of lead tetraacetate as oxidizing agent". Pure and Applied Chemistry. 13 (4): 569–81. Bibcode:1966PApCh..13..569Z. doi:10.1351/pac196613040569. S2CID 96821219.
