= Veterinary World =

Peer-reviewed academic journal

- Discipline: Veterinary medicine, animal science
- Language: English
- Edited by: Anjum V. Sherasiya

Publication details
- History: 2008–present
- Publisher: Veterinary World (India)
- Frequency: Monthly
- Open access: Yes
- License: CC BY 4.0
- Impact factor: 2.3 (2025)

Standard abbreviations
- ISO 4: Vet. World

Indexing
- ISSN: 0972-8988 (print); 2231-0916 (web)
- LCCN: 2016243005
- OCLC no.: 471519503

Links
- Journal homepage; Online archive

Veterinary World is a monthly peer-reviewed open-access academic journal covering veterinary and animal sciences that was established in 2008. The editor-in-chief is Anjum V. Sherasiya.

== Abstracting and indexing ==
The journal is abstracted and indexed in:

- Directory of Open Access Journals
- EBSCO databases
- Embase
- Emerging Sources Citation Index
- Mir@bel
- ProQuest databases
- Scopus

According to the Journal Citation Reports, the journal has a 2024 impact factor of 2.0.
