= Lead oxide =

Lead oxides are a group of inorganic compounds with formulas including lead (Pb) and oxygen (O).

Common lead oxides include:

- Lead(II) oxide, PbO, litharge (α-PbO, tetragonal, red), massicot (β-PbO, orthorhombic, yellow)
- Lead tetroxide or red lead, Pb_{3}O_{4}, minium, which is a lead (II,IV) oxide and may be thought of as lead(II) orthoplumbate(IV) [Pb^{2+}]_{2}[PbO^{4−}_{4}], vivid orange crystals
- Lead dioxide (lead(IV) oxide), PbO_{2}, dark-brown or black powder, scrutinyite (α-PbO_{2}, orthorhombic), plattnerite (β-PbO_{2}, tetragonal)

Less common lead oxides are:

- Lead sesquioxide, Pb_{2}O_{3}, which is a lead (II,IV) oxide as well (lead(II) metaplumbate(IV) [Pb^{2+}][PbO^{2−}_{3}]), reddish yellow
- Pb_{12}O_{17}
- Pb_{12}O_{19}, monoclinic, dark-brown or black crystals
- The so-called black lead oxide, which is a mixture of PbO and fine-powdered Pb metal and used in the production of lead–acid batteries.
