= Waldies =

Indian mining and chemicals company

Waldies Compound Limited
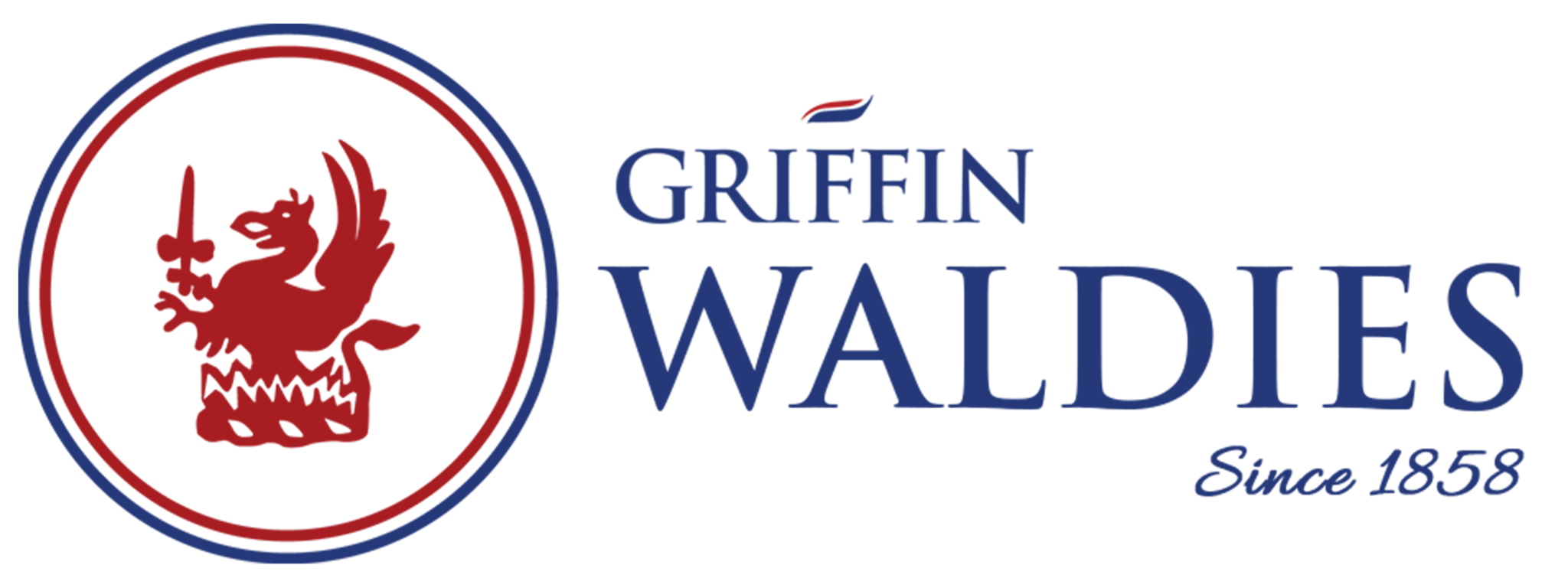
- Company type: Public Company
- Industry: Chemical, metals & mining
- Founded: 1858
- Founders: Dr. David Waldie
- Headquarters: Kolkata, West Bengal
- Key people: Dr. David Waldie (Founder); Deepak Ojha (Managing Director); Sameer Agarwal (Chairman); Sushil Ojha (CEO)
- Products: Manufacturing of red lead, Manufacturing of PVC stabilizers
- Number of employees: 100-500
- Parent: Ananthaksha Chemical Products Ltd.
- Website: www.waldies.com

Waldies Compound Limited (Waldies) (ISO – 9001; ISO – 14001 & OHSAS – 18001 certified) is an Indian chemical company It is India's oldest manufacturer of lead oxides. It is headquartered in Kolkata, West Bengal.

The company produces red lead, litharge, polyvinyl chloride (PVC) stabilizers and lubricants across India.

== History ==
Waldies was established in 1858 by Dr. David Waldie, a Scottish chemist who moved to India. It has been suggested that Waldie was responsible for the original formulation of chloroform. Waldies were frontrunners in the development of the chemical industry in India and were the first to manufacture oxides of lead on a large scale.

In November 1967, the company was incorporated under the name D. Waldie & Company (Lead Oxides) Ltd' renamed in 1968 to Waldies Limited. Previous to being purchased by Ananthaksha Chemical Products Ltd. in 2017 their parent company was Gillanders Arbuthnot & Co.

== Operations ==
The company produces red lead, litharge, polyvinyl chloride (PVC) stabilizers and lubricants. Waldies has offices in Rajasthan, New Delhi, West Bengal and manufacturing facilities in West Bengal and Odisha. The company has been praised several times over the years for its role in the development of the industrial chemicals industry in India.

Waldies is headquartered in Kolkata, West Bengal. The managing director is Deepak Ojha, who succeeded D.K. Sharda of Gillanders Arbuthnot & Co. Ltd. The company owns Griffin and Ducatus and recently launched D'Wall, a brand aimed at the construction industry.

== See also ==
- Chemical industry
- List of companies of India
- Bengal Chemicals and Pharmaceuticals
- Vivimed Labs
- Pescafresh
