= Wujing Zongyao =

11th-century Chinese military manuscript

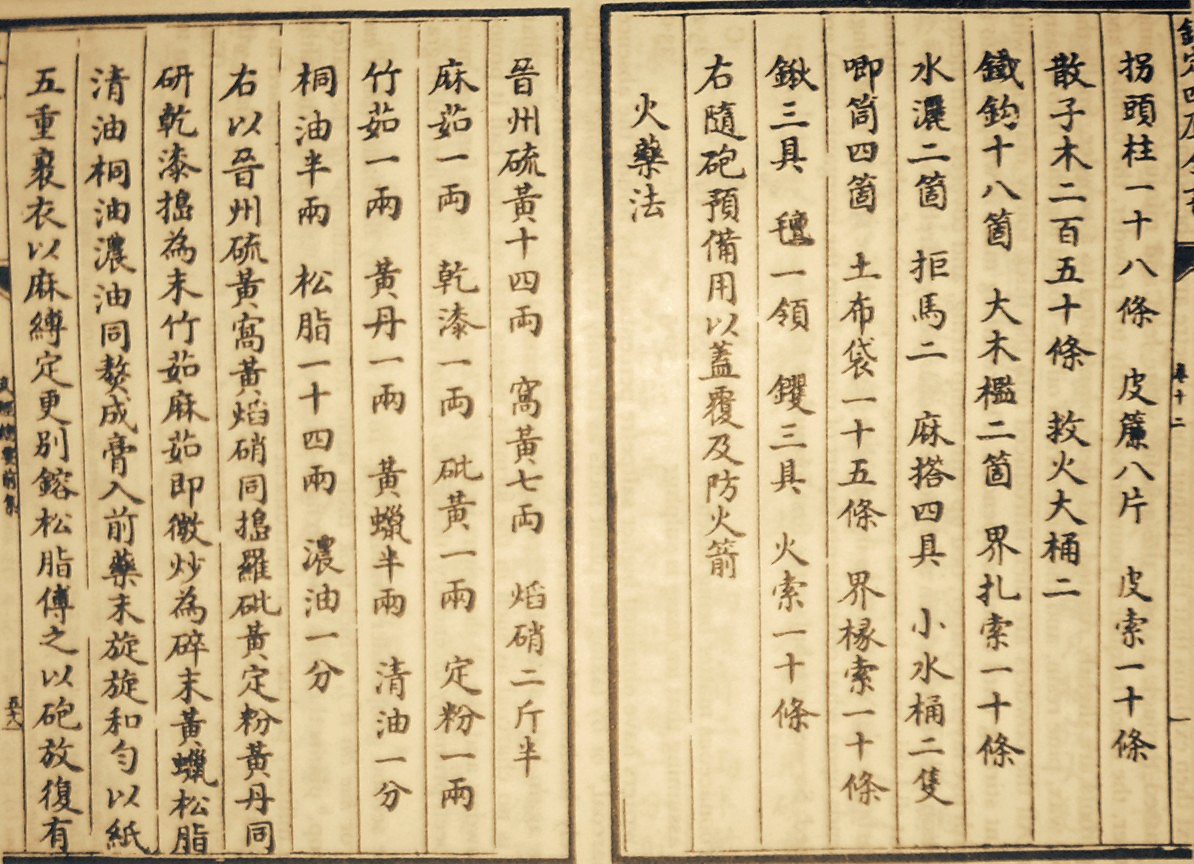
- A page with the formula for gunpowder from the Wujing Zongyao manuscript
- Traditional Chinese: 武經總要
- Simplified Chinese: 武经总要
- Literal meaning: Collection of the Most Important Military Techniques
Transcriptions
Standard Mandarin
- Hanyu Pinyin: Wǔjīng Zǒngyào
- Wade–Giles: Wu^{3}-ching^{1} Tsung^{3}-yao^{4}
Southern Min
- Hokkien POJ: Bú-keng Chóng-iàu

The Wujing Zongyao (Chinese: 武經總要), sometimes rendered in English as the Complete Essentials for the Military Classics, is a Chinese military compendium written from around 1040 to 1044.

The book was compiled during the Northern Song dynasty by Zeng Gongliang (曾公亮), Ding Du (丁度) and Yang Weide (楊惟德), whose writing influenced many later Chinese military writers. The compendium was published under the auspices of Emperor Renzong of Song, who also authored the book's preface. The book covers a wide range of subjects, including everything from naval warships to different types of catapults. It contains the earliest known written chemical formulas for gunpowder, made from saltpeter, sulphur and charcoal along with many added ingredients. In addition to formulas for gunpowder, the compendium also contains details on various other gunpowder weapons such as fire arrows, incendiary bombs and projectiles, and grenades and smoke bombs. It also describes an early form of the compass (using thermoremanence), and has the oldest illustration of a Chinese flamethrower with a double-action dual-piston cylinder-pump capable of shooting a continuous blast of flame.

== History ==
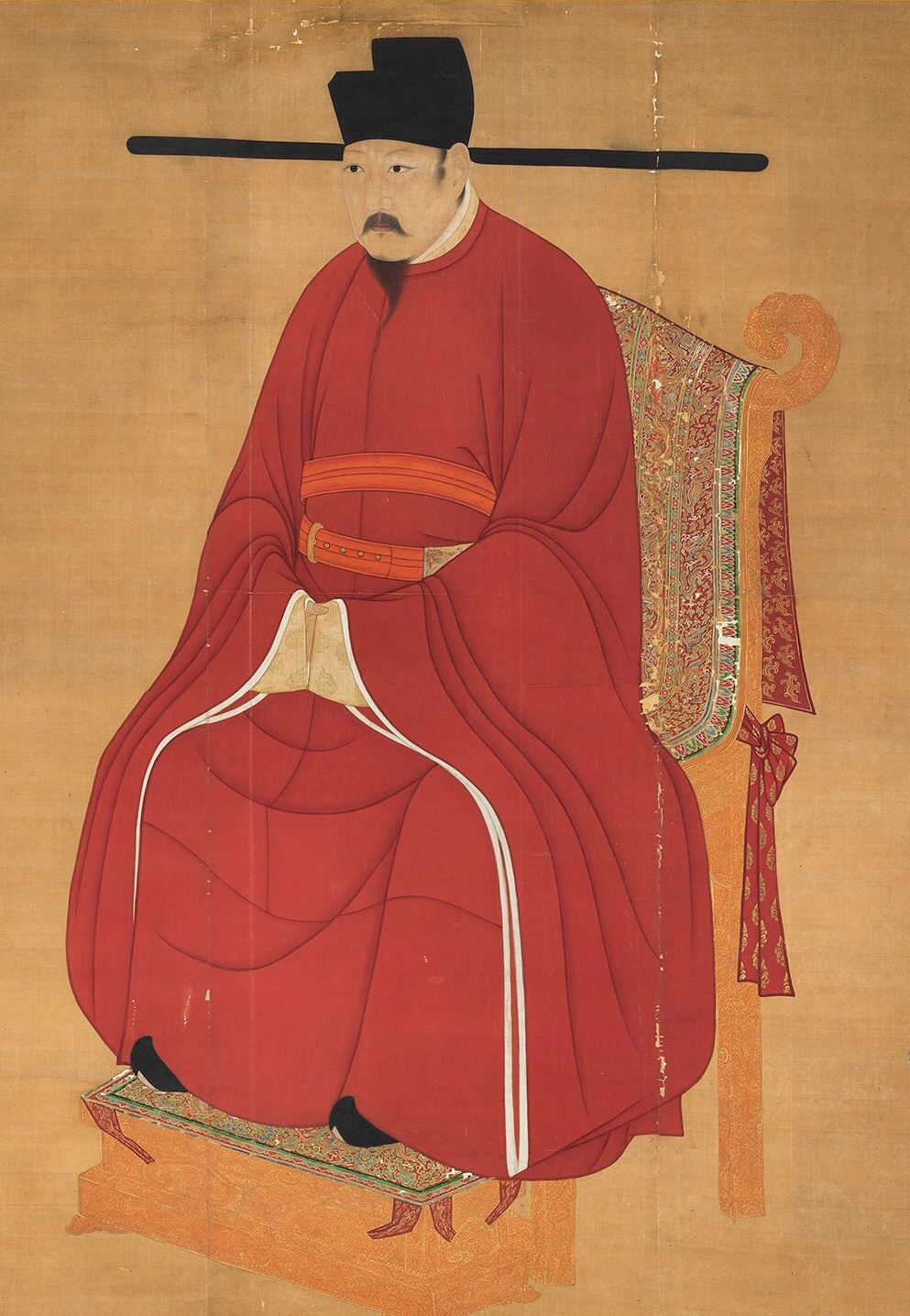
Court portrait of Emperor Renzong

The Wujing Zongyao was compiled under the sponsorship of Emperor Renzong of Song (r. 1022–1063 AD), who was concerned that many officials were unfamiliar with the military classics, and partially as a response to the Song dynasty's war with the Tanguts of Western Xia.

A team of scholars worked from 1040 to 1044 to compile the Wujing Zongyao with the intent to collect all known military knowledge and to disseminate it to a wider government audience. Its chief editor, Zeng Gongliang, was assisted by the astronomer Yang Weide and the scholar Ding Du. After five years, the book was published with a preface authored by Emperor Renzong himself. Lorge remarks that Zeng Gongliang, the chief editor, was a government official rather than a military general, implying that the Wujing Zongyao was likely written for other government officials.

Parts of the Wujing Zongyao were copied from older sources; historian Ralph D. Sawyer calls it "essentially a cut-and-paste job", containing many passages from earlier classical military writings whose original authors are left unidentified, a common practice at the time. During the Song dynasty, the Wujing Zongyao was appended to two other books: the Xingjun xuzhi and the Baizhan qifa, both written by anonymous authors.

The Wujing Zongyao was one of 347 military treatises listed in the biographical chapters of the History of Song (1345 AD), one of the Twenty-Four Histories. Of these 347 different military treatises from the Song period, only the Wujing Zongyao, the Huqianjing (Tiger Seal Manual) of Xu Dong in 1004 AD, and fragments of similar works found in the later Yongle Dadian, have survived. The original text of the Wujing Zongyao was kept in the Imperial Library while a number of hand-written copies were distributed elsewhere, including a copy given to Wang Shao by Emperor Shenzong of Song in 1069 AD.

The original copy of the Wujing Zongyao was lost during the Jin–Song wars when the invading Jurchens sacked the Northern Song capital of Kaifeng in 1126 AD. Only a few manuscripts survived as a result of its secretive nature. Very few trustees of the government were ever allowed to read it as increased propagation would have increased the chance of it falling into enemy hands. A remaining copy of the Wujing Zongyao was remade into a newly published edition in 1231 AD in the Southern Song dynasty. During the Ming dynasty (1368–1644 AD), another book was published in 1439 AD featuring fragments of the Wujing Zongyao of 1231 while omitting some material and combining it with two other books, including a preface by Li Jin. The entire Wujing Zongyao was reprinted in 1510 AD and this version is currently the oldest extant copy available. However, the historian Joseph Needham asserts that the 1510 AD edition is the most reliable in its faithfulness to the original version, since it was printed from blocks that were re-carved directly from tracings of the edition made in 1231 AD, rather than recombining fragments of the original with other material.

After the Wujing Zongyao of 1510 was printed, other Ming copies were made. This included the Jiajing edition (1522–1566 AD), the Wanli edition (1573–1619 AD) of Quanzhou, and the Wanli edition (1573–1619) of Jinling by Tang Xinyün (preserved by Cunjingge). During the Qing dynasty (1644–1911 AD) it was also reprinted in two different editions during the 18th century, and again in 1934 with the Shanghai edition.

The Xu Wujing Zongyao (續武經總要; literally "Continuation of Wujing Zongyao") is a "continuation" of the Wujing Zongyao written in the late Ming dynasty. The book focuses primarily on army formations and military deployments. It was written by Fan Jingwen (1587–1644), who was then the Vice President of the Board of War (兵部尚書; bingbu shangshu). Fan wrote the book because he felt that reprints of the Wujing Zongyao circulating at that time were out of date and did not take into account the technological and strategic changes that had occurred since the Song dynasty. The only surviving copy of the Xu Wujing Zongyao is held by Fudan University Library.

== Compass and navigation ==
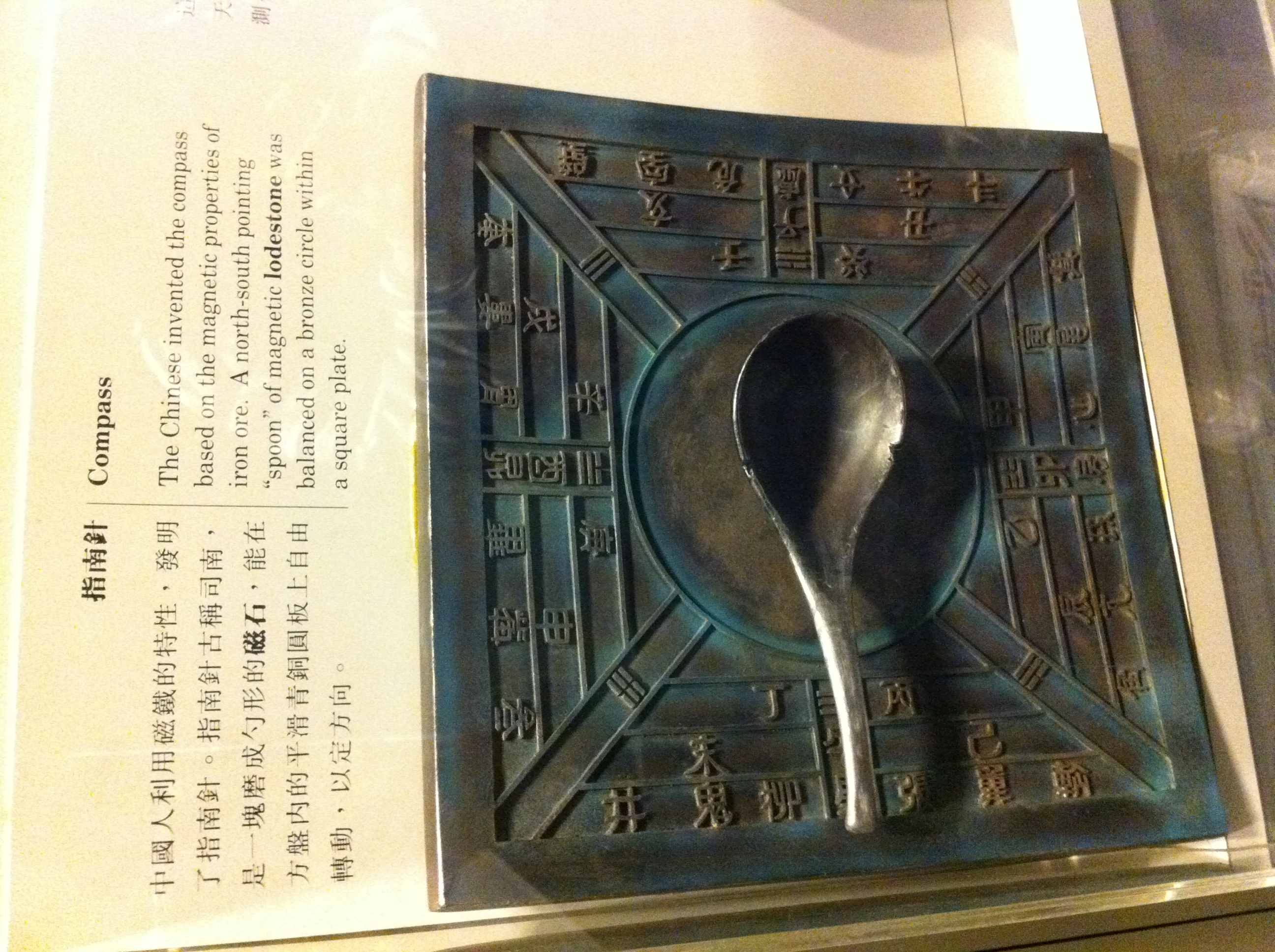
Model of a Chinese compass from the Hong Kong Space Museum

In the 3rd century, the Chinese engineer Ma Jun invented the south-pointing chariot. This was a wheeled vehicle that employed differential gearing in order to lock a figurine of an immortal in place on the end of a long wooden staff, the figure having its arm stretched out and always pointing to the southern cardinal direction. Although the authors of the Wujing Zongyao were mistaken in believing that the design of the south-pointing chariot was not handed down (as it was reinvented during the Song period and combined with an odometer), they described a new device which allowed one to navigate. This was the 'south pointing fish' (a thermoremanence compass), essentially a heated iron (or preferably steel) object cut in the shape of a fish and suspended in a bowl of water. The Wujing Zongyao part 1 volume 15 text stated:

When troops encountered gloomy weather or dark nights, and the directions of space could not be distinguished, they let an old horse go on before to lead them, or else they made use of the south-pointing carriage, or the south-pointing fish to identify the directions. Now the carriage method has not been handed down, but in the fish method a thin leaf of iron is cut into the shape of a fish two inches long and half an inch broad, having a pointed head and tail. This is then heated in a charcoal fire, and when it has become thoroughly red-hot, it is taken out by the head with iron tongs and placed so that its tail points due north. In this position it is quenched with water in a basin, so that its tail is submerged for several tenths of an inch. It is then kept in a tightly closed box. To use it, a small bowl filled with water is set up in a windless place, and the fish is laid as flat as possible upon the water-surface so that it floats, whereupon its head will point south.

Later on in the Song dynasty the compass was used with maritime navigation. Several decades after the Wujing Zongyao was written, the scientist and statesman Shen Kuo (1031–1095 AD) wrote of the first truly magnetized compass needle in his book Dream Pool Essays (1088 AD). With a more efficient compass magnetized by lodestone, the thermoremanence compass fell out of use. The later maritime author Zhu Yu wrote of the magnetic needle compass as a means to navigate at sea in his Pingzhou Table Talks of 1119 AD.

== Naval technology ==
The Wujing Zongyao's illustrated descriptions of warships had a significant influence on later naval handbooks and encyclopedias such as the naval section of the Wubei Zhi from circa 1628. These works would incorporate illustrations of ships originally from the Wujing Zongyao. The use of pictures from the Wujing Zongyao would continue to appear in Japanese naval texts up until the 18th century. The illustrations were used by both Nishikawa Joken's Ka-i Tsūshō-kō (Studies on the Intercourse and Trade with Chinese and Barbarians) in 1708 and Kanazawa Kanemitsu's Wakan Senyōshū (Collected Studies on the Ships used by the Chinese and Japanese) in 1766.

The Wujing Zongyao divides Chinese warships into six categories: Tower ships (lou chuan), combat or war junks (dou xian or zhan xian), covered swoopers (meng chong), flying barques (zou ge), patrol boats (you ting), and sea hawk ships (hai hu). The Wujing Zongyao's typology for classifying Chinese warships would reappear in later naval texts for many centuries.

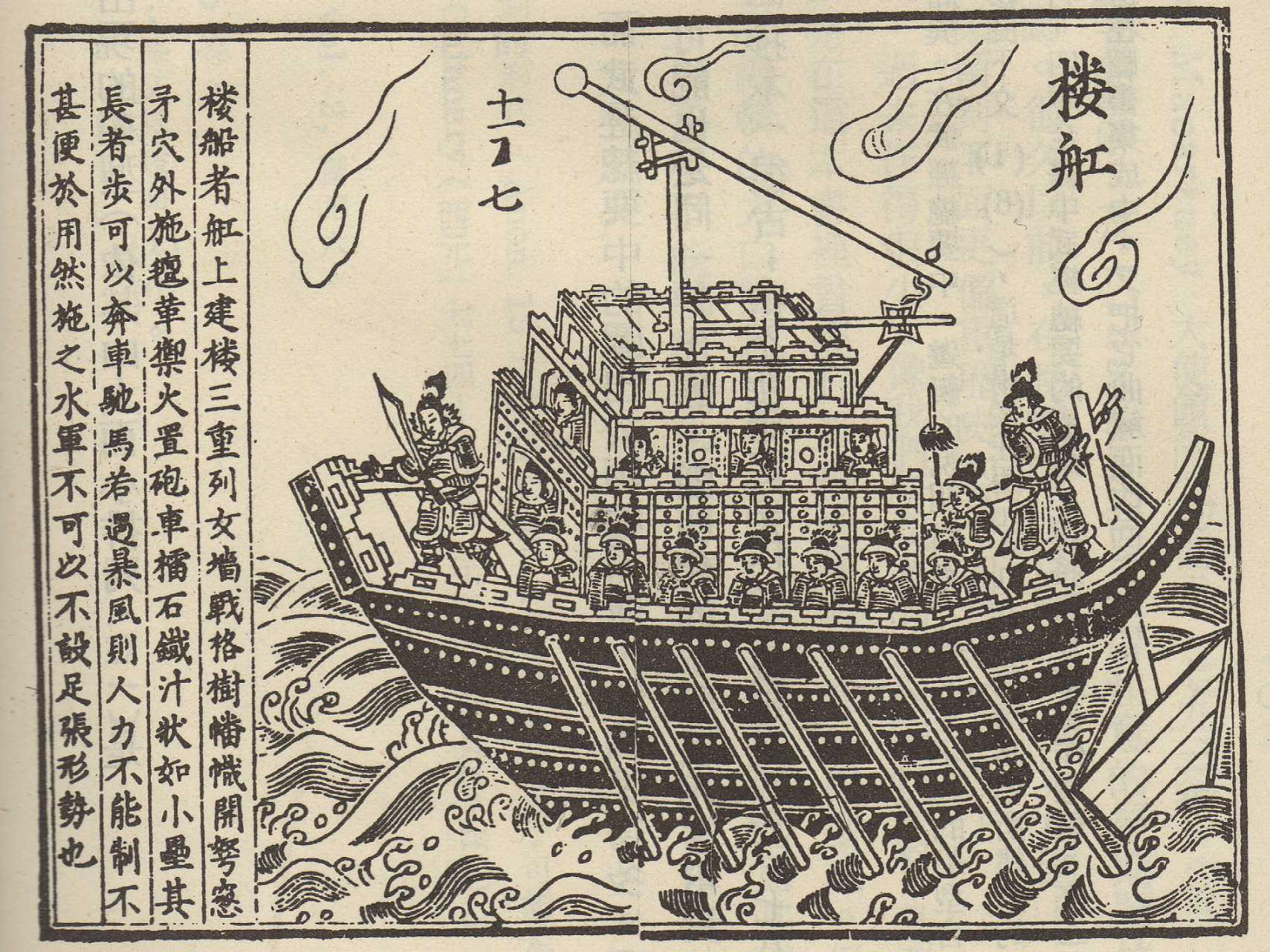
A "tower" ship with a traction-trebuchet on its top deck, from the Wujing Zongyao

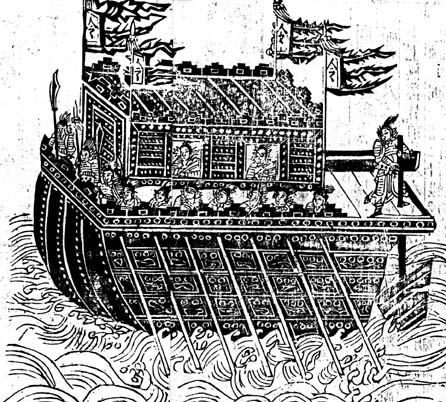
A "combat" ship from the Wujing Zongyao

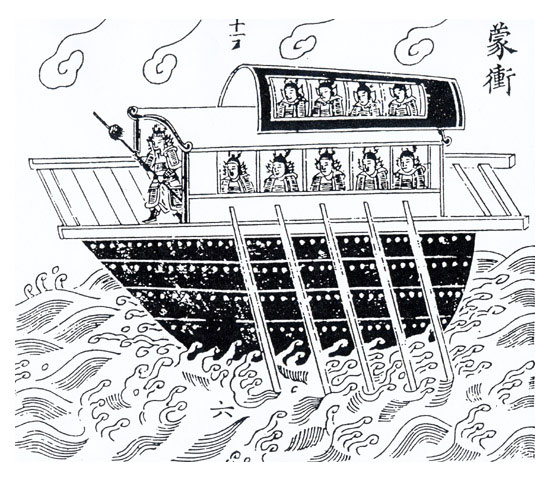
A "covered assault" ship from the Wujing Zongyao

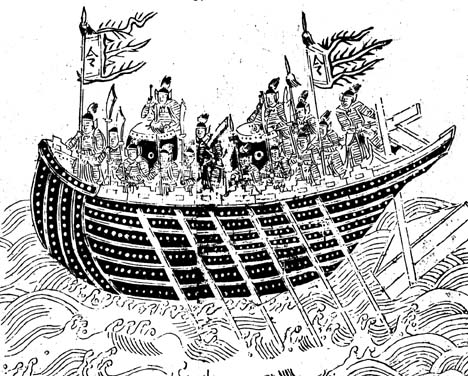
A "flying" barque from the Wujing Zongyao

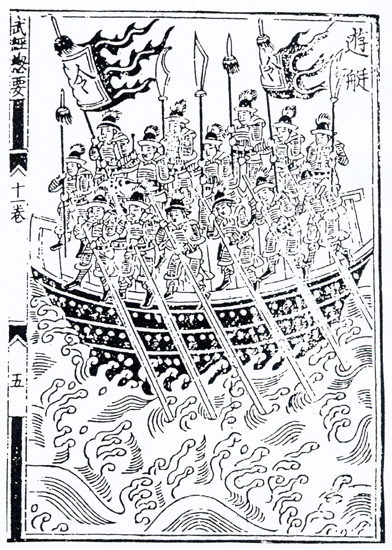
A "patrol" boat from the Wujing Zongyao

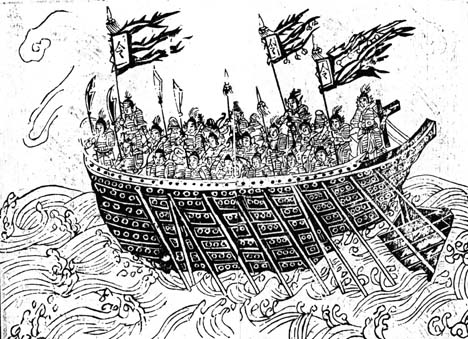
A "sea hawk" ship from the Wujing Zongyao

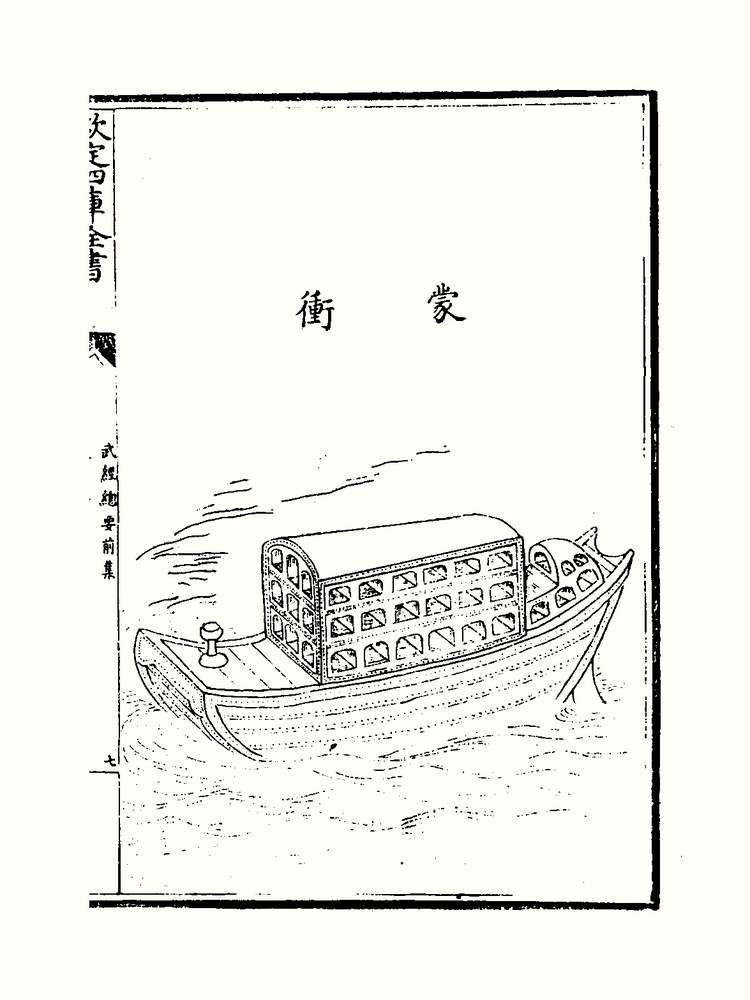
A "meng chong" (covered assault ship)

== Gunpowder ==
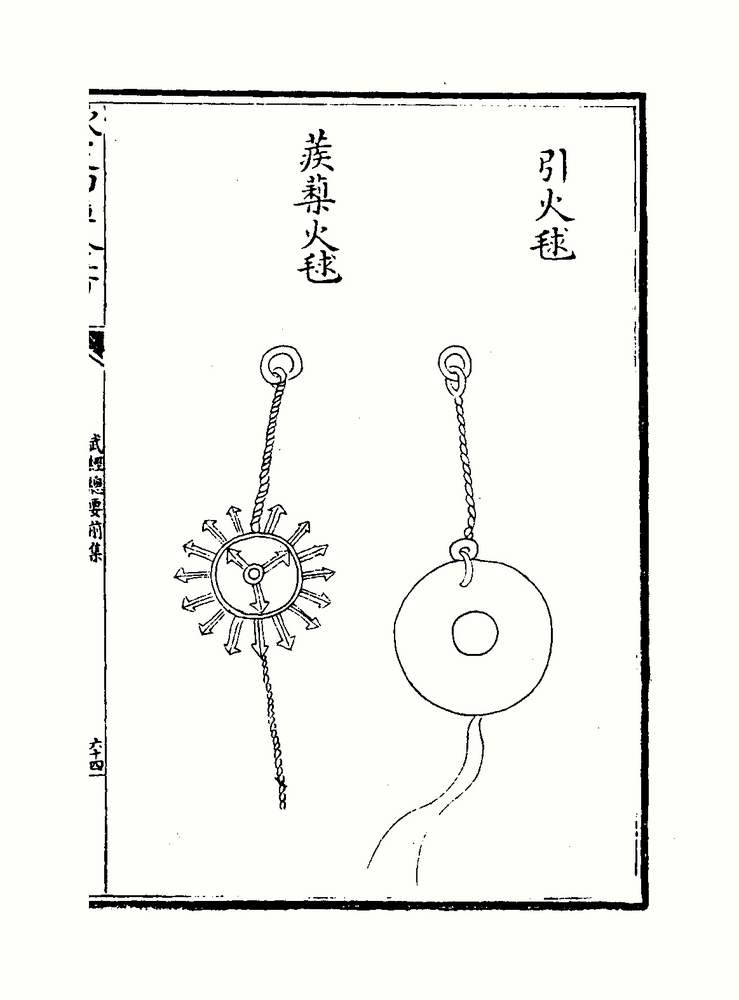
An 'igniter fire ball' and 'barbed fire ball' from the Wujing Zongyao.

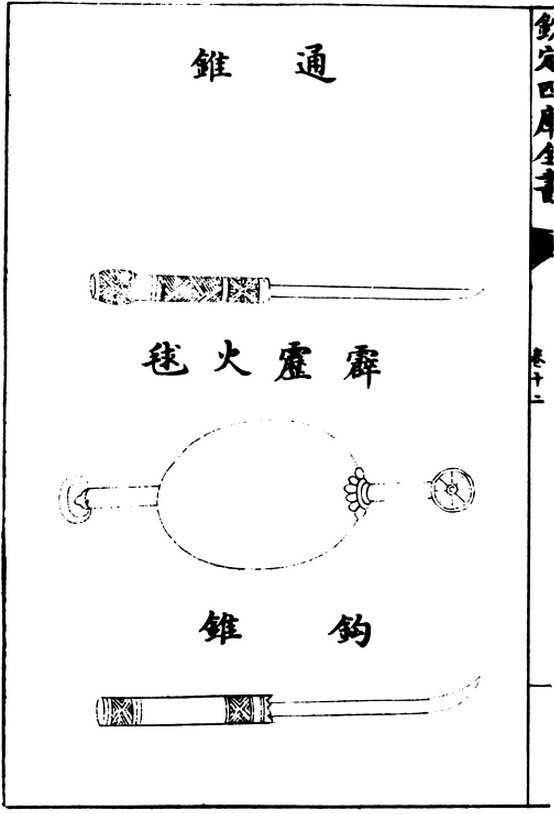
An illustration of a 'thunderclap bomb' (pi li huo qiu) as depicted in the 1044 text Wujing Zongyao. The top item is a through awl and the bottom one is a hook awl, used to ignite the projectile before it was hurled.

=== Gunpowder weapons ===
The Wujing Zongyao records detailed descriptions of gunpowder weapons such as incendiary projectiles, smoke bombs, fire arrows, and grenades. It documents incendiary projectiles containing low-nitrate gunpowder, which were launched from catapults or lowered down from city walls onto besiegers. Examples of these incendiaries include the "swallow-tail" incendiary (燕尾炬; yanweiju) and the flying incendiary (飛炬; feiju). The swallow-tail incendiary was made of straw tied together and dipped in fat or oil. Chinese soldiers defending a city under siege would light the incendiary and lower it onto any wooden structure of the invading army to engulf it in fire. The flying incendiary visually resembled the swallow-tail incendiary, but was lowered using an iron chain from a swape lever installed within the walls of the city. The book also describes an 'igniter ball' used in warfare and for finding the firing range. The Wujing Zongyao stated the following:

The 'igniter ball' (yin huo qiu) is made of paper round like a ball, inside which is put between three and five pounds of powdered bricks. Melt yellow wax and let it stand until clear, then add powdered charcoal and make it into a paste permeating the ball; bind it up with hempen string. When you want to find the range of anything, shoot off this fire-ball first, then other incendiary balls can follow.

Gunpowder was attached to fire arrows (火箭) and utilized as an incendiary. The Wujing Zongyao records that fire arrows were launched from bows or crossbows. The gunpowder used for fire arrows was likely a low-nitrate powder, and the quantity of gunpowder varied according to the type of bow. In the book, the force of gunpowder is said to be enough to launch an arrow, but only when the elasticity of the crossbow is sufficient.

The Wujing Zongyao discusses various types of incendiary bombs and grenades. They used a low-nitrate gunpowder that, while not powerful enough to cause an explosion, was effective for incendiary weapons. The huoqiu (火毬; literally "fire ball") was filled with gunpowder and launched using a trebuchet. Upon impact, the huoqiu would start a fire among an invading army. Chinese bombs such as the thunder clap bomb or pili pao used a greater percentage of gunpowder than that of the huoqiu. The gunpowder mixture for a bomb was placed within a rigid container that held in the expanding gas, allowing for more powerful explosions. The thunder clap bomb was constructed with a container made from bamboo.

In the Wujing Zongyao and other military texts, the distinction between a bomb and a grenade is ambiguous. At the time, the Chinese usually did not categorize gunpowder weapons according to their delivery method. One of the few exceptions is the shoupao, or hand bomb, which is analogous to the hand grenade.

=== Formulas ===
Gunpowder had already been invented prior to the Wujing Zongyao by Chinese alchemists in the 9th century. Early references to gunpowder can be found in the Daoist book Zhenyuan miaodao yaolue, written circa 850, and gunpowder was utilized in Chinese warfare as early as the 10th century in fire arrows and gunpowder fuses used to light the Chinese two-piston flamethrower.

However it was not until the Wujing Zongyao that the exact chemical formulas for early Chinese gunpowder were revealed. The Wujing Zongyao contains three formulas for gunpowder: one for an explosive bomb launched from a trebuchet, another for a similar bomb with hooks attached so that it could latch on to any wooden structure and set it on fire, and another formula specified for a poison-smoke bomb used for chemical warfare.

The Wujing Zongyao's first recorded gunpowder formula used in these bombs held a potassium nitrate level of 55.4% to 55.5%, sulfur content of 19.4% to 26.5%, and carbonaceous content of 23% to 25.2%. The first step for making gunpowder is to powder and mix together sulphur, saltpetre, charcoal, pitch, and dried lacquer. Tung oil, dried plants, and wax are mixed next to create a paste. The paste and powder are combined and carefully stirred. Then the mixture is placed inside a paper container, wrapped up, and tied using hemp twine. Several precautions are taken to prevent the gunpowder from becoming damp.

For the second formula, the inner ball alone had a nitrate percentage of 61.5% to 50.2%, a sulfur content of 30.8% to 25.1%, and if all carbonaceous matter was taken, 24.7%, if just taking the charcoal content alone, the carbon level was 7.7%. If the outer coating and inner ball are both included with the second black-powder formula, that would yield a nitrate level of 34.7% to 54.8%, a sulfur content of 17.4% to 27.4%, and if all carbonaceous material is used, 47.9% carbon, if only charcoal is used, 17.8%. If the inner ball of the third black-powder formula is only considered, it held nitrate levels of 39.6% if all carbonaceous matter was taken, 49.4% nitrate if excluding the poisons, and 60% if charcoal is specified alone. The sulfur content was 19.8% if all carbonaceous matter was considered, 24.7% if this excluded poisons, and 30% if charcoal is specified alone. The carbon content was 40.5% if all carbonaceous matter was considered, 25.9% if this excluded poisons, and 10% if charcoal alone was specified. If both the inner ball and outer coating are considered for the third formula, that would yield a nitrate level of 27% if all carbonaceous matter was taken, 31.2% if this excluded poisons, and 51.7% if charcoal alone was used. The sulfur content would be 13.5% if all carbonaceous matter was taken, 15.6% if this excluded the poisons, and 25.9% if only charcoal alone was specified. The carbon content was 59.5% if all carbonaceous matter was taken into account, 53.2% if this excluded poisons, and 22.4% if charcoal alone was specified.

The first black-powder concoction was simply labeled as the "method for making the fire-chemical", with its ingredients and measured weight (in ounces) of each ingredient listed in the section below with the others listed in similar fashion.

Fireball formula

- Sulfur (14 oz.)
- Wo huang ('nest yellow', perhaps nodular sulfur) (7 oz.)
- Saltpetre (40 oz.)
- Hemp roots (1 oz.)
- Dried lacquer (1 oz.)
- Arsenic (1 oz.)
- White lead (lead carbonate) (1 oz.)
- Bamboo roots (1 oz.)
- Minium (lead tetroxide) (1 oz.)
- Yellow wax (0.5 oz.)
- Clear oil (0.1 oz.)
- Tung oil (0.5 oz.)
- Pine resin (14 oz.)
- Thick oil (0.1 oz.)

Total weight = 82.2 oz.

Caltrop fireball formula

Inner ball

- Sulphur (20 oz.)
- Saltpetre (40 oz.)
- Coarse charcoal powder (5 oz.)
- Pitch (2.5 oz.)
- Dried lacquer (pounded to powder) (2.5 oz.)
- Bamboo roots (1.1 oz.)
- Hemp roots, cut into shreds (1.1 oz.)
- Tung oil (2.5 oz.)
- Lesser oil (possibly an edible oil) (2.5 oz.)
- Wax (2.5 oz.)

Total weight of inner ball = 79.7 oz.

Outer coating

- Paper (12.5 oz.)
- Hemp (fibre) (10 oz.)
- Minium (1.1 oz)
- Charcoal powder (8 oz.)
- Pitch (2.5 oz)
- Yellow wax (2.5 oz)

Total weight of outer coating = 36.6 oz.

Total weight = 116.3 oz.

Poisonous smoke ball formula

Inner ball

- Sulphur (15 oz.)
- Saltpetre (30 oz.)
- Aconite (aconitum fischeri) (5 oz.)
- Croton oil (croton tiglium) (5 oz.)
- Wolfsbane (aconitum ferox or lycoctonum) (5 oz.)
- Tung oil (5 oz.)
- Lesser oil (2.5 oz.)
- Charcoal powder (5 oz.)
- Pitch (5 oz.)
- Arsenic (2 oz.)
- Yellow wax (1 oz.)
- Bamboo roots (1.1 oz.)
- Hemp roots (1.1 oz.)

Total weight of inner ball = 77.7 oz.

Outer coating

- Old paper (12.5 oz.)
- Hemp (stalk) skin fibre (10 oz.)
- Pitch (2.5 oz.)
- Yellow wax (2.5 oz.)
- Minium (1.1 oz.)
- Charcoal (8 oz.)

Total weight of outer coating = 36.6 oz.

Total weight = 114.3 oz.

== Double-acting piston flamethrower ==
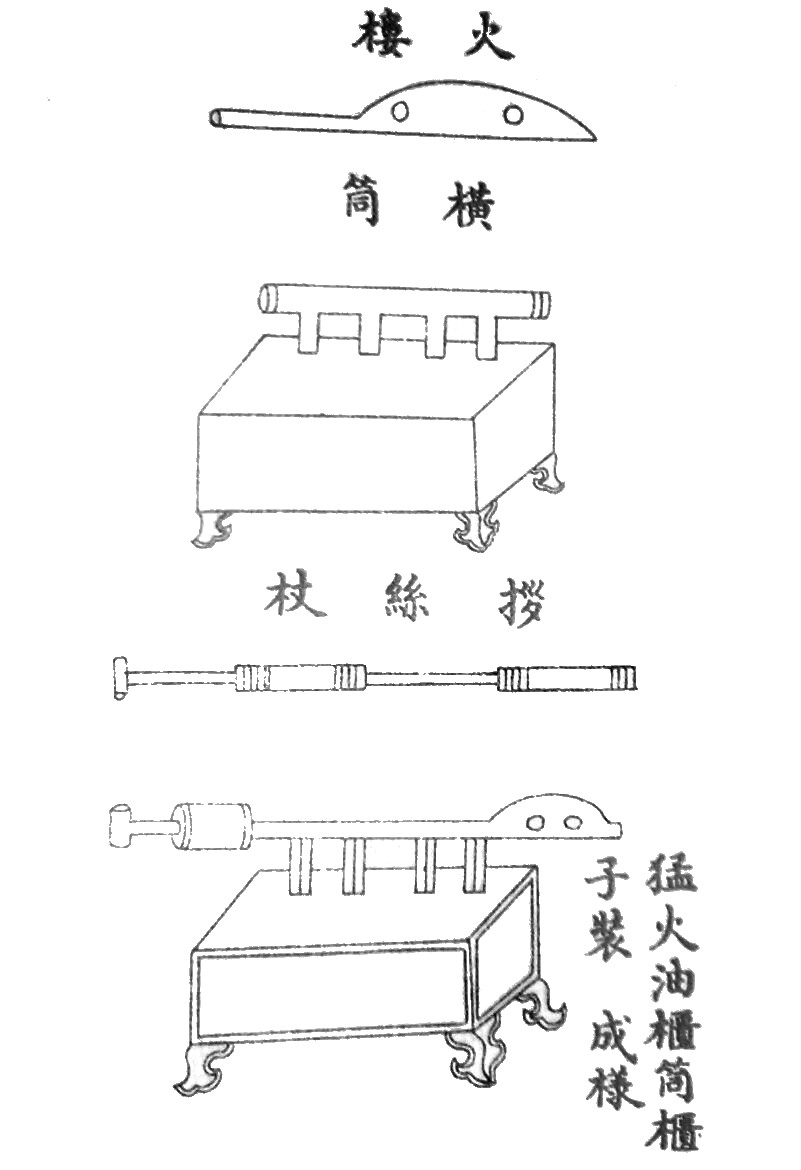
A Chinese flamethrower from the Wujing Zongyao

The Wujing Zongyao describes a flamethrower with a double-acting two-piston cylinder-pump capable of shooting a continuous blast of flame. The first Chinese battle to use the double-piston pump flamethrower was the Battle of Langshan Jiang in 919 AD. In the Battle of Langshan Jiang (Wolf Mountain River, 狼山江), the naval fleet of the Wenmu King of Wuyue defeated the fleet of the Kingdom of Wu because he had used 'fire oil' (huo yóu, 火油) to burn his fleet; this signified the first Chinese use of gunpowder in warfare, since a slow-burning match fuse was required to ignite the flames. Greek fire is likely based on distilled petroleum and is a weapon of Byzantine origin. The Chinese author Lin Yu explained in his book of 919 AD that Greek fire was acquired from their Arab maritime trade contacts in the Indian Ocean. Furthermore, the Chinese had been using the piston syringe since the Han dynasty (202 BC – 220 AD). However, it was the later Wujing Zongyao that would provide the first illustrated drawing and greater textual explanation for how this flamethrower operated. In describing the drawn illustration of the flamethrower in the book, the Wujing Zongyao states:

On the right is the petrol flamethrower (lit. fierce fire oil-shooter). The tank is made of brass, and supported on four legs. From its upper surface arise four (vertical) tubes attached to a horizontal cylinder above; they are all connected with the tank. The head and the tail of the cylinder are large (the middle) is of narrow (diameter). In the tail end there is a small opening as big as a millet grain. The head end has (two) round openings 1½ inches in diameter. At the side of the tank there is a hole with a (little) tube which is used for filling, and this is fitted with a cover. Inside the cylinder there is a (piston-)rod packed with silk floss, the head of which is wound round with hemp waste about ½ inches thick. Before and behind, the two communicating tubes are (alternately) occluded (lit. controlled), and (the mechanism) thus determined. The tail has a horizontal handle (the pump handle), in front of which there is a round cover. When (the handle is pushed) in (the pistons) close the mouth of the tubes (in turn).

Before use the tank is filled with rather more than three catties of the oil with a spoon through a filter; at the same time gunpowder (composition) is placed in the ignition chamber at the head. When the fire is to be started one applies a heated branding iron (to the ignition chamber), and the piston-rod is forced fully into the cylinder—then the man at the back is ordered to draw the piston rod fully backwards and work it (back and forth) as vigorously as possible. Whereupon the oil (the petrol) comes out through the ignition chamber and is shot forth as blazing flame.

Then the text goes on to provide further instructions about equipment, maintenance, and repair of flamethrowers:

When filling, use the bowl, the spoon and filter; for igniting there is the branding iron; for maintaining (or renewing) the fire there is the container. The branding iron is made sharp like an awl so that it may be used to unblock the tubes if they get stopped up. There are tongs with which to pick up the glowing fire, and there is a soldering iron for stopping up leaks. If the tanks or the tubes get cracked and leak they may be mended by using green wax. Altogether there are 12 items of equipment, all of brass except the tongs, the branding iron, and the soldering iron. Another method is to fix a brass gourd-shaped container inside a large tube; below it has two feet, and inside there are two small feet communicating with them (comm: all made of brass) and there is also the piston. The method of shooting is as described above. If the enemy comes to attack a city, these weapons are placed on the great ramparts, or else in outworks, so that large numbers of assailants cannot get through.

== Illustrations from the Wujing Zongyao ==
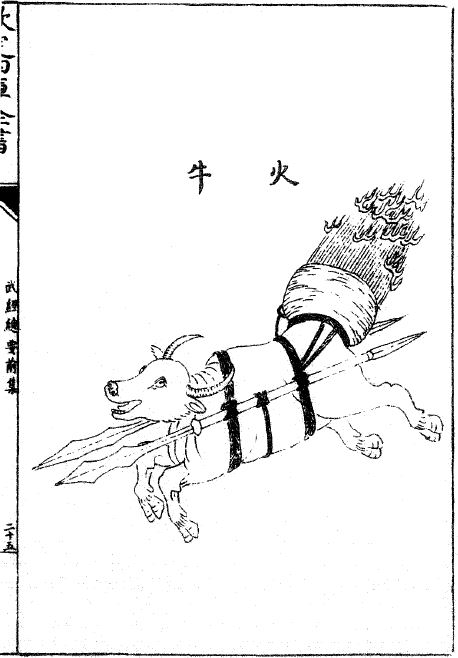
The "fire ox" is an ox with two spears tied by its sides, set mad by burning its tail

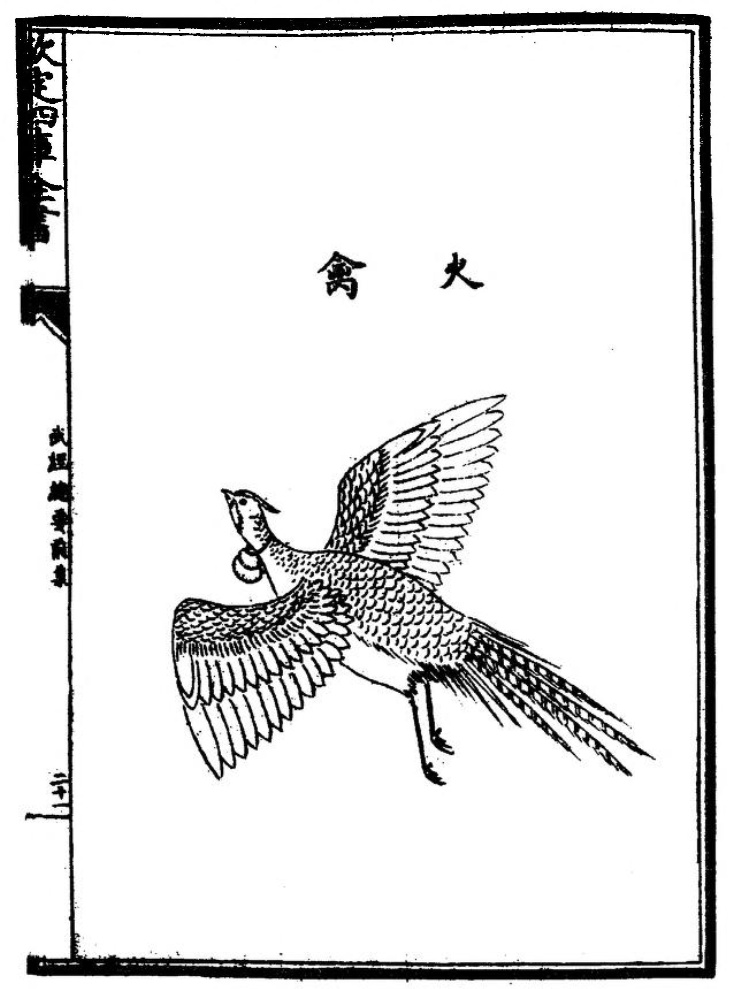
Bird with an incendiary around its neck

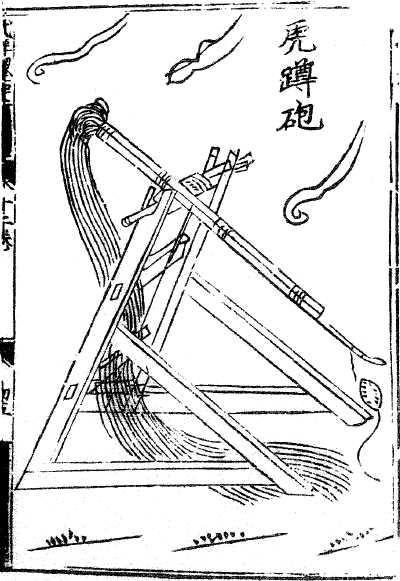
Crouching tiger trebuchet

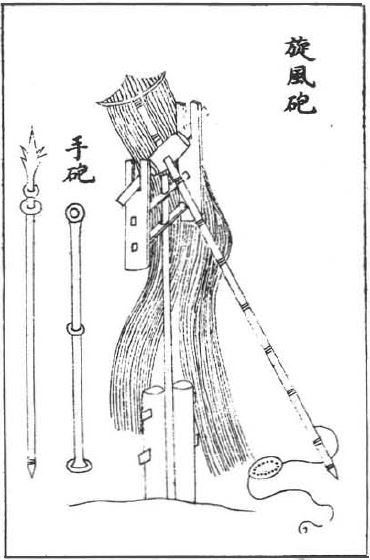
Whirlwind trebuchet

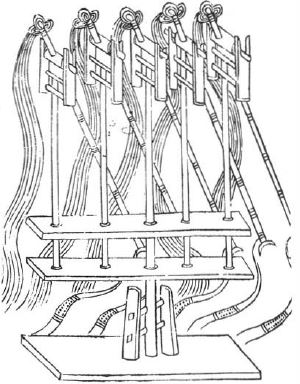
Five whirlwind trebuchets

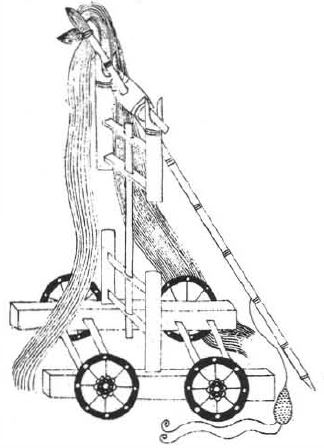
Wheeled whirlwind trebuchet

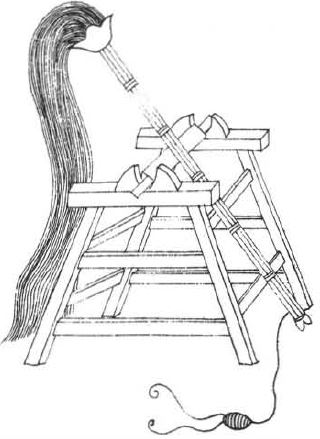
Four footed seven component trebuchet

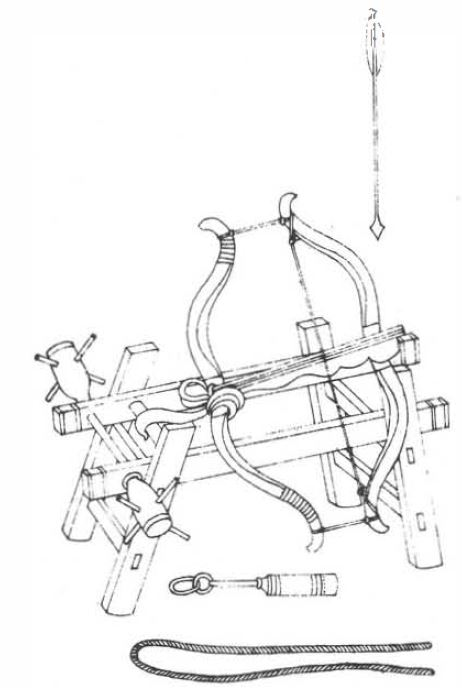
Double bed crossbow

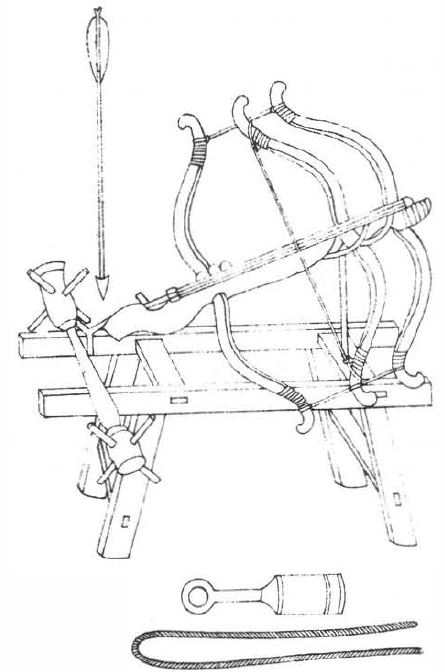
Triple bed crossbow

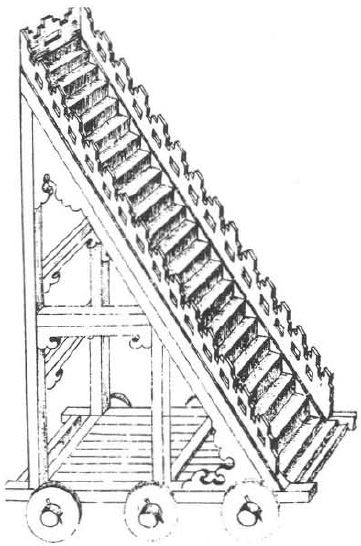
Sky cart

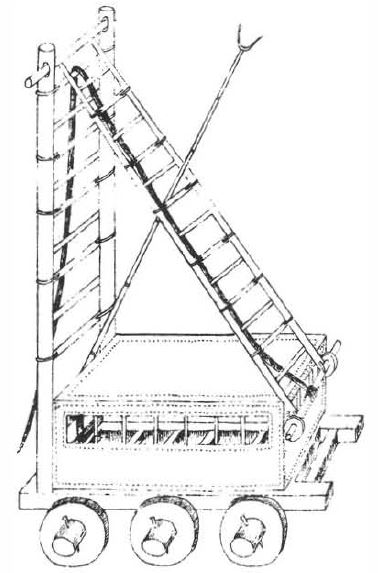
Scaling ladder

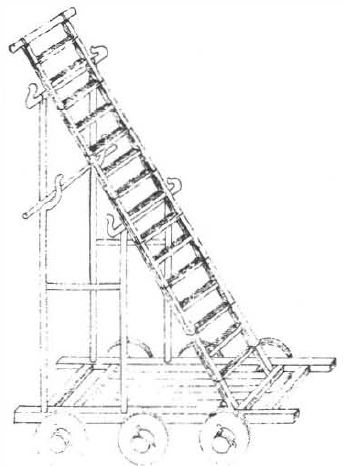
Rake cart

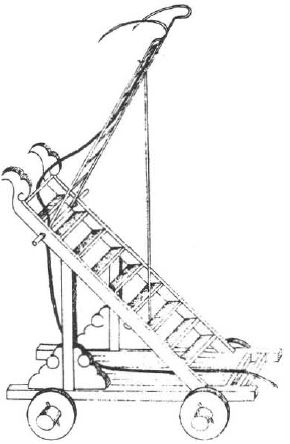
Double hook cart

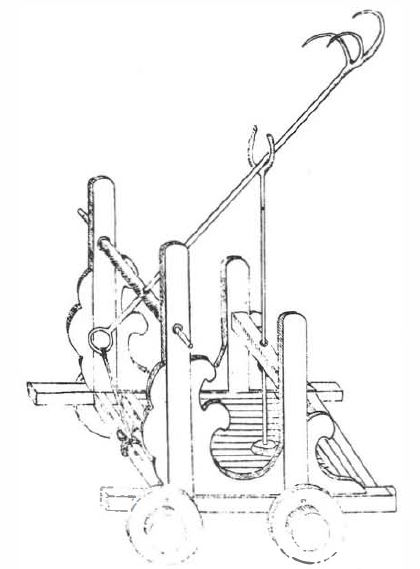
Fork cart

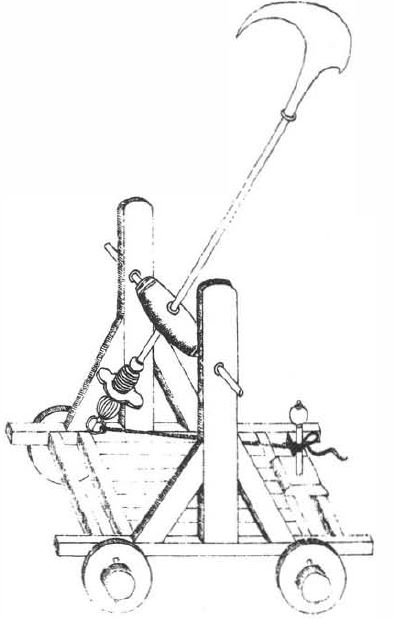
Hungry falcon cart

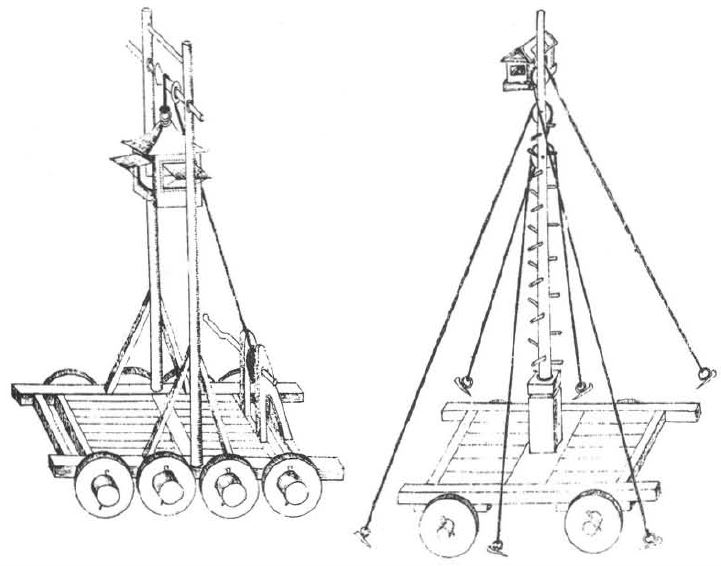
Nest cart and watchtower cart

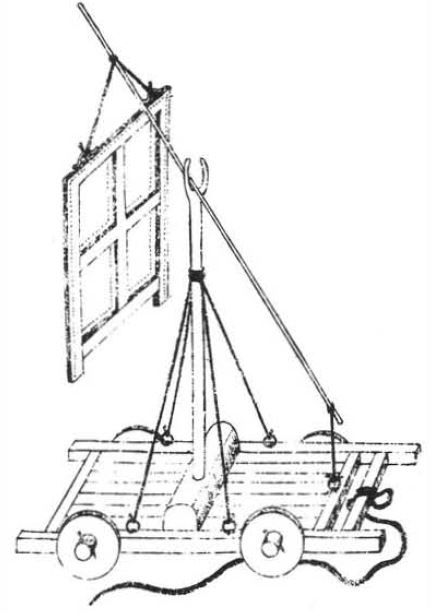
Wooden screen

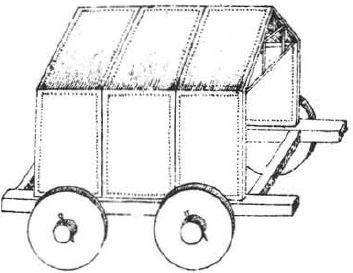
Assault cover

Wooden donkey

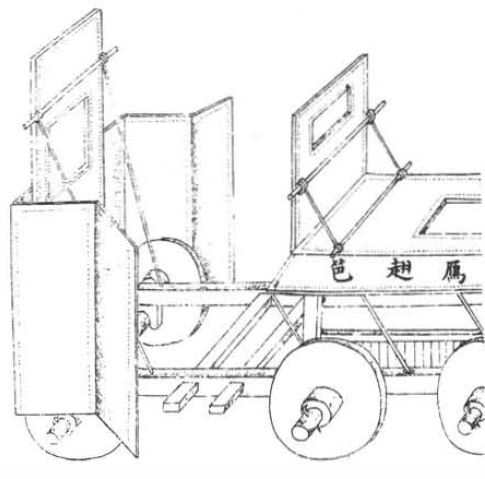
Head cart

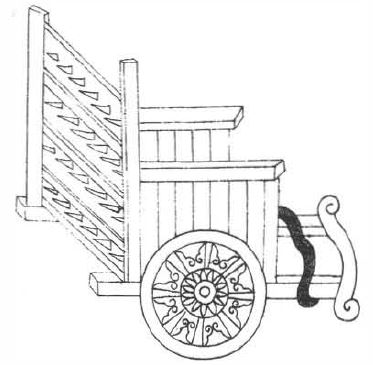
Gate blocking knife cart

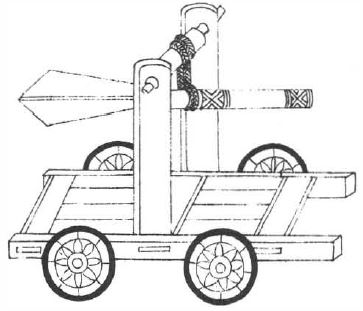
Iron plated ram

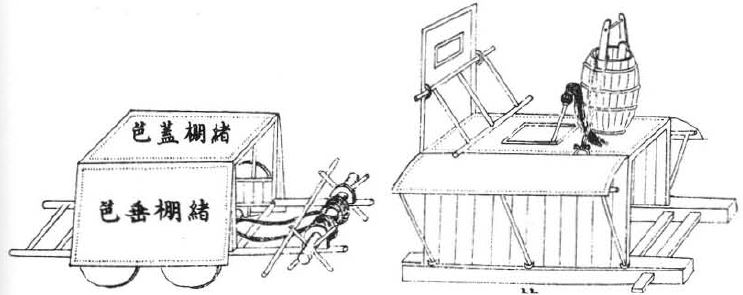
Plated gallery

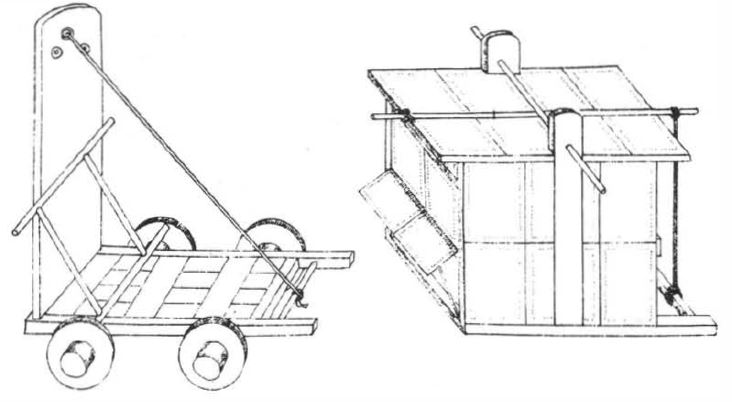
Wagon and cart for filling in moats

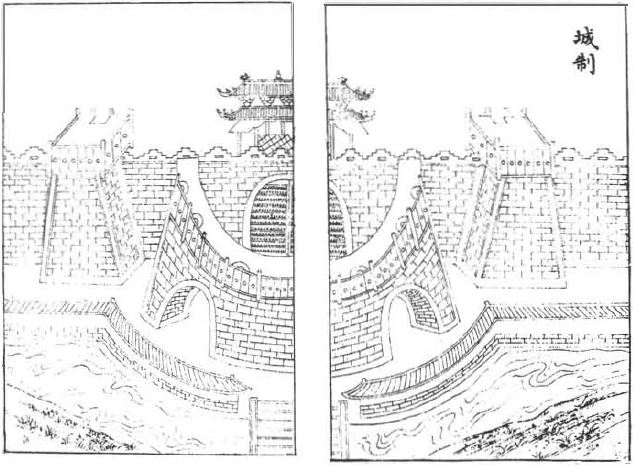
"Sheep horse" wall and barbican

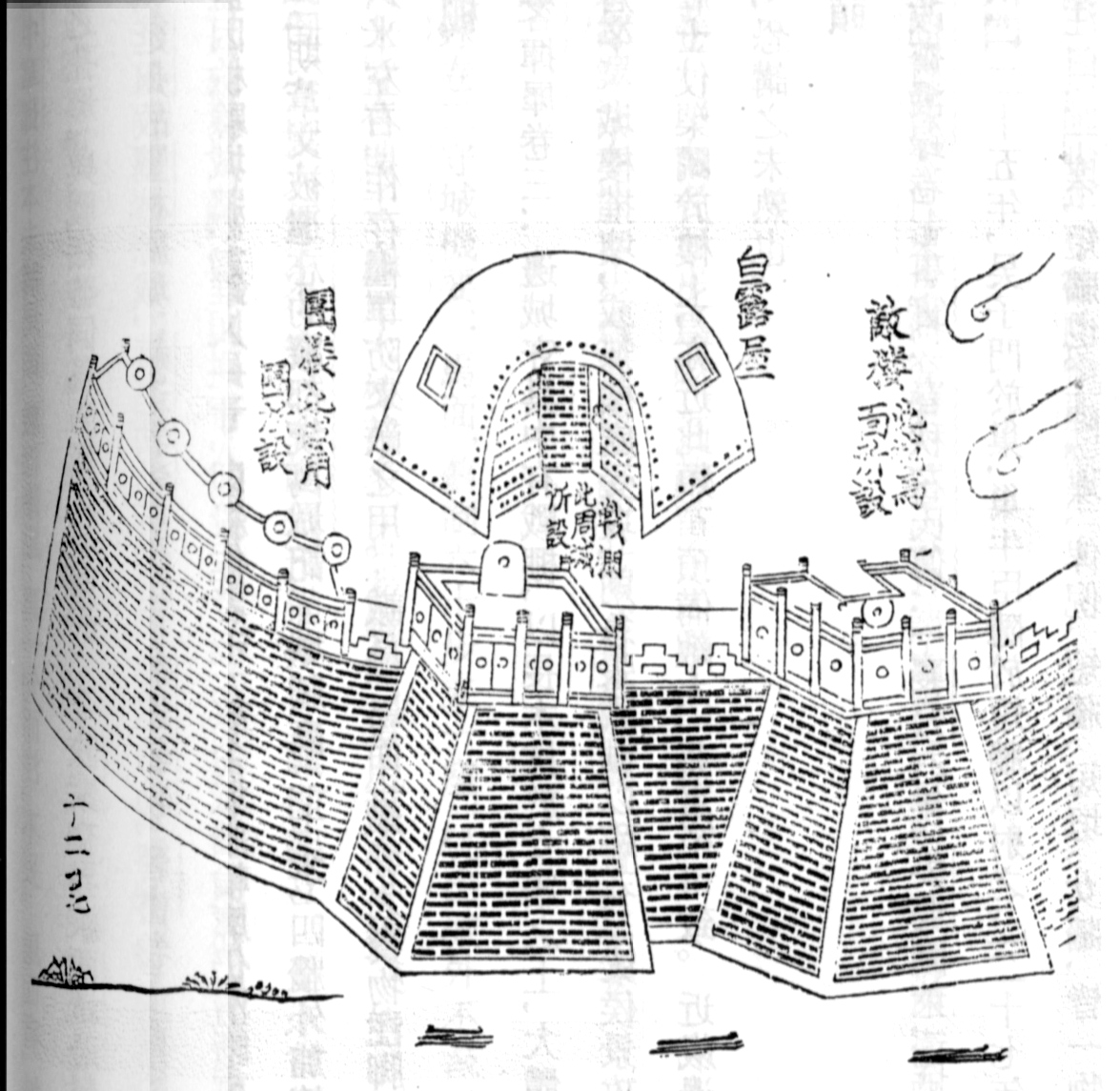
Wall turrets

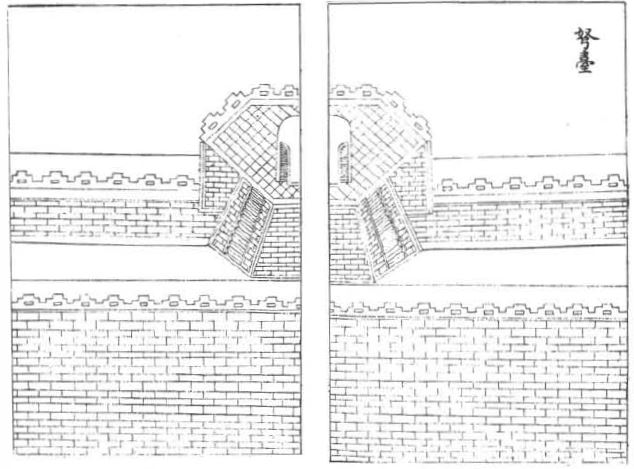
Crossbow platform

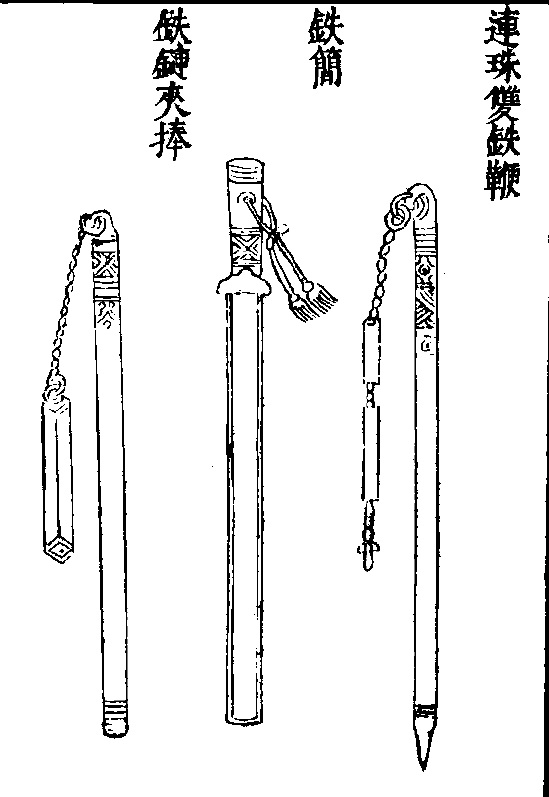
Flails and bar mace

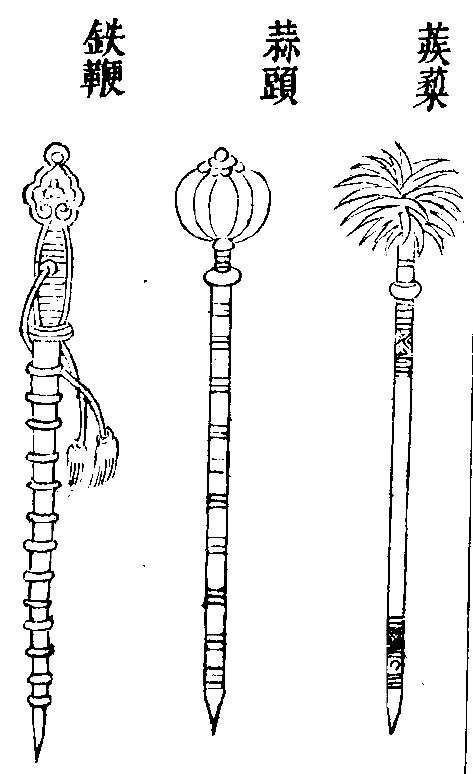
Maces

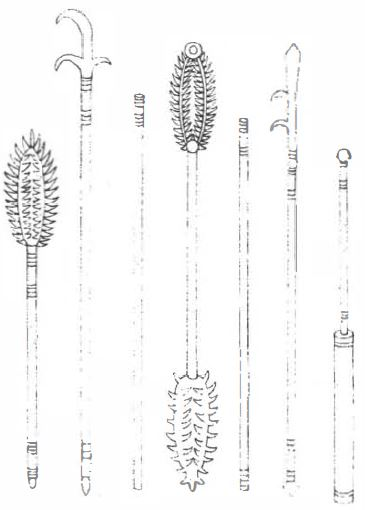
Maces

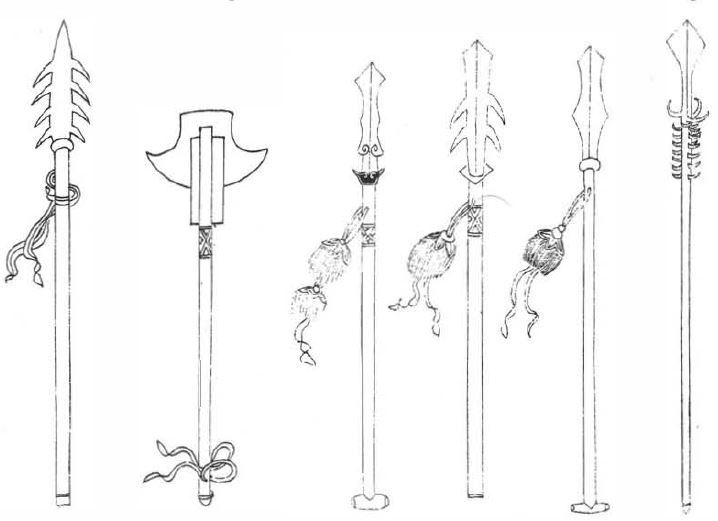
Assorted pole weapons

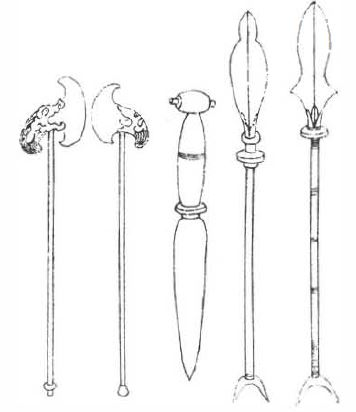
Mining tools

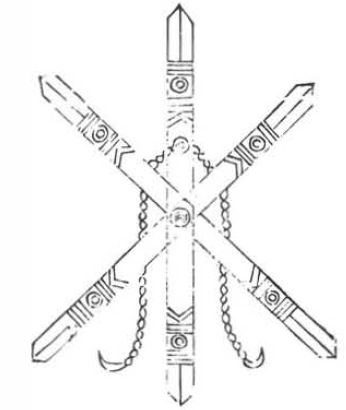
Cheval de frise

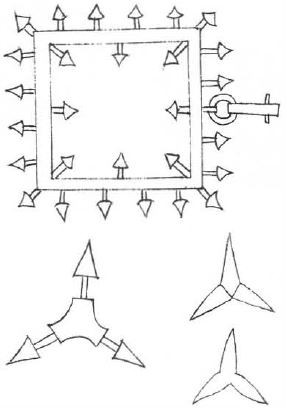
Hoof grasper and iron waterchestnuts

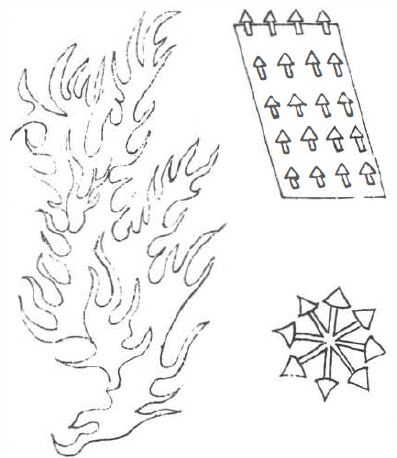
Deerhorn wood, earth stopper, and iron caltrop

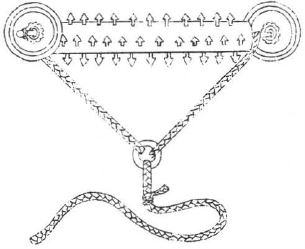
Night prong thunderstick

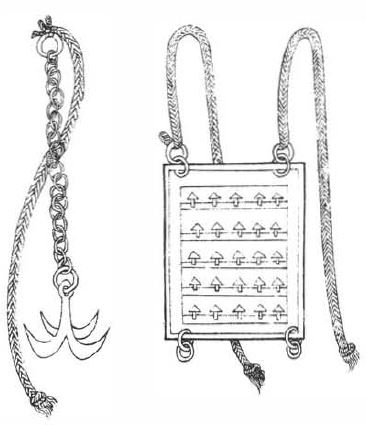
Flying hook and wolf's tooth striking board

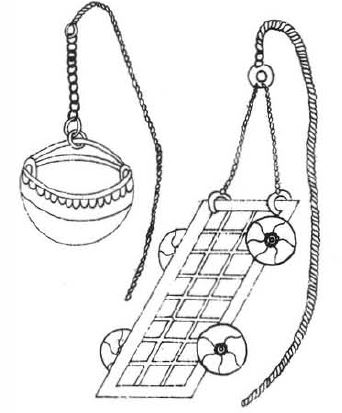
Wandering fire cauldron

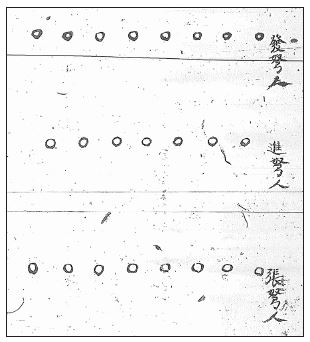
Volley fire diagram showing shooting, advancing, and reloading rows

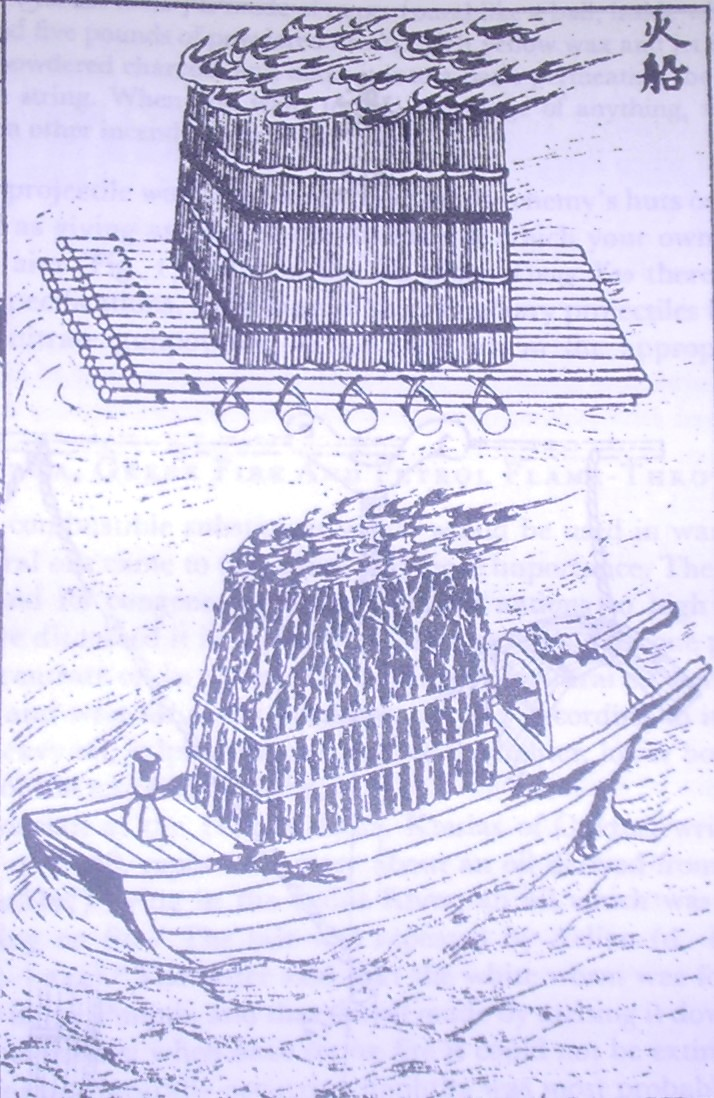
Chinese fire ships from the Wujing Zongyao

== See also ==
- History of the Song dynasty
- Gunpowder warfare
- Technology of the Song dynasty
- Jiao Yu
- Battle of Tangdao
- Battle of Caishi
