= Scrutinyite =

Oxide mineral

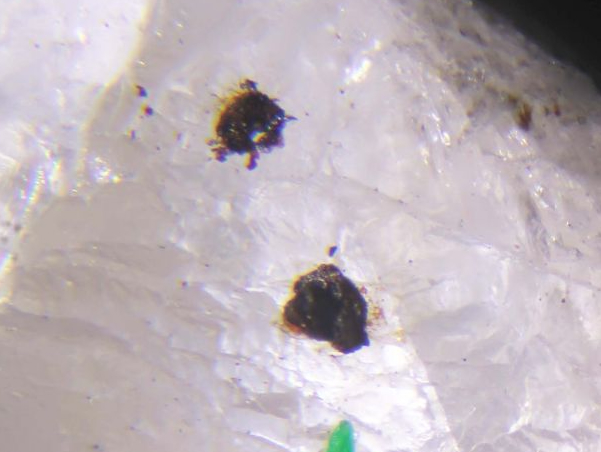

General
- Category: Oxide mineral
- Formula: PbO_{2}
- IMA symbol: Sny
- Strunz classification: 4.DB.20
- Crystal system: Orthorhombic
- Crystal class: Dipyramidal (mmm); H–M Symbol: (2/m 2/m 2/m)
- Space group: Pbcn
- Unit cell: a = 4.91 Å, b = 5.95 Å c = 5.43 Å; Z = 4

Identification
- Formula mass: 239.20 g/mol
- Color: Dark reddish brown
- Crystal habit: Crystalline, platy
- Cleavage: {100} perfect, {010} imperfect
- Fracture: Brittle
- Luster: Sub-metallic
- Streak: Dark brown
- Diaphaneity: Transparent to translucent
- Specific gravity: 9.867 (calculated)
- Optical properties: Biaxial
- Refractive index: n > 2
- Other characteristics: Non-fluorescent, nonmagnetic

Scrutinyite /ˈskruːtɪni.aɪt/ is a rare oxide mineral and is the alpha crystalline form of lead dioxide (α-PbO_{2}), plattnerite being the other, beta form. The mineral was first reported in 1988 and its name reflects the scrutiny and efforts required to identify it from a very limited amount of available sample material.

== Identification ==
The synthetic orthorhombic form of lead dioxide, α-PbO_{2}, was known from 1941. Although natural lead dioxide has been known, as the mineral plattnerite (β-PbO_{2}), since 1845, its alpha form could only be recognized in 1981 and reliably identified in 1988.

The new mineral was spotted in several samples collected at Bingham, New Mexico and Mapimí, Durango, Mexico. It was first thought to be minium (lead tetroxide mineral) because of its high lead content, brown color and association with other lead oxide minerals plattnerite and murdochite. Its holotype specimen consisted of crystalline plates 25–30 micrometers (μm) across and 1–2 μm thick with the total weight below 1 mg. The flakes were collected from a fluorite, quartz, limonite and rosasite matrixes. Identification and characterization of scrutinyite by the standard X-ray diffraction (XRD) technique was hindered by scarcity of material and strong signal interference with plattnerite. The unusual amount of effort required for the analysis resulted in its name derived from the word "scrutiny". The holotype specimen is preserved in the US National Museum (catalog number NMNH 165479).

== Characterization ==
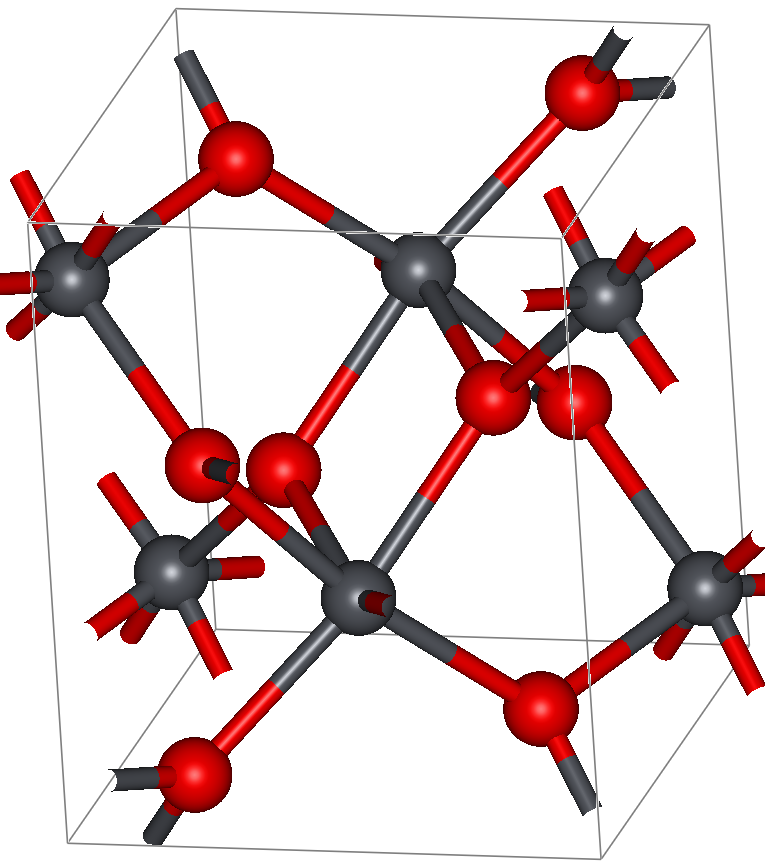
Crystal structure

The PbO_{2} composition of scrutinyite was deduced by energy-dispersive X-ray spectroscopy. Slight oxygen deficiency is generally attributed to the surface effects, especially in thin samples, namely oxygen in the surface layers of PbO_{2} is usually substituted by the hydroxyl groups.

The crystal structure was deduced by XRD as orthorhombic, space group Pbcn (No. 60), Pearson symbol oP12, lattice constants a = 0.497 nm, b = 0.596 nm, c = 0.544 nm, Z = 4 (four formula units per unit cell) were in reasonable agreement with previous results obtained on synthetic samples.
