= Lead dioxide =

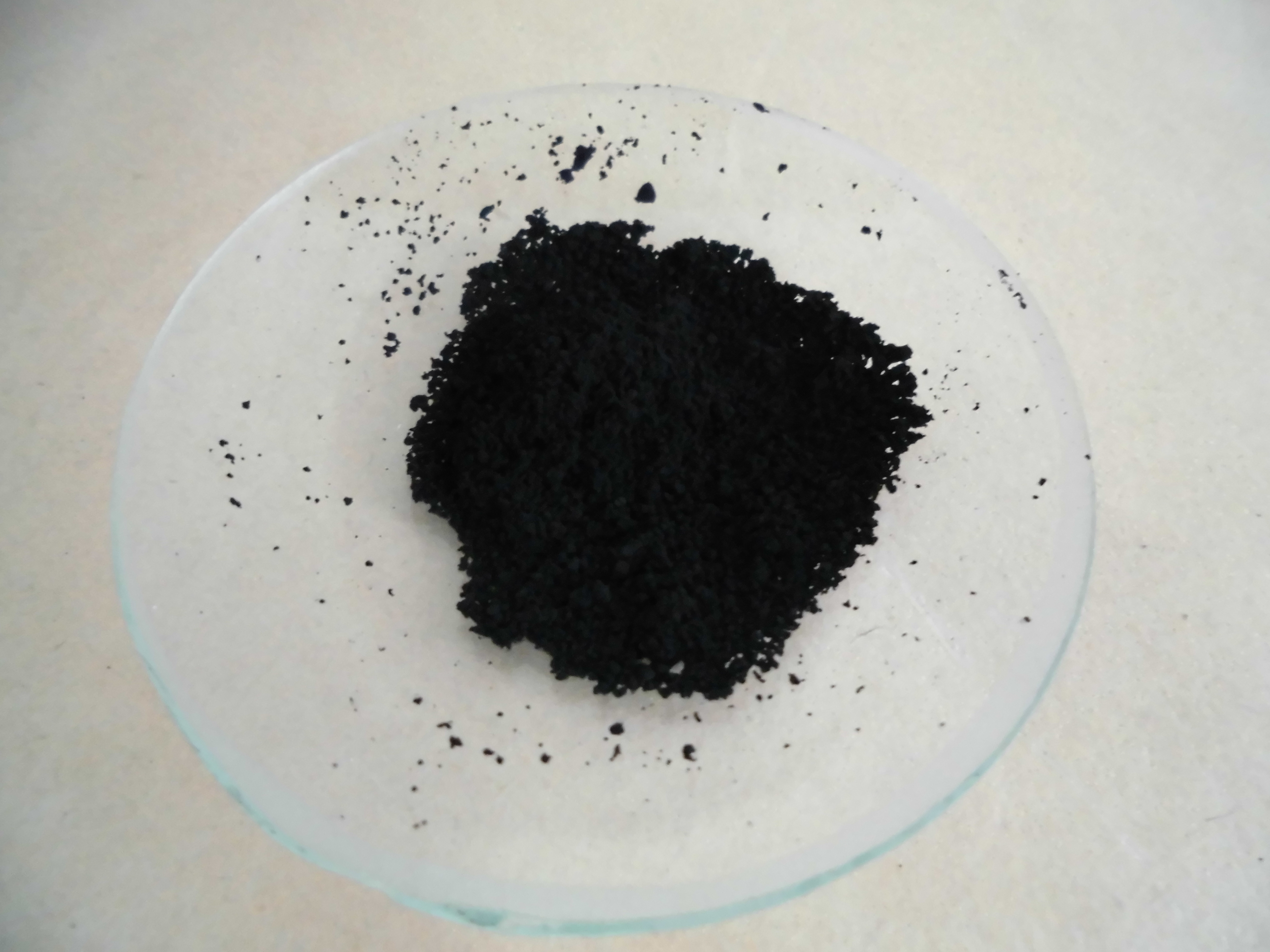
- Sample of lead dioxide

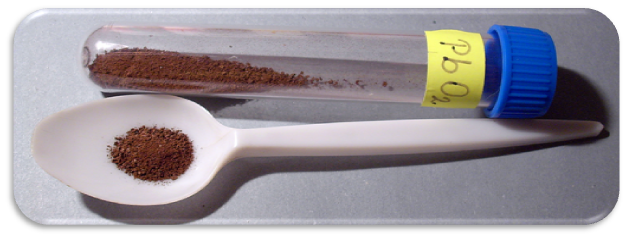
- Sample of lead dioxide

Names
- IUPAC name Lead(IV) oxide
- Other names Plumbic oxide Plattnerite

Identifiers
CAS Number	1309-60-0
3D model (JSmol)	Interactive image
ChemSpider	14109; 11421764
ECHA InfoCard	100.013.795
EC Number	215-174-5
PubChem CID	14793
RTECS number	OGO700000
UNII	7JJD3ICL6A
UN number	1872
CompTox Dashboard (EPA)	DTXSID5025497
- InChI: InChI=1S/2O.Pb Key: YADSGOSSYOOKMP-UHFFFAOYSA-N
- SMILES: O=[Pb]=O

Properties
Chemical formula	PbO_{2}
Molar mass	239.2 g·mol^{−1}
Appearance	dark-brown, black powder
Density	9.38 g/cm^{3}
Melting point	290 °C (554 °F; 563 K) decomposes
Solubility in water	insoluble
Solubility	soluble in acetic acid insoluble in alcohol
Refractive index (n_{D})	2.3

Structure
Crystal structure	hexagonal

Hazards
- GHS labelling
Pictograms	(GHS03: Oxidizing) (GHS07: Exclamation mark) (GHS08: Health hazard) (GHS09: Environmental hazard)
Signal word	Danger
Hazard statements	H272, H302, H332, H360, H372, H373, H410
Precautionary statements	P201, P202, P210, P220, P221, P260, P264, P270, P271, P273, P280, P281, P301+P312, P304+P312, P304+P340, P308+P313, P312, P314, P330, P370+P378, P391, P405, P501
NFPA 704 (fire diamond)	4 0 3 OX
Flash point	Non-flammable
Safety data sheet (SDS)	External MSDS

Related compounds
Other cations	Carbon dioxide Silicon dioxide Germanium dioxide Tin dioxide
Related lead oxides	Lead(II) oxide Lead(II,IV) oxide
Related compounds	Thallium(III) oxide Bismuth(V) oxide
- Except where otherwise noted, data are given for materials in their standard state (at 25 °C [77 °F], 100 kPa). verify (what is ?) Infobox references

Lead(IV) oxide, commonly known as lead dioxide, is an inorganic compound with the chemical formula PbO_{2}. It is an oxide where lead is in an oxidation state of +4. It is a dark-brown or black solid which is insoluble in water and slightly soluble in concentrated nitric and sulfuric acids. It exists in two crystalline forms. It has several important applications in electrochemistry, in particular as the positive plate of lead acid batteries and as a relatively inexpensive anode in electrolysis reactions.

== Properties ==
=== Physical ===
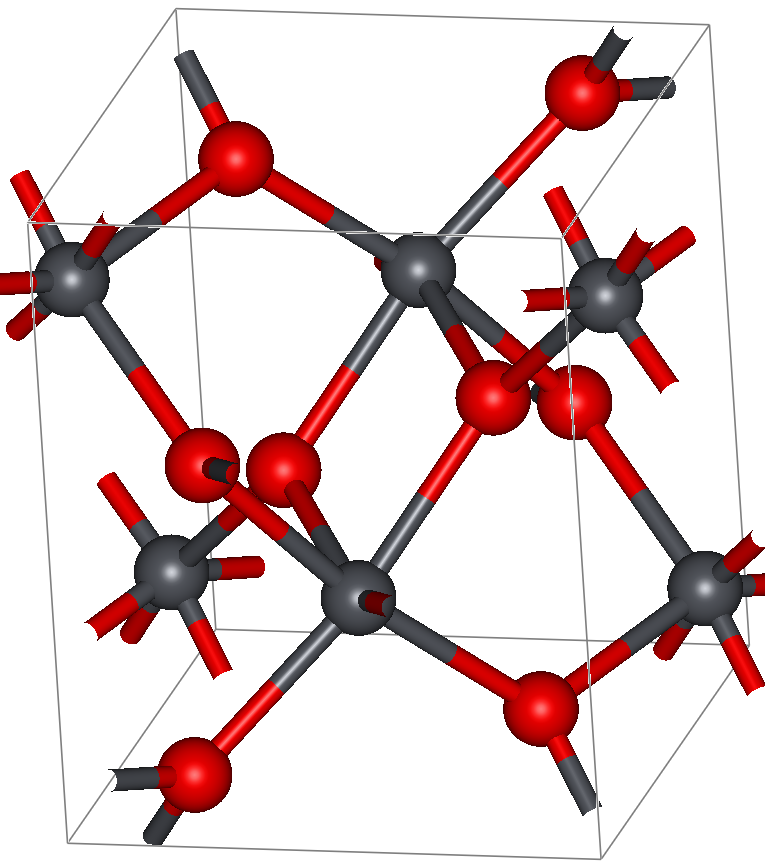
Crystal structure of α-PbO_{2}

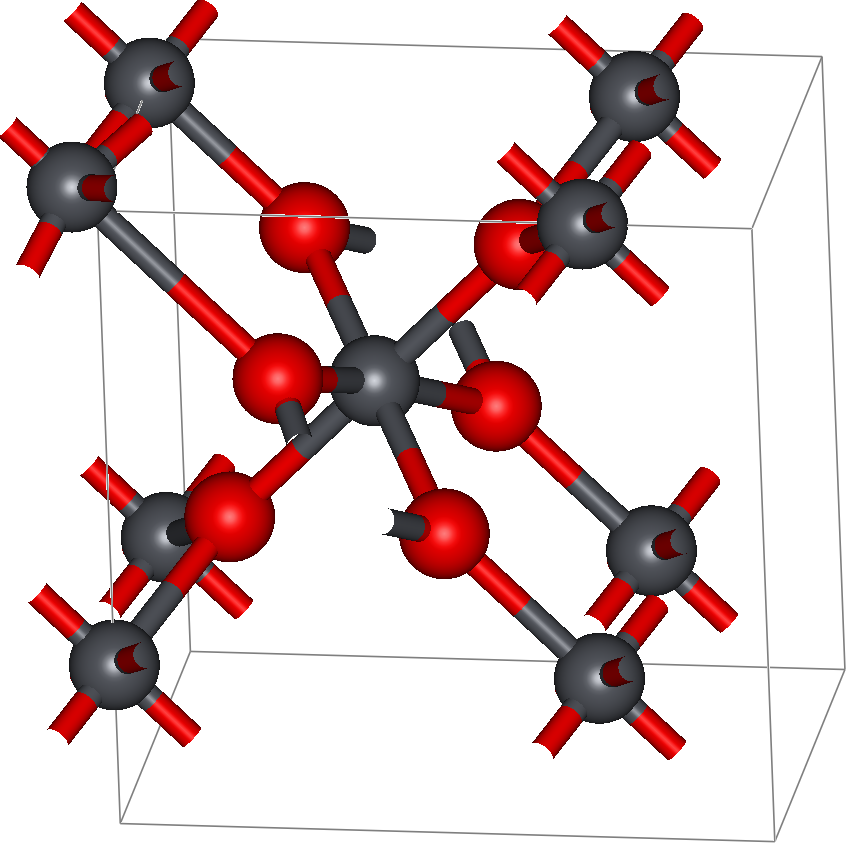
Crystal structure of β-PbO_{2}

Lead dioxide has two major polymorphs, alpha and beta, which occur naturally as rare minerals scrutinyite and plattnerite, respectively. Whereas the beta form had been identified in 1845, α-PbO_{2} was first identified in 1946 and found as a naturally occurring mineral in 1988.

The alpha form has orthorhombic symmetry, space group Pbcn (No. 60), Pearson symbol oP12, lattice constants a = 0.497 nm, b = 0.596 nm, c = 0.544 nm, Z = 4 (four formula units per unit cell). The lead atoms are six-coordinate.

The symmetry of the beta form is tetragonal, space group P4_{2}/mnm (No. 136), Pearson symbol tP6, lattice constants a = 0.491 nm, c = 0.3385 nm, Z = 2 and related to the rutile structure and can be envisaged as containing columns of octahedra sharing opposite edges and joined to other chains by corners. This contrasts with the alpha form where the octahedra are linked by adjacent edges to give zigzag chains.

=== Chemical ===
Lead dioxide decomposes upon heating in air as follows:

24 PbO_{2} → 2 Pb_{12}O_{19} + 5 O_{2}
Pb_{12}O_{19} → Pb_{12}O_{17} + O_{2}
2 Pb_{12}O_{17} → 8 Pb_{3}O_{4} + O_{2}
2 Pb_{3}O_{4} → 6 PbO + O_{2}

The stoichiometry of the end product can be controlled by changing the temperature – for example, in the above reaction, the first step occurs at 290 °C, second at 350 °C, third at 375 °C and fourth at 600 °C. In addition, Pb_{2}O_{3} can be obtained by decomposing PbO_{2} at 580–620 °C under an oxygen pressure of 1,400 atm (140 MPa). Therefore, thermal decomposition of lead dioxide is a common way of producing various lead oxides.

Lead dioxide is an amphoteric compound with prevalent acidic properties. It dissolves in strong bases to form the hydroxyplumbate ion, [Pb(OH)_{6}]^{2−}:

PbO_{2} + 2 NaOH + 2 H_{2}O → Na_{2}[Pb(OH)_{6}]

It also reacts with basic oxides in the melt, yielding orthoplumbates M_{4}[PbO_{4}].

Because of the instability of its Pb^{4+} cation, lead dioxide reacts with hot acids, converting to the more stable Pb^{2+} state and liberating oxygen:

2 PbO_{2} + 2 H_{2}SO_{4} → 2 PbSO_{4} + 2 H_{2}O + O_{2}
2 PbO_{2} + 4 HNO_{3} → 2 Pb(NO_{3})_{2} + 2 H_{2}O + O_{2}
PbO_{2} + 4 HCl → PbCl_{2} + 2 H_{2}O + Cl_{2}

However these reactions are slow.

Lead dioxide is well known for being a good oxidizing agent, with an example reactions listed below:

2 MnSO_{4} + 5 PbO_{2} + 6 HNO_{3} → 2 HMnO_{4} + 2 PbSO_{4} + 3 Pb(NO_{3})_{2} + 2 H_{2}O
2 Cr(OH)_{3} + 10 KOH + 3 PbO_{2} → 2 K_{2}CrO_{4} + 3 K_{2}PbO_{2} + 8 H_{2}O

=== Electrochemical ===
Although the formula of lead dioxide is nominally given as PbO_{2}, the actual oxygen to lead ratio varies between 1.90 and 1.98 depending on the preparation method. Deficiency of oxygen (or excess of lead) results in the characteristic metallic conductivity of lead dioxide, with a resistivity as low as 10^{−4} Ω·cm and which is exploited in various electrochemical applications. Like metals, lead dioxide has a characteristic electrode potential, and in electrolytes it can be polarized both anodically and cathodically. Lead dioxide electrodes have a dual action, that is both the lead and oxygen ions take part in the electrochemical reactions.

== Production ==
=== Chemical processes ===
Lead dioxide is produced commercially by several methods, which include oxidation of red lead (Pb_{3}O_{4}) in alkaline slurry in a chlorine atmosphere, reaction of lead(II) acetate with "chloride of lime" (calcium hypochlorite), The reaction of Pb_{3}O_{4} with nitric acid also affords the dioxide:

Pb_{3}O_{4} + 4 HNO_{3} → PbO_{2} + 2 Pb(NO_{3})_{2} + 2 H_{2}O

PbO_{2} reacts with sodium hydroxide to form the hexahydroxoplumbate(IV) ion [Pb(OH)_{6}]^{2−}, soluble in water.

=== Electrolysis ===
An alternative synthesis method is electrochemical: lead dioxide forms on pure lead, in dilute sulfuric acid, when polarized anodically at electrode potential about +1.5 V at room temperature. This procedure is used for large-scale industrial production of PbO_{2} anodes. Lead and copper electrodes are immersed in sulfuric acid flowing at a rate of 5–10 L/min. The electrodeposition is carried out galvanostatically, by applying a current of about 100 A/m^{2} for about 30 minutes.

The drawback of this method for the production of lead dioxide anodes is its softness, especially compared to the hard and brittle PbO_{2} which has a Mohs hardness of 5.5. This mismatch in mechanical properties results in peeling of the coating which is preferred for bulk PbO_{2} production. Therefore, an alternative method is to use harder substrates, such as titanium, niobium, tantalum or graphite and deposit PbO_{2} onto them from lead(II) nitrate in static or flowing nitric acid. The substrate is usually sand-blasted before the deposition to remove surface oxide and contamination and to increase the surface roughness and adhesion of the coating.

== Applications ==
Lead dioxide is used in the production of matches, pyrotechnics, dyes and the curing of sulfide polymers. It is also used in the construction of high-voltage lightning arresters.

Lead dioxide is used as an anode material in electrochemistry. β-PbO_{2} is more attractive for this purpose than the α form because it has relatively low resistivity, good corrosion resistance even in low-pH medium, and a high overvoltage for the evolution of oxygen in sulfuric- and nitric-acid-based electrolytes. Lead dioxide can also withstand chlorine evolution in hydrochloric acid. Lead dioxide anodes are inexpensive and were once used instead of conventional platinum and graphite electrodes for regenerating potassium dichromate. They were also applied as oxygen anodes for electroplating copper and zinc in sulfate baths. In organic synthesis, lead dioxide anodes were applied for the production of glyoxylic acid from oxalic acid in a sulfuric acid electrolyte.

=== Lead acid battery ===
The most widespread use of lead dioxide is as the positive plate of lead acid batteries. Its utility arises from the anomalous metallic conductivity of PbO_{2}. The battery stores and releases energy by shifting the equilibrium (a comproportionation) between metallic lead, lead dioxide, and lead(II) salts in sulfuric acid.

Pb + PbO_{2} + 2 HSO^{−}_{4} + 2 H^{+} → 2 PbSO_{4} + 2 H_{2}O E° = +2.05 V

=== Pollution monitoring ===
Until the 1970s, lead dioxide was used as an adsorbent for sulphur dioxide in pollution monitoring.

== Safety ==
Lead compounds are poisons.

PbO_{2} is not combustible, but it enhances flammability of other substances and the intensity of the fire. In case of a fire it gives off irritating and toxic fumes.

Lead dioxide is poisonous to aquatic life, but because of its insolubility it usually settles out of water. When a community water supply switched from chlorine to monochloramine as a disinfectant, lead is known to leach from lead service lines (plumbing pipes). Because of its insolubility, lead dioxide serves as a passivation layer lead pipes that convey chlorinated water.
