= Diapalma =

In pharmacology, diapalma (from Lat dia, "made of" + palma, "palm") is a desiccating or drying plaster, named for the wood of the palm tree, from which the spatula is made that is used to stir the mixture while boiling. It was formerly composed of common oil, hogs-fat, and litharge of gold; or also of palm oil, litharge, and zinc sulfate. Now, it is made of white wax, emplastrum simplex, and sulfate of zinc.
