= Plumbite =

In chemistry, plumbite is the PbO^{2−}_{2} oxyanion or hydrated forms, or any salt containing this anion. In these salts, lead is in the oxidation state +2. It is the traditional term for the IUPAC name plumbate(II).

For example, lead(II) oxide (PbO) dissolves in alkali to form salts containing the HPbO^{−}_{2} anion (hydrogen plumbite):

PbO + OH^{−} → HPbO^{−}_{2}

Lead(II) hydroxide also dissolves in excess alkali to form the [Pb(OH)_{6}]^{4−} anion (hexahydroxyplumbate(II)):

Pb(OH)_{2} + 4 OH^{−} → [Pb(OH)_{6}]^{4−}

The plumbite ion is a weak reducing agent. When it functions as one, it is oxidized to the plumbate ion.

== See also ==
- Plumbate
- Lead
- Lead(II) oxide
