= Plattnerite =

Oxide mineral

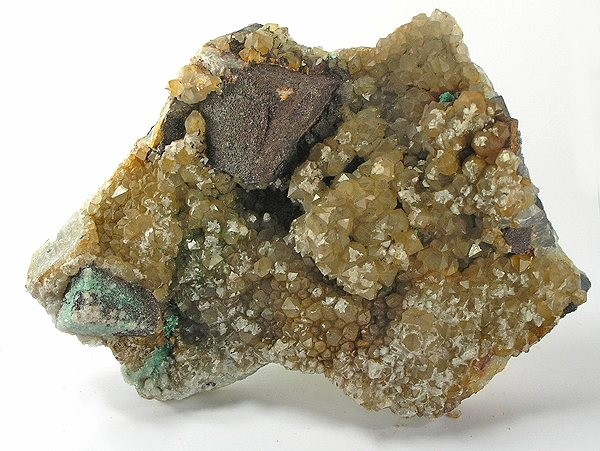
- Quartz and galena sample, plattnerite over the large galena cube.

General
- Category: Oxide minerals
- Formula: PbO_{2}
- IMA symbol: Ptn
- Strunz classification: 4.DB.05
- Crystal system: Tetragonal
- Crystal class: Ditetragonal dipyramidal (4/mmm); H–M Symbol: (4/m 2/m 2/m)
- Space group: P4_{2}/mnm
- Unit cell: a = 4.95 Å, c = 3.38 Å; Z = 2

Identification
- Formula mass: 239.20 g/mol
- Color: Dark brown, iron-black
- Crystal habit: Prismatic crystals, may be nodular or botryoidal, fibrous and concentrically zoned, massive
- Twinning: Contact and penetration twinning on {011}, rarely polysynthetic
- Cleavage: None
- Fracture: Sub-conchoidal, fibrous
- Tenacity: Brittle
- Mohs scale hardness: 5.5
- Luster: Bright metallic to adamantine
- Streak: Chestnut brown
- Diaphaneity: Subtranslucent to opaque
- Specific gravity: 8.5–9.63, average = 9.06
- Optical properties: Uniaxial (-)
- Refractive index: n_{ω}=2.35, n_{ε}=2.25
- Birefringence: δ = 0.1
- Alters to: tarnishes to dull on exposure
- Other characteristics: Non-fluorescent, nonmagnetic

Plattnerite is an oxide mineral and is the beta crystalline form of lead dioxide (β-PbO_{2}), scrutinyite being the other, alpha form. It was first reported in 1845 and named after German mineralogist Karl Friedrich Plattner. Plattnerite forms bundles of dark needle-like crystals on various minerals; the crystals are hard and brittle and have tetragonal symmetry.

== Occurrence ==
Plattnerite is found in numerous arid locations in North America (US and Mexico), most of Europe, Asia (Iran and Russia), Africa (Namibia) and Southern and Western Australia. It occurs in weathered hydrothermal base-metal deposits as hay-like bundles of dark prismatic crystals with a length of a few millimeters; the bundles grow on, or sometimes within various minerals, including cerussite, smithsonite, hemimorphite, leadhillite, hydrozincite, rosasite, aurichalcite, murdochite, limonite, pyromorphite, wulfenite, calcite and quartz.

== Properties and applications ==
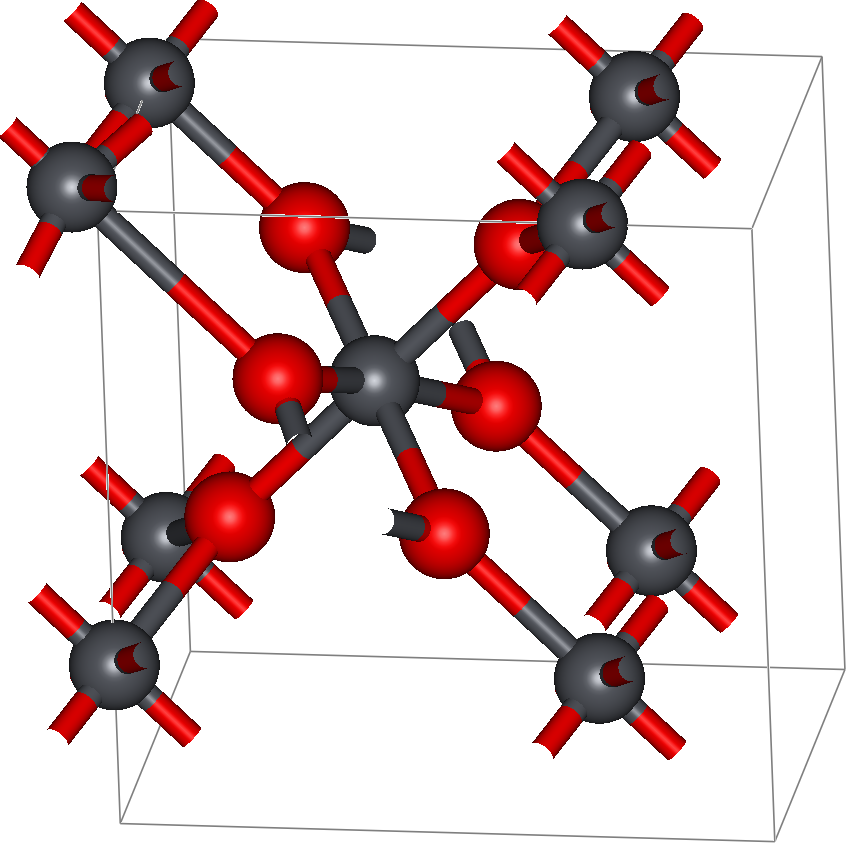
Crystal structure

Basic properties of plattnerite were described in 1845. Already then, the mineral was known under its name, given to honor Karl Friedrich Plattner (1800–1858), professor of metallurgy and assaying at the Mining Academy in Freiberg, Saxony, Germany.

Its crystal structure was refined later on synthetic samples. Plattnerite belongs to the rutile mineral group. It has tetragonal symmetry, space group P4_{2}/mnm (No. 136), Pearson symbol tP6, lattice constants a = 0.491 nm, c = 0.3385 nm, Z = 2 (two formula units per unit cell).

Lead dioxide is used in lead acid batteries and electrochemistry, but only in synthetic form – both plattnerite and scrutinyite are too rare and find no practical application.
