= Pescafresh =

Indian seafood delivery company

Pescafresh is a fresh seafood home delivery service based in Mumbai, India. The Company was started in 2004 by Sangram Sawant.

As of June 2015, Pescafresh operates in 4 cities in India: Mumbai, Hyderabad, Bangalore and Delhi.

== History ==
Pescafresh started delivering fresh seafood in July 2004. It initially delivered in the areas between South Mumbai to Andheri on Western Suburbs to Sion on central suburbs. Since then it has expanded its services and has started delivering across Mumbai and claims to have reached more than 20,000 households across the city through its home delivery services.

In 2015, Pescafresh partnered with Star Bazaar and Tesco to start one of its kind Gourmet seafood counter. The store branded as Pescafresh Gourmet started operations at Star Bazaar Andheri in June 2015. In its Gourmet store Pescafresh offers Fresh Norwegian Pink Salmon and Himalayan Trout to its retail consumers.
