= Massicot =

Lead (II) oxide mineral

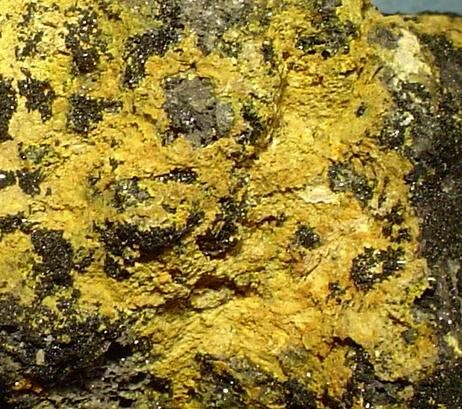
- Massicot from the Monte Cristo mine, Goodsprings District, Clark County, Nevada (size: 5.0 x 4.0 x 4.0 cm)

General
- Category: Oxide mineral
- Formula: PbO
- IMA symbol: Msi
- Strunz classification: 4.AC.25
- Crystal system: Orthorhombic
- Crystal class: Dipyramidal (mmm); H-M symbol: (2/m 2/m 2/m)
- Space group: Pbcm
- Unit cell: a = 5.4903 Å, b = 5.892 Å, c = 4.752 Å; Z = 4

Identification
- Color: Yellow may have a red tint
- Crystal habit: Scaly as incrustations, massive
- Cleavage: Distinct on {100} and {010}
- Fracture: Flexible
- Mohs scale hardness: 2
- Luster: Greasy to dull
- Streak: Yellow
- Diaphaneity: Translucent
- Specific gravity: 9.642 calculated
- Optical properties: Biaxial (+)
- Refractive index: n_{α} = 2.510 n_{β} = 2.610 n_{γ} = 2.710
- Birefringence: δ = 0.200
- Pleochroism: Y = light sulfur-yellow; Z = deep yellow
- 2V angle: Measured: 90°, calculated: 86°
- Dispersion: Strong

Massicot is a lead (II) oxide mineral with an orthorhombic lattice structure. Lead(II) oxide (formula: PbO) can occur in one of two lattice formats, orthorhombic and tetragonal. The red tetragonal form is called litharge. PbO can be changed from massicot to litharge (or vice versa) by controlled heating and cooling. At room temperature massicot forms soft (Mohs hardness of 2) yellow to reddish-yellow, earthy, scaley masses which are very dense, with a specific gravity of 9.64. Massicot can be found as a natural mineral, though it is only found in minor quantities. In bygone centuries it was mined. Nowadays massicot arises during industrial processing of lead and lead oxides, especially in the glass industry, which is the biggest user of PbO.

The definition of massicot as orthorhombic PbO dates from the 1840s, but the substance massicot and the name massicot has been in use since the late medieval era. There is some evidence that the ancient Romans used the substance.

It may occur as an oxidation product of other lead-bearing minerals such as galena, bournonite, boulangerite, either naturally or in industrial processing. When massicot is found in a natural environment, some other minerals that may be found with it may include cerussite, litharge, minium, wulfenite, valentinite and limonite.
