= Bismuth pentoxide =

Chemical compound

Identifiers
3D model (JSmol)	Interactive image
- InChI: InChI=1S/2Bi.2H2O.4O/h;;2*1H2;;;;/q2*+1;;;;;;/p-2 Key: GJPFATGNIGMRBH-UHFFFAOYSA-L
- SMILES: O[Bi](=O)(O1)O[Bi]1(=O)O

Properties
Chemical formula	Bi_{2}O_{5}
Appearance	Powder
- Except where otherwise noted, data are given for materials in their standard state (at 25 °C [77 °F], 100 kPa). Infobox references

Bismuth pentoxide is a chemical compound composed of bismuth and oxygen, with the chemical formula Bi_{2}O_{5}. It is a dark red powder decomposing above 100 °C. It is not known as a pure substance, but is usually mixed with water, bismuth tetroxide or bismuth trioxide.

An uncharacterized chocolate-brown or orange powder is produced by boiling salts of bismuthate(V) (e.g. NaBiO_{3}) in nitric acid. The color of the resulting product is dependent on the specific bismuthate used, and it is possibly a mix of residual bismuthate, bismuth pentoxide, and bismuth tetroxide.
