= Minium (mineral) =

Mineral form of lead tetroxide

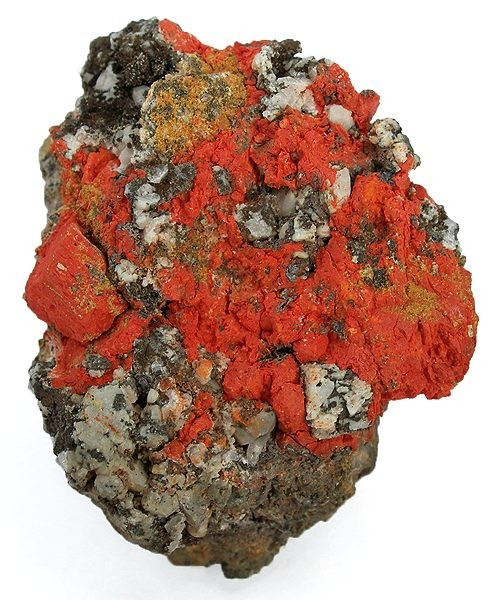
- Minium druse on cerussite from the Old Yuma Mine, Tucson Mountains, Arizona

General
- Category: Oxide mineral
- Formula: Pb^{2+}_{2}Pb^{4+}O_{4}
- Strunz classification: 4.BD.05
- Dana classification: 07.02.08.01
- Crystal system: Tetragonal
- Crystal class: Ditetragonal dipyramidal (4/mmm); H-M symbol: (4/m 2/m 2/m)
- Space group: P4_{2}/mbc
- Unit cell: a = 8.811(5) Å, c = 6.563(3) Å; Z = 4

Identification
- Color: Scarlet to brownish red, may have a yellowish tint
- Crystal habit: Scaly; commonly as earthy, pulverulent masses
- Cleavage: Perfect on {110} and {010}
- Mohs scale hardness: 2.5
- Luster: Dull to slightly greasy
- Streak: Yellow-orange
- Diaphaneity: Semitransparent
- Specific gravity: 8.9 - 9.2
- Optical properties: Uniaxial
- Refractive index: n = 2.42

Minium is the naturally occurring form of lead tetroxide, Pb^{2+}_{2}Pb^{4+}O_{4}, also known as red lead. Minium is a light-to-vivid red and may have brown-to-yellow tints. It typically occurs in scaly-to-earthy masses. It crystallizes in the tetragonal crystal system.

Minium is rare and occurs in lead-mineral deposits that have been subjected to severe oxidizing conditions. It also occurs as a result of mine fires. It is associated with cerussite, galena, litharge, massicot, mimetite, native lead, and wulfenite.

It occurs in relatively small amounts throughout the world: Langhecke, Hesse; Badenweiler, Baden-Württemberg; Bleialf, Eifel district; Horhausen (Grube Holzappel), Rhineland-Palatinate in Germany. It occurs at Mies, Slovenia; Leadhills, Lanarkshire, Scotland; Castelberg St. Avold, Moselle, France; from Langban, Varmland, Sweden; Sarrabus, Sardinia, Italy; near Anarak, Iran; and Tsumeb, Namibia. In the US, mines include the Jay Gould mine, Alturas County, Idaho; the Leadville district, Lake County, Colorado; and in the Tonopah-Belmont mine, Maricopa County, Arizona. It also occurs in Eschuchapa and Guerrero, Mexico. Good specimens were produced by a mine fire at the Broken Hill mine in New South Wales, Australia.

Minium has been identified as one of the pigments at Angkor Wat in Cambodia.

Minium was named for the Iberian river known to the imperial Romans as Minius, now known as the Spanish Miño and the Portuguese Minho. The name was originally applied to certain forms of cinnabar that had been coated with the minium oxide; however, once the red lead contaminant was determined to be chemically distinct from cinnabar crystals, the name minium was applied.

For properties and uses of minium, see lead tetroxide.
