= Plumbate =

Salt having one of the several lead-containing oxoanions

In chemistry, a plumbate often refers to compounds that can be viewed as derivatives of the PbO_{3}^{2−} anion.

== Examples ==
=== Halides ===
Salts of ([PbI_{3}]^{−})_{n}, [Pb_{6}I_{16}]^{4−}, [Pb_{18}I_{44}]^{8−}, etc. are labeled as iodoplumbates. Lead perovskite semiconductors are often described as plumbates.

=== Lead oxyanions ===
Plumbates are formed by the reaction of lead(IV) oxide, PbO_{2}, with alkali. Plumbate salts contain either the hydrated hexahydroxoplumbate(IV) or plumbate anion [Pb(OH)_{6}]^{2−}, or the anhydrous anions PbO_{3}^{2−} (metaplumbate) or PbO_{4}^{4−} (orthoplumbate). For example, dissolving PbO_{2} in a hot, concentrated aqueous solution of potassium hydroxide forms the potassium hexahydroxoplumbate(IV) salt K_{2}[Pb(OH)_{6}]. The anhydrous salts may be synthesized by heating metal oxides or hydroxides with PbO_{2}.

The most widely discussed plumbates are derivatives of barium metaplumbate BaPbO_{3}. When doped with some bismuth in place of lead, the material BaPb_{0.95}Bi_{0.05}O_{3} exhibits superconductivity at 13 K. At the time of this discovery, oxides did not show such properties. The surprise associated with this work was eclipsed by the advent of the cuprate superconductors.

=== Binary lead oxides ===
Lead tetroxide ("red lead"), a valence-mixed oxide with formula Pb_{3}O_{4} (red), may be thought of as lead(II) orthoplumbate(IV), [Pb^{2+}]_{2}[PbO_{4}^{4−}]. Lead sesquioxide, Pb_{2}O_{3}, is also known (reddish yellow), and has the structure of lead(II) metaplumbate(IV), [Pb^{2+}][PbO_{3}^{2−}].
