= Litharge =

Natural mineral form of lead(II) oxide

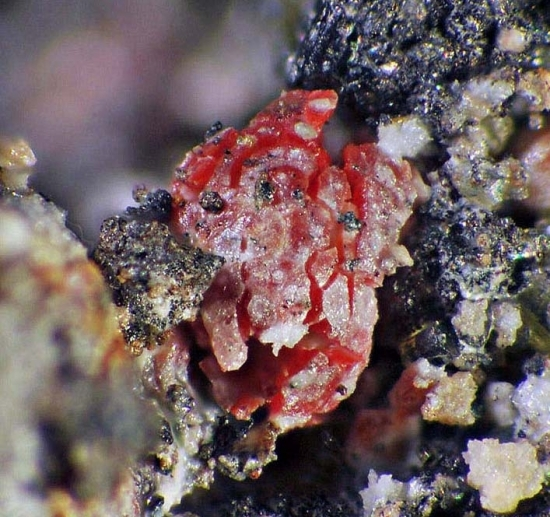

General
- Category: Oxide minerals
- Formula: PbO
- IMA symbol: Lit
- Strunz classification: 4.AC.20
- Crystal system: Tetragonal
- Crystal class: Ditetragonal dipyramidal (4/mmm); H-M symbol: (4/m 2/m 2/m)
- Space group: P4/nmm

Identification
- Color: red
- Cleavage: Distinct/Good. On {110}
- Mohs scale hardness: 2
- Luster: greasy, dull
- Diaphaneity: transparent

Litharge (from Greek lithargyros, lithos 'stone' + argyros 'silver' λιθάργυρος) is one of the natural mineral forms of lead(II) oxide, PbO. Litharge is a secondary mineral which forms from the oxidation of galena ores. It forms as coatings and encrustations with internal tetragonal crystal structure. It is dimorphous with the yellow orthorhombic form massicot. It forms soft (Mohs hardness of 2), red, greasy-appearing crusts with a very high specific gravity of 9.14–9.35. PbO may be prepared by heating lead metal in air at approximately 600 °C (lead melts at only 300 °C). At this temperature it is also the end product of heating of other lead oxides in air. This is often done with a set of bellows pumping air over molten lead and causing the oxidized product to slip or fall off the top into a receptacle, where it quickly solidifies in minute scales.

PbO_{2} –(293 °C)→ Pb_{12}O_{19} –(351 °C)→ Pb_{12}O_{17} –(375 °C)→ Pb_{3}O_{4} –(605 °C)→ PbO

== Historical terminology ==
Historically, the term litharge has been combined to refer to other similar substances. For example, litharge of gold is litharge mixed with red lead, giving it a red color; litharge of bismuth is a similar result of the oxidation of bismuth; and litharge of silver is litharge that comes as a by-product of separating silver from lead. In fact, litharge originally meant the mineral residue from silver refining. The term has also been used as a synonym for white lead or red lead.

== Litharge smelting ==
According to Probert, "silver ore, litharge (crude lead oxide) flux and charcoal were mixed and smelted in very small clay and stone furnaces. Resulting silver-bearing lead bullion was later refined in a second furnace which yielded fine silver, and litharge skimmings which were used again."
