= Lead(II,IV) oxide =

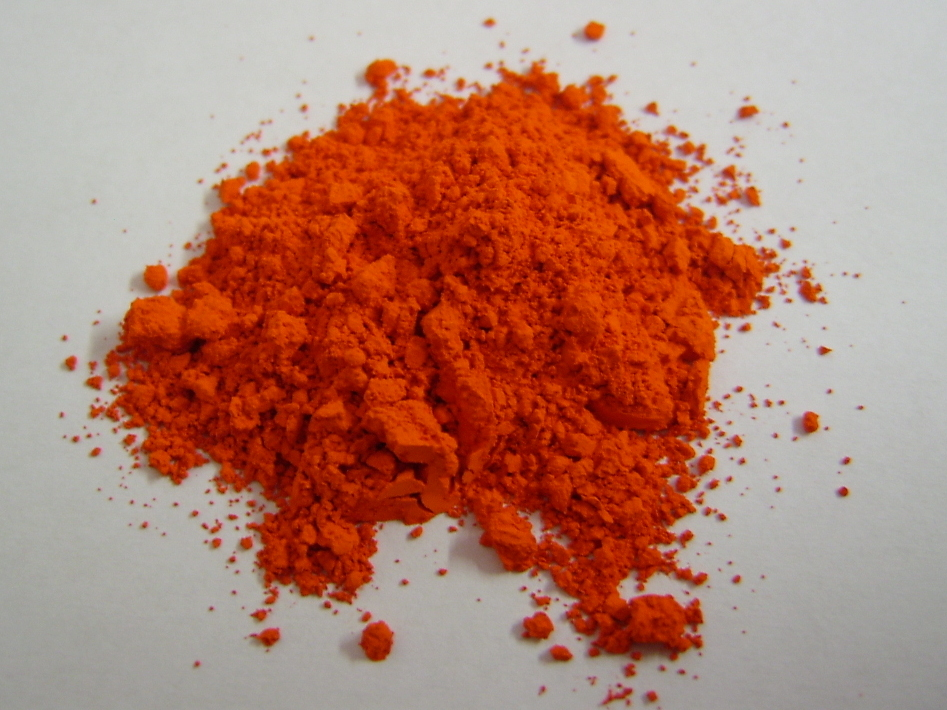
- Sample of pulverised lead(III,IV) oxide

Names
- Preferred IUPAC name Lead tetroxide
- Other names: Minium; Red lead; Triplumbic tetroxide

Identifiers
CAS Number	1314-41-6
3D model (JSmol)	Interactive image
ChemSpider	21169908
ECHA InfoCard	100.013.851
EC Number	215-235-6
PubChem CID	16685188
UNII	A4G39L7HN2
UN number	1479
CompTox Dashboard (EPA)	DTXSID5029637
- InChI: InChI=1S/4O.3Pb Key: XMFOQHDPRMAJNU-UHFFFAOYSA-N
- SMILES: O1[Pb]O[Pb]11O[Pb]O1

Properties
Chemical formula	Pb_{3}O_{4}
Molar mass	685.6 g·mol^{−1}
Appearance	Vivid orange crystals
Density	8.3 g/cm^{3}
Melting point	500 °C (932 °F; 773 K) decomposes
Vapor pressure	1.3 kPa (9.8 mmHg) (at 0 °C (32 °F))

Structure
Crystal structure	Tetragonal, tP28
Space group	P4_{2}/mbc, No. 135

Hazards
- GHS labelling
Pictograms	(GHS07: Exclamation mark) (GHS08: Health hazard) (GHS09: Environmental hazard)
Signal word	Danger
Hazard statements	H272, H302, H332, H360, H373, H410
Precautionary statements	P201, P220, P273, P308+P313, P501
NFPA 704 (fire diamond)	3 0 0

Related compounds
Related lead oxides	Lead(II) oxide; Lead(IV) oxide
- Except where otherwise noted, data are given for materials in their standard state (at 25 °C [77 °F], 100 kPa). verify (what is ?) Infobox references

Lead(II,IV) oxide, also called red lead, lead tetroxide, or minium, is the inorganic compound with the formula Pb_{3}O_{4}. A bright red or orange solid, it is used as pigment, in the manufacture of batteries, and in rustproof primer paints. It is an example of a mixed-valence compound, being composed of both Pb(II) and Pb(IV) in the ratio of 2:1.

== Structure ==
Lead(II,IV) oxide is lead(II) orthoplumbate(IV), [Pb^{2+}]_{2}[PbO^{4−}_{4}]. It has a tetragonal crystal structure at room temperature, which then transforms to an orthorhombic (Pearson symbol oP28, Space group Pbam, No.55) form at temperature 170 K (−103 °C). This phase transition only changes the symmetry of the crystal and slightly modifies the interatomic distances and angles.

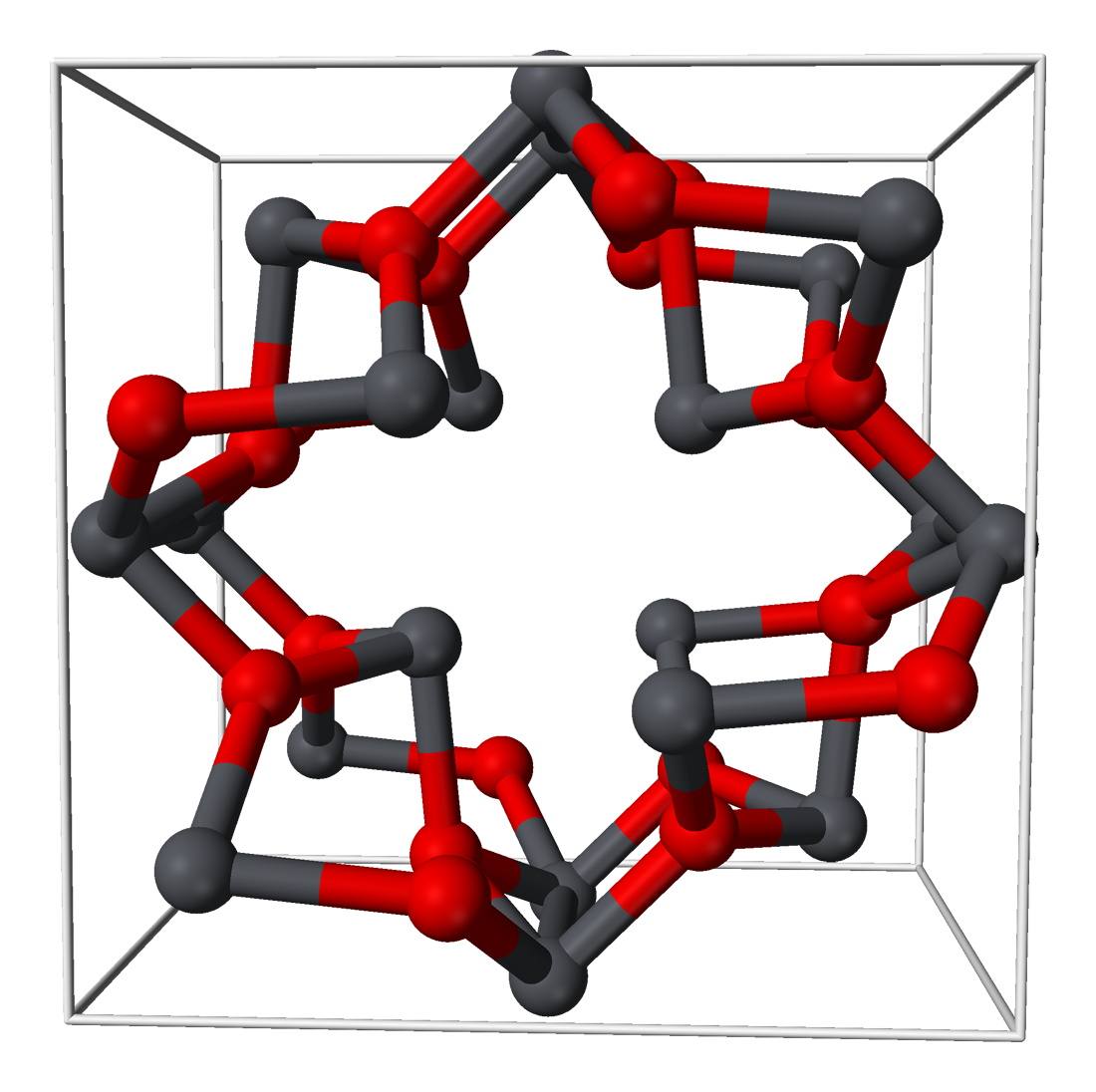
Unit cell of tetragonal Pb_{3}O_{4}
(Key: Pb O)

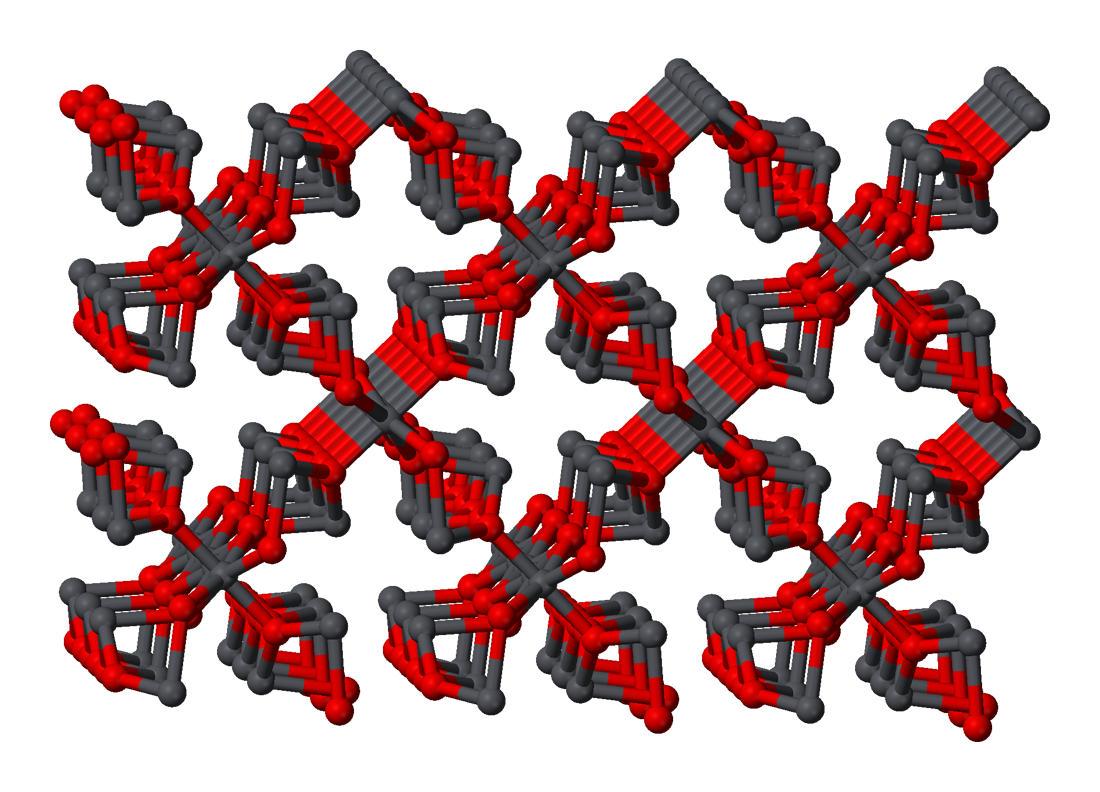
Part of tetragonal red lead's crystal structure

== Preparation ==
Lead(II,IV) oxide is prepared by calcination of lead(II) oxide (PbO; also called litharge) in air at about 450–480 °C (842–896 °F):

6 PbO + O_{2} → 2 Pb_{3}O_{4}

The resulting material is contaminated with PbO. If a pure compound is desired, PbO can be removed by a potassium hydroxide solution:

PbO + KOH + H_{2}O → K[Pb(OH)_{3}]

Another method of preparation relies on annealing of lead(II) carbonate (cerussite) in air:

6 PbCO_{3} + O_{2} → 2 Pb_{3}O_{4} + 6 CO_{2}

Yet another method is oxidative annealing of white lead:

3 Pb_{2}CO_{3}(OH)_{2} + O_{2} → 2 Pb_{3}O_{4} + 3 CO_{2} + 3 H_{2}O

In solution, lead(II,IV) oxide can be prepared by reaction of potassium plumbate with lead(II) acetate, yielding yellow insoluble lead(II,IV) oxide monohydrate, Pb_{3}O_{4}·H_{2}O, which can be turned into the anhydrous form by gentle heating:

K_{2}PbO_{3} + 2 Pb(OCOCH_{3})_{2} + H_{2}O → Pb_{3}O_{4} + 2 KOCOCH_{3} + 2 CH_{3}COOH

Natural minium is uncommon, forming only in extreme oxidizing conditions of lead ore bodies. The best known natural specimens come from Broken Hill, New South Wales, Australia, where they formed as the result of a mine fire.

== Reactions ==
Red lead is virtually insoluble in water and in ethanol. However, it is soluble in hydrochloric acid present in the stomach, and is therefore toxic when ingested. It also dissolves in glacial acetic acid and a diluted mixture of nitric acid and hydrogen peroxide.

When heated to 500 °C (932 °F), it decomposes to lead(II) oxide and oxygen. At 580 °C (1,076 °F), the reaction is complete.

2 Pb_{3}O_{4} → 6 PbO + O_{2}

Nitric acid dissolves the lead(II) oxide component, leaving behind the insoluble lead(IV) oxide:

Pb_{3}O_{4} + 4 HNO_{3} → PbO_{2} + 2 Pb(NO_{3})_{2} + 2 H_{2}O

With iron oxides and with elemental iron, lead(II,IV) oxide forms insoluble iron(II) and iron(III) plumbates, which is the basis of the anti-corrosive properties of lead-based paints applied to iron objects.

== Use ==
Red lead has been used as a pigment for primer paints for iron objects. Due to its toxicity, its use is being limited. It finds limited use in some amateur pyrotechnics as a delay charge and was used in the past in the manufacture of the dragon's egg effect (crackling microstars or star cores).

Red lead is used as a curing agent in some polychloroprene rubber compounds. It is used in place of magnesium oxide to provide better water resistance properties.

Red lead was used for engineer's scraping, before being supplanted by engineer's blue, although red lead still offers more accurate markings since it does not flow as readily as engineer's blue under pressure.

It is also used as an adulterating agent in turmeric powder.

== Physiological effects ==
When inhaled, lead(II,IV) oxide irritates the lungs. In case of high dose, the victim experiences a metallic taste, chest pain, and abdominal pain. When ingested, it is dissolved in the gastric acid and absorbed, leading to lead poisoning. High concentrations can be absorbed through skin as well, and it is important to follow safety precautions when working with lead-based paint.

Long-term contact with lead(II,IV) oxide may lead to accumulation of lead compounds in organisms, with development of symptoms of acute lead poisoning. Chronic poisoning displays as agitation, irritability, vision disorders, hypertension, and a grayish facial hue.

Lead(II,IV) oxide was shown to be carcinogenic for laboratory animals. Its carcinogenicity for humans was not proven.

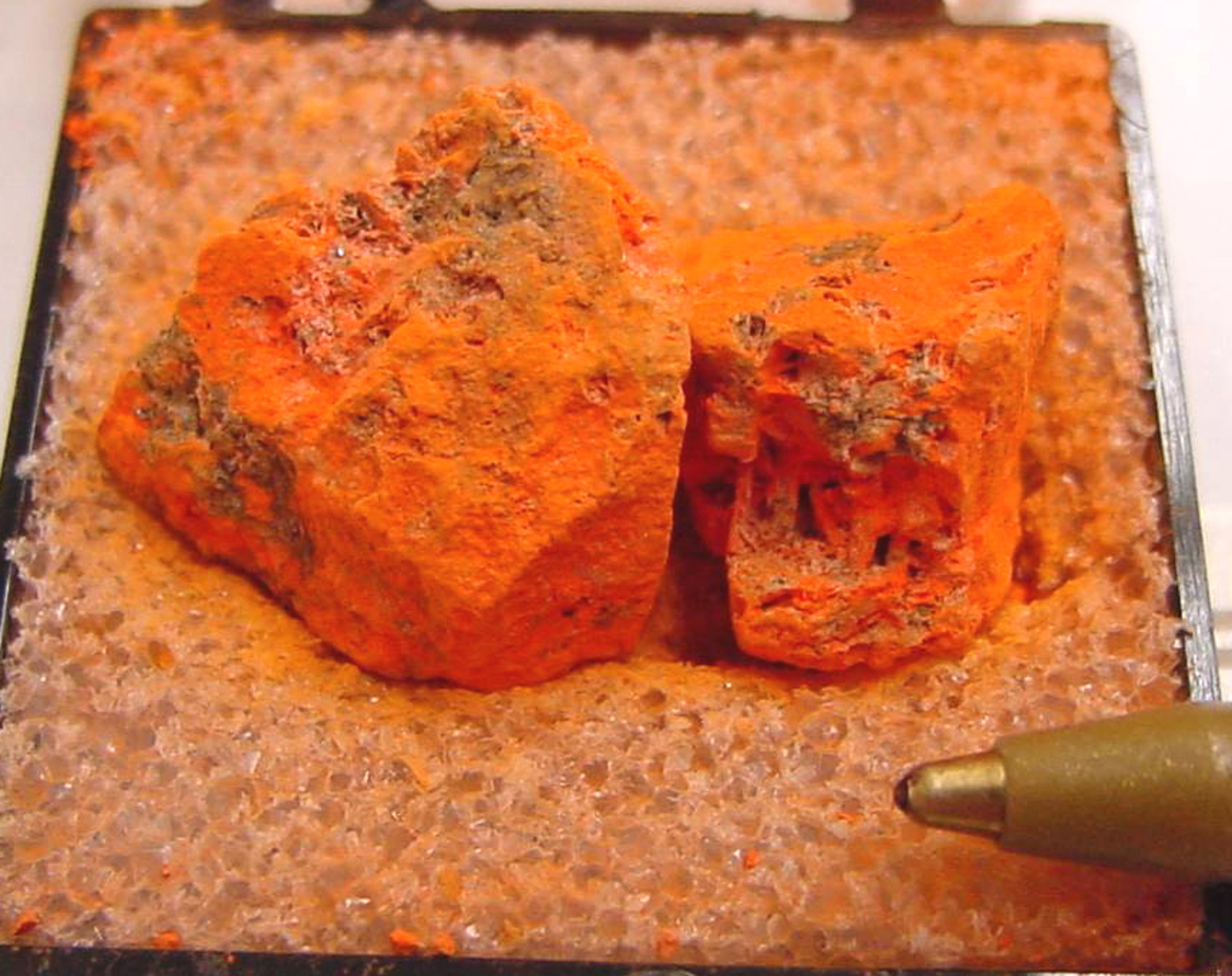
Minium from a mine fire at Broken Hill, Australia

== History ==
This compound's Latin name minium originates from the Minius, a river in northwest Iberia where it was first mined.

Lead(II,IV) oxide was used as a red pigment in ancient Rome, where it was prepared by calcination of white lead. In the ancient and medieval periods, it was used as a pigment in the production of illuminated manuscripts, and gave its name to the minium or miniature, a style of picture painted with the colour.

Made into a paint with linseed oil, red lead was used as a durable paint to protect exterior ironwork. In 1504, the portcullis at Stirling Castle in Scotland was painted with red lead, as were cannons including Mons Meg.

As a finely divided powder, it was also sprinkled on dielectric surfaces to study Lichtenberg figures.

In traditional Chinese medicine, red lead is used to treat ringworms and ulcerations, though the practice is limited due to its toxicity. Also, azarcón, a Mexican folk remedy for gastrointestinal disorders, contains up to 95% lead(II,IV) oxide.

It was also used before the 18th century as medicine.

== See also ==
- Lead paint
- Lead(II) oxide, PbO
- Lead(IV) oxide, PbO_{2}
- List of inorganic pigments
- Minium (mineral)
- Minium (pigment)
