= Lead compounds =

Type of compound

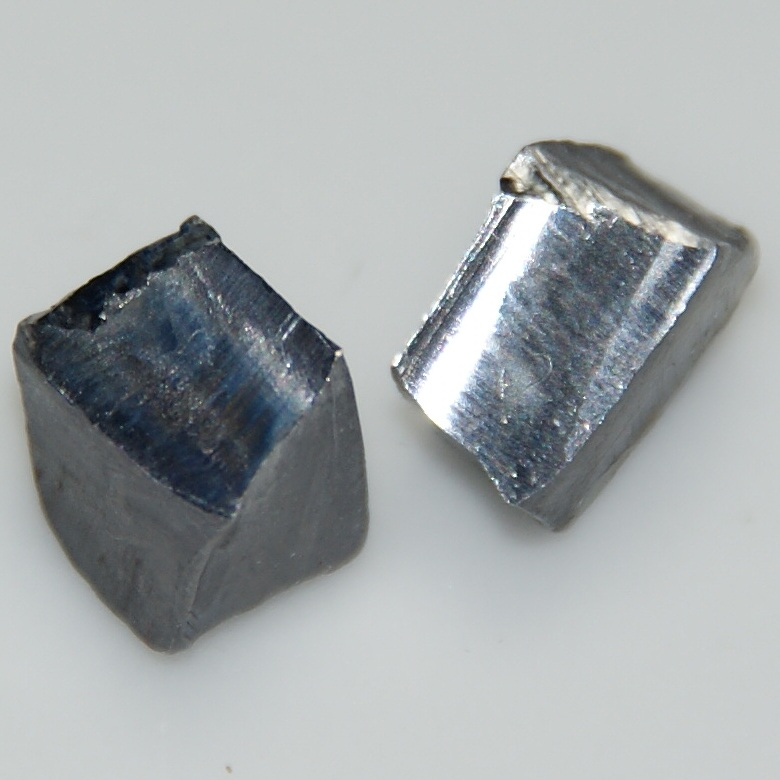
Tarnished lead (left) and shiny lead (right)

Compounds of lead exist with lead in two main oxidation states: +2 and +4. The former is more common. Inorganic lead(IV) compounds are typically strong oxidants or exist only in highly acidic solutions.

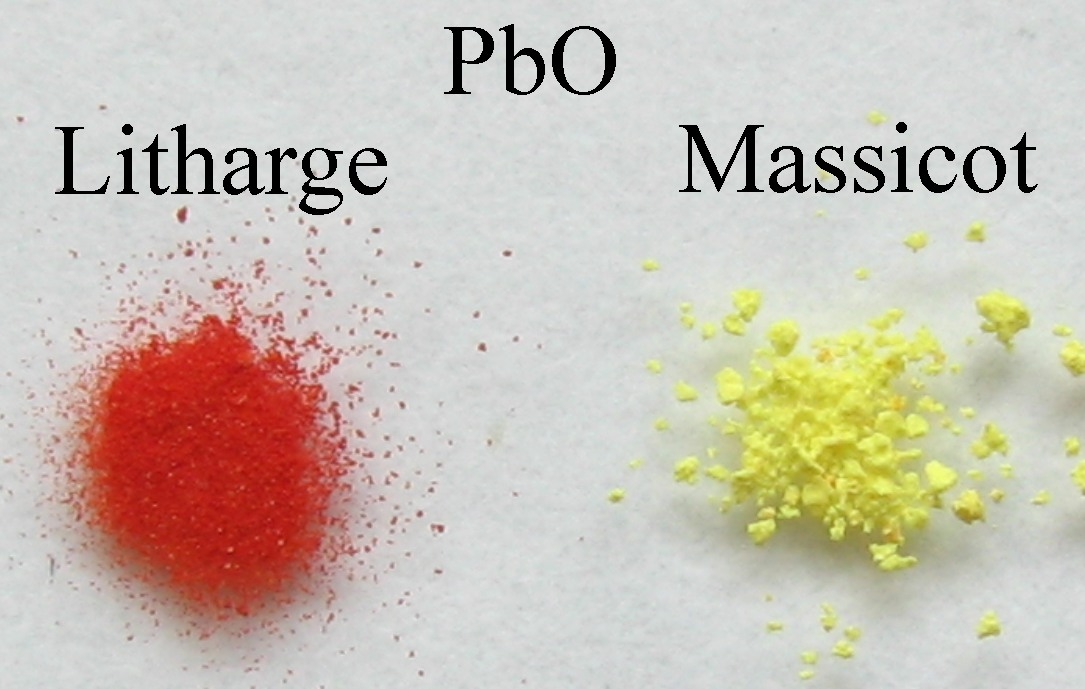
Red α-PbO and yellow β-PbO

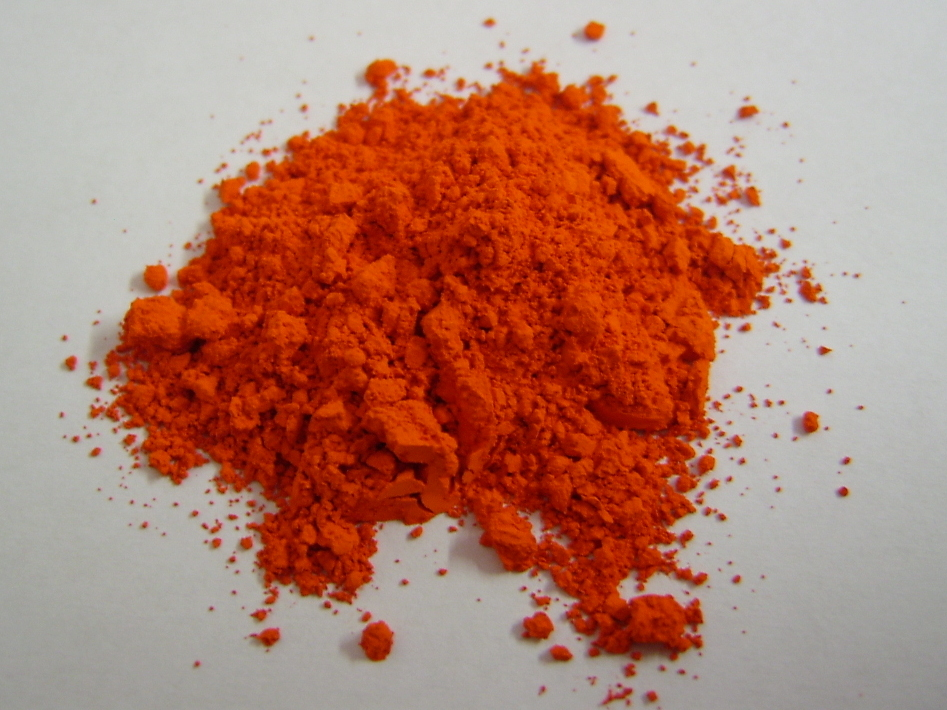
The mixed valence oxide Pb_{3}O_{4}

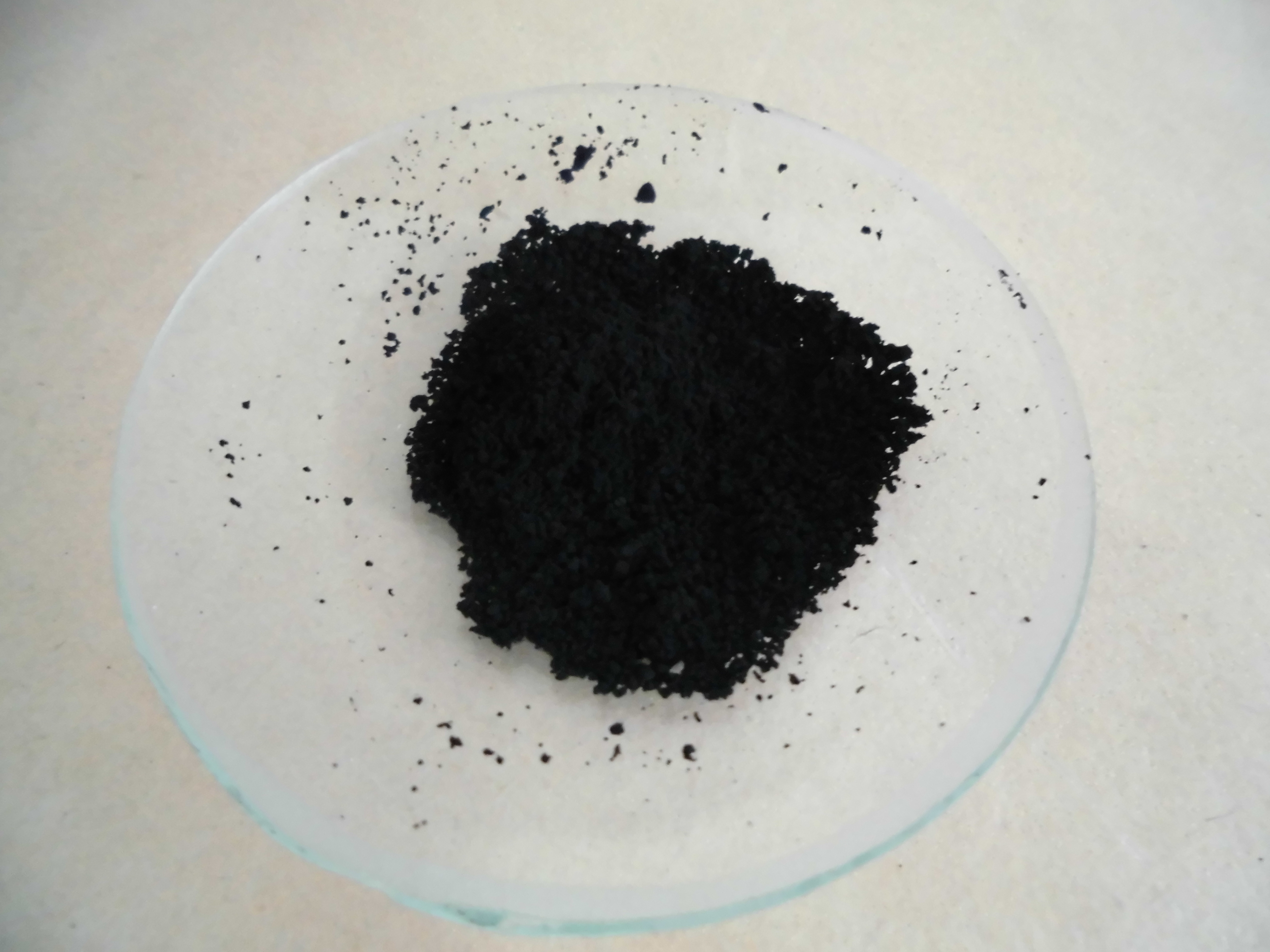
Black PbO_{2} which is a strong oxidizer

== Chemistry ==
Various oxidized forms of lead are easily reduced to the metal. An example is heating PbO with mild organic reducing agents such as glucose. The mixture of the oxide and the sulfide heated together will also form the metal.

2 PbO + PbS → 3 Pb + SO_{2}

Metallic lead is attacked (oxidized) only superficially by air, forming a thin layer of lead oxide that protects it from further oxidation. The metal is not attacked by sulfuric or hydrochloric acids. It dissolves in nitric acid with the evolution of nitric oxide gas to form dissolved Pb(NO_{3})_{2}.

3 Pb + 8 H^{+} + 8 NO^{−}_{3} → 3 Pb^{2+} + 6 NO^{−}_{3} + 2 NO + 4 H_{2}O

When heated with nitrates of alkali metals, metallic lead oxidizes to form PbO (also known as litharge), leaving the corresponding alkali nitrite. PbO is representative of lead's +2 oxidation state. It is soluble in nitric and acetic acids, from which solutions it is possible to precipitate halide, sulfate, chromate, carbonate (PbCO_{3}), and basic carbonate (Pb_{3}(OH)_{2}(CO_{3})_{2}) salts of lead. The sulfide can also be precipitated from acetate solutions. These salts are all poorly soluble in water. Among the halides, the iodide is less soluble than the bromide, which, in turn, is less soluble than the chloride.

Lead(II) oxide is also soluble in alkali hydroxide solutions to form the corresponding plumbite salt.

PbO + 2 OH^{−} + H_{2}O → Pb(OH)^{2−}_{4}

Chlorination of plumbite solutions causes the formation of lead's +4 oxidation state.

Pb(OH)^{2−}_{4} + Cl_{2} → PbO_{2} + 2 Cl^{−} + 2 H_{2}O

Lead dioxide is representative of the +4 oxidation state, and is a powerful oxidizing agent. The chloride of this oxidation state is formed only with difficulty and decomposes readily into lead(II) chloride and chlorine gas. The bromide and iodide of lead(IV) are not known to exist. Lead dioxide dissolves in alkali hydroxide solutions to form the corresponding plumbates.

PbO_{2} + 2 OH^{−} + 2 H_{2}O → Pb(OH)^{2−}_{6}

Lead also has an oxide with mixed +2 and +4 oxidation states, red lead (Pb_{3}O_{4}), also known as minium.

Lead readily forms an equimolar alloy with sodium metal that reacts with alkyl halides to form organometallic compounds of lead such as tetraethyllead.

== Oxides and sulfide ==
There are three oxides known: PbO, Pb_{3}O_{4} (sometimes called "minium"), and PbO_{2}. The former has two allotropes: α-PbO and β-PbO, both with layer structure and tetracoordinated lead. The alpha allotrope is red-colored and has the Pb–O distance of 230 pm; the beta allotrope is yellow-colored and has the Pb–O distance of 221 and 249 pm (due to asymmetry). Thanks to the similarity, both allotropes can exist under standard conditions (beta with small (10^{−5} relative) impurities, such as Si, Ge, Mo, etc.). PbO reacts with acids to form salts, and with alkalies to give plumbites, [Pb(OH)_{3}]^{−} or [Pb(OH)_{4}]^{2−}.

The dioxide may be prepared by, for example, halogenization of lead(II) salts. The alpha allotrope is rhombohedral, and the beta allotrope is tetragonal. Both allotropes are black-brown in color and always contain some water, which cannot be removed, as heating also causes decomposition (to PbO and Pb_{3}O_{4}). The dioxide is a powerful oxidizer: it can oxidize hydrochloric and sulfuric acids. It does not react with alkaline solution, but reacts with solid alkalis to give hydroxyplumbates, or with basic oxides to give plumbates.

Reaction of lead with sulfur or hydrogen sulfide yields lead sulfide (PbS). The solid has the NaCl-like structure (simple cubic), which it keeps up to the melting point, 1114 °C (2037 °F). If heated in the presence of air, PbS decomposes to give the monoxide and the sulfate. The compounds are almost insoluble in water, weak acids, and (NH_{4})_{2}S/(NH_{4})_{2}S_{2} solution is the key for separation of lead from analytical groups I to III elements, tin, arsenic, and antimony. PbS dissolves in nitric and hydrochloric acid, to give elemental sulfur and hydrogen sulfide, respectively. Heating mixtures of the monoxide and the sulfide forms the metal.

2 PbO + PbS → 3 Pb + SO_{2}↑

== Halides and other salts ==
Heating lead carbonate with hydrogen fluoride yields the hydrofluoride, which decomposes to the difluoride when it melts. This white crystalline powder is more soluble than the diiodide, but less than the dibromide and the dichloride. No coordinated lead fluorides exist (except the unstable PbF^{+} cation). Lead tetrafluoride, a yellow crystalline powder, is unstable.

Other dihalides are received upon heating lead(II) salts with the halides of other metals; lead dihalides precipitate to give white orthorhombic crystals (diiodide form yellow hexagonal crystals). They can also be obtained by direct elements reaction at temperature exceeding melting points of dihalides. Their solubility increases with temperature; adding more halides first decreases the solubility, but then increases due to complexation, with the maximum coordination number being 6. The complexation depends on halide ion numbers, atomic number of the alkali metal, the halide of which is added, temperature and solution ionic strength. Lead tetrachloride is obtained upon dissolving the dioxide in hydrochloric acid; to prevent the exothermic decomposition, it is kept under concentrated sulfuric acid. The tetrabromide may not, and the tetraiodide definitely does not exist. The diastatide has also been prepared.

The metal is not attacked by sulfuric or hydrochloric acids. It dissolves in nitric acid with the evolution of nitric oxide gas to form dissolved Pb(NO_{3})_{2}. It is a well-soluble solid in water; it is thus a key to receive the precipitates of halide, sulfate, chromate, carbonate, and basic carbonate Pb_{3}(OH)_{2}(CO_{3})_{2} salts of lead.

=== Chloride complexes ===
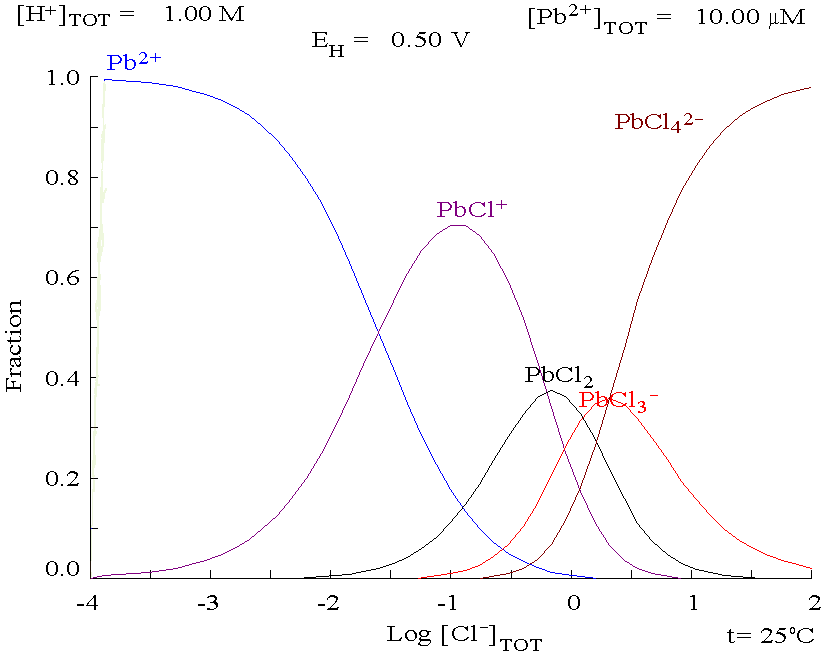
Diagram showing the forms of lead in chloride media.

Lead(II) forms a series of complexes with chloride, the formation of which alters the corrosion chemistry of the lead. This will tend to limit the solubility of lead in saline media.

Equilibrium constants for aqueous lead chloride complexes at 25 °C
Pb^{2+} + Cl^{−} → PbCl^{+}	K_{1} = 12.59
PbCl^{+} + Cl^{−} → PbCl_{2}	K_{2} = 14.45
PbCl_{2} + Cl^{−} → PbCl^{−}_{3}	K_{3} = 0.398
PbCl^{−}_{3} + Cl^{−} → PbCl^{2−}_{4}	K_{4} = 0.0892

== Organolead ==
The best-known compounds are the two simplest plumbane derivatives: tetramethyllead (TML) and tetraethyllead (TEL); however, the homologs of these, as well as hexaethyldilead (HEDL), are of lesser stability. The tetralkyl derivatives contain lead(IV); the Pb–C bonds are covalent. They thus resemble typical organic compounds.

Lead readily forms an equimolar alloy with sodium metal that reacts with alkyl halides to form organometallic compounds of lead such as tetraethyllead. The Pb–C bond energies in TML and TEL are only 167 and 145 kJ/mol; the compounds thus decompose upon heating, with first signs of TEL decomposition seen at 100 °C (210 °F). Pyrolysis yields elemental lead and alkyl radicals; their interreaction causes the synthesis of HEDL. They also decompose upon sunlight or UV-light. In presence of chlorine, the alkyls begin to be replaced with chlorides; the R_{2}PbCl_{2} in the presence of HCl (a by-product of the previous reaction) leads to the complete mineralization to give PbCl_{2}. Reaction with bromine follows the same principle.

== Phase diagrams of solubilities ==
Lead(II) sulfate is poorly soluble, as can be seen in the following diagram showing addition of SO^{2−}_{4} to a solution containing 0.1 M of Pb^{2+}. The pH of the solution is 4.5, as above that, Pb^{2+} concentration can never reach 0.1 M due to the formation of Pb(OH)_{2}. Observe that Pb^{2+} solubility drops 10,000 fold as SO^{2−}_{4} reaches 0.1 M.

Plot showing aqueous concentration of dissolved Pb^{2+} as a function of SO^{2−}_{4}	Diagram for lead in sulfate media

The addition of chloride can lower the solubility of lead, though in chloride-rich media (such as aqua regia) the lead can become soluble again as anionic chloro complexes.

Diagram showing the solubility of lead in chloride media. The lead concentrations are plotted as a function of the total chloride present.	Pourbaix diagram for lead in chloride (0.1 M) media

== Bibliography ==
- Polyanskiy, N. G. (1986). Fillipova, N. A (ed.). Аналитическая химия элементов: Свинец [Analytical Chemistry of the Elements: Lead] (in Russian). Nauka.
