= Lead halide =

Lead halide refers to any of a group of chemical compounds in which lead is joined to an element from the halide group.

Compounds within this group include:

- Lead(II) fluoride
- Lead(II) chloride
- Lead(II) bromide
- Lead(II) iodide
