= Lead(II) sulfate =

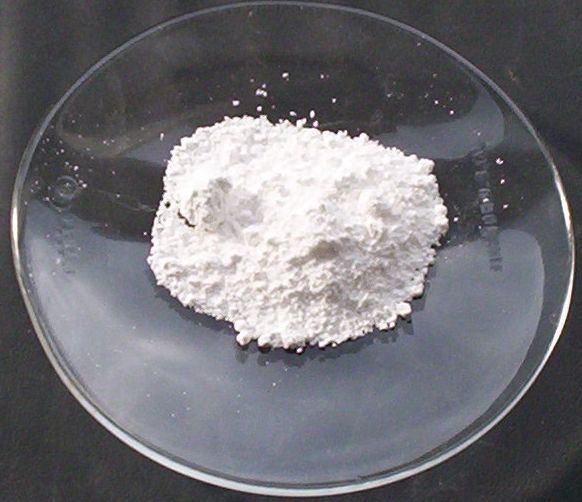
- sample of lead(II) sulfate

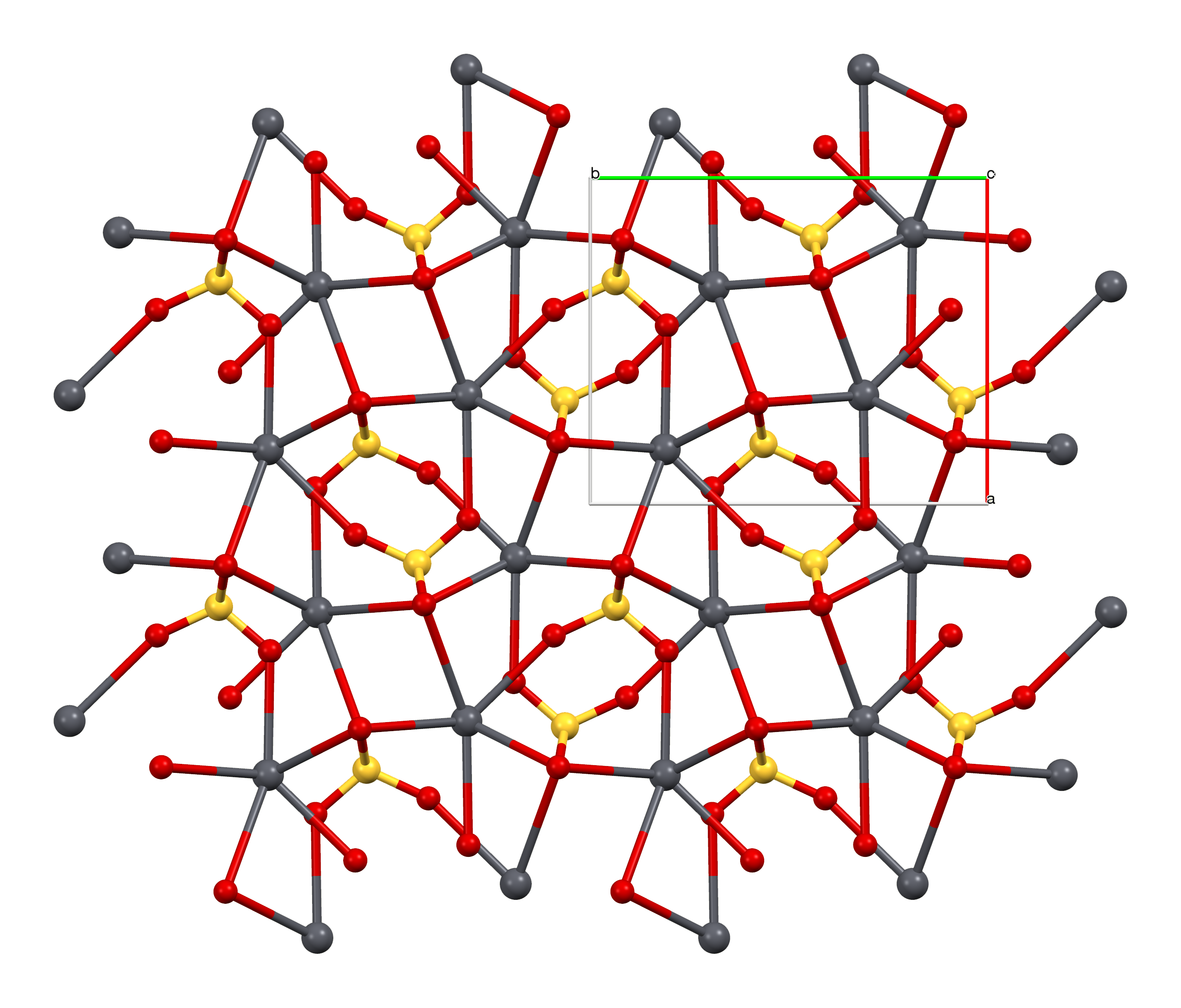
- Crystal structure of lead(II) sulfate

Names
- IUPAC name lead(II) sulfate
- Other names Anglesite, fast white, milk white, plumbous sulfate

Identifiers
CAS Number	7446-14-2
3D model (JSmol)	Interactive image
ChemSpider	19956579
ECHA InfoCard	100.028.362
EC Number	231-198-9
PubChem CID	24008
UNII	C516H654O8
UN number	1759 1794
CompTox Dashboard (EPA)	DTXSID50883502
- InChI: InChI=1S/H2O4S.Pb.4H/c1-5(2,3)4;;;;;/h(H2,1,2,3,4);;;;;/q;+2;;;;/p-2 Key: PIJPYDMVFNTHIP-UHFFFAOYSA-L; InChI=1S/H2O4S.Pb.4H/c1-5(2,3)4;;;;;/h(H2,1,2,3,4);;;;;/q;+2;;;;/p-2 Key: PIJPYDMVFNTHIP-QKXYEYSFAV; Key: PIJPYDMVFNTHIP-UHFFFAOYSA-L
- SMILES: [O-]S(=O)(=O)[O-].[Pb+2]

Properties
Chemical formula	PbSO_{4}
Molar mass	303.3 g·mol^{-1}
Appearance	white solid
Density	6.29 g/cm^{3}
Melting point	1,087 °C (1,989 °F; 1,360 K) decomposes
Solubility in water	0.0032 g/100 mL (15 °C); 0.00425 g/100 mL (25 °C)
Solubility product (K_{sp})	2.13 × 10^{−8} (20 °C)
Solubility	insoluble in alcohol soluble in ammonium acetate (≥ 6 mol/L) soluble in ammonium tartrate in presence of ammonium chloride and ammonia
Magnetic susceptibility (χ)	−69.7·10^{−6} cm^{3}/mol
Refractive index (n_{D})	1.877

Structure
Crystal structure	orthorhombic, barite

Thermochemistry
Heat capacity (C)	103 J/degree mol
Std molar entropy (S^{⦵}_{298})	149 J·mol^{−1}·K^{−1}
Std enthalpy of formation (Δ_{f}H^{⦵}_{298})	−920 kJ·mol^{−1}

Hazards
- GHS labelling
Pictograms	(GHS07: Exclamation mark) (GHS08: Health hazard) (GHS09: Environmental hazard)
Signal word	Danger
Hazard statements	H302, H332, H360Df, H410
Precautionary statements	P201, P202, P260, P264, P270, P271, P273, P281, P301+P312, P304+P312, P304+P340, P308+P313, P312, P314, P330, P391, P405, P501
NFPA 704 (fire diamond)	3 0 0
Flash point	Non-flammable
Threshold limit value (TLV)	0.15 mg/m^{3}

Related compounds
Other anions	Lead(II) chloride, Lead(II) bromide, Lead(II) iodide, Lead(II) fluoride
Other cations	Tin(II) sulfate, Sodium sulfate, Copper(II) sulfate
- Except where otherwise noted, data are given for materials in their standard state (at 25 °C [77 °F], 100 kPa). verify (what is ?) Infobox references

Lead(II) sulfate (PbSO_{4}) is a white solid, which appears white in microcrystalline form. It is also known as fast white, milk white, sulfuric acid lead salt or anglesite.

It is often seen in the plates/electrodes of car batteries, as it is formed when the battery is discharged (when the battery is recharged, then the lead sulfate is transformed back to metallic lead and sulfuric acid on the negative terminal or lead dioxide and sulfuric acid on the positive terminal). Lead sulfate is poorly soluble in water.

== Structure ==
Anglesite (lead(II) sulfate, PbSO_{4}) adopts the same orthorhombic crystal structure as celestite (strontium sulfate, SrSO_{4}) and barite (barium sulfate, BaSO_{4}). All three minerals' structures are in the space group Pbnm (number 62). Each lead(II) ion is surrounded by 12 oxygen atoms from 7 sulfate ions, forming a PbO_{12} polyhedron. The lead–oxygen distances range from 2.612 Å to 3.267 Å and the average distance is 2.865 Å.

Coordination geometry in lead(II) sulfate
Lead coordination	Sulfate coordination

== Manufacturing ==
Lead(II) sulfate is prepared by treating lead oxide, hydroxide or carbonate with warm sulfuric acid or by treating a soluble lead salt with sulfuric acid.

Alternatively, it can be made by the interaction of solutions of lead nitrate and sodium sulfate.

== Toxicology ==
Lead sulfate is toxic by inhalation, ingestion and skin contact. It is a cumulative poison, and repeated exposure may lead to anemia, kidney damage, eyesight damage or damage to the central nervous system (especially in children). It is also corrosive - contact with the eyes can lead to severe irritation or burns. Typical threshold limit value is 0.15 mg/m^{3}.

== Mineral ==
The naturally occurring mineral anglesite, PbSO_{4}, occurs as an oxidation product of primary lead sulfide ore,

== Basic and hydrogen lead sulfates ==
A number of lead basic sulfates are known: PbSO_{4}·PbO; PbSO_{4}·2PbO; PbSO_{4}·3PbO; PbSO_{4}·4PbO. They are used in manufacturing of active paste for lead–acid batteries. A related mineral is leadhillite, 2PbCO_{3}·PbSO_{4}·Pb(OH)_{2}.

At high concentration of sulfuric acid (>80%), lead hydrogensulfate, Pb(HSO_{4})_{2}, forms.

== Chemical properties ==
Lead(II) sulfate can be dissolved in concentrated HNO_{3}, HCl, H_{2}SO_{4} producing acidic salts or complex compounds, and in concentrated alkali giving soluble tetrahydroxidoplumbate(II) [Pb(OH)_{4}]^{2−} complexes.

PbSO_{4}(s) + H_{2}SO_{4}(l) ⇌ Pb(HSO_{4})_{2}(aq)

PbSO_{4}(s) + 4 NaOH(aq) → Na_{2}[Pb(OH)_{4}](aq) + Na_{2}SO_{4}(aq)

Lead(II) sulfate decomposes when heated above 1000 °C:

PbSO_{4}(s) → PbO(s) + SO_{3}(g)

== Applications ==
- Lead-acid storage batteries
- Paint pigments
- Laboratory reagent

== See also ==
- Lead paint
