= Vitriol =

Chemical compounds

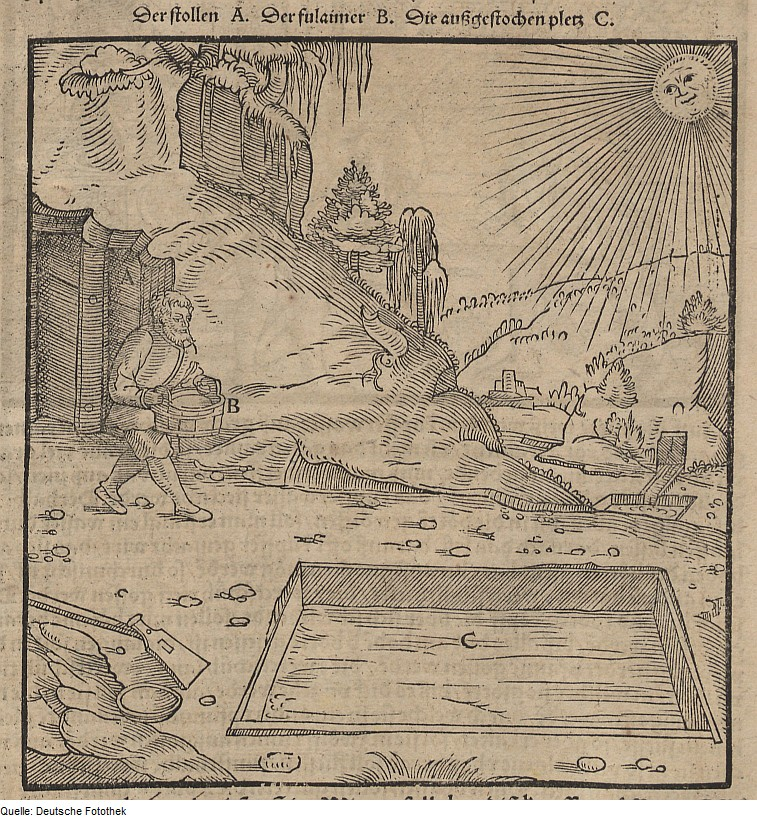
Woodcut print from the Berckwerck Buch (1580) by Georgius Agricola depicting mineral mining for vitriol

Vitriol is the general chemical name encompassing a class of chemical compounds comprising sulfates of certain metals – originally, iron or copper. Those mineral substances were distinguished by their color, such as green vitriol for hydrated iron(II) sulfate and blue vitriol for hydrated copper(II) sulfate.

These materials were found originally as crystals of sulfate minerals, formed by evaporation of groundwater that percolated through sulfide minerals and collected in pools on the floors of old mines. The word vitriol comes from the Latin word vitriolum, lit. 'small glass', as those crystals resembled small pieces of colored glass.

The historic alchemical symbol for vitriol is encoded in Unicode as U+1F716 🜖 ALCHEMICAL SYMBOL FOR VITRIOL. (Note: A vertically mirrored version of the same symbol is encoded as U+1F717 🜗 ALCHEMICAL SYMBOL FOR VITRIOL-2.)

== History ==
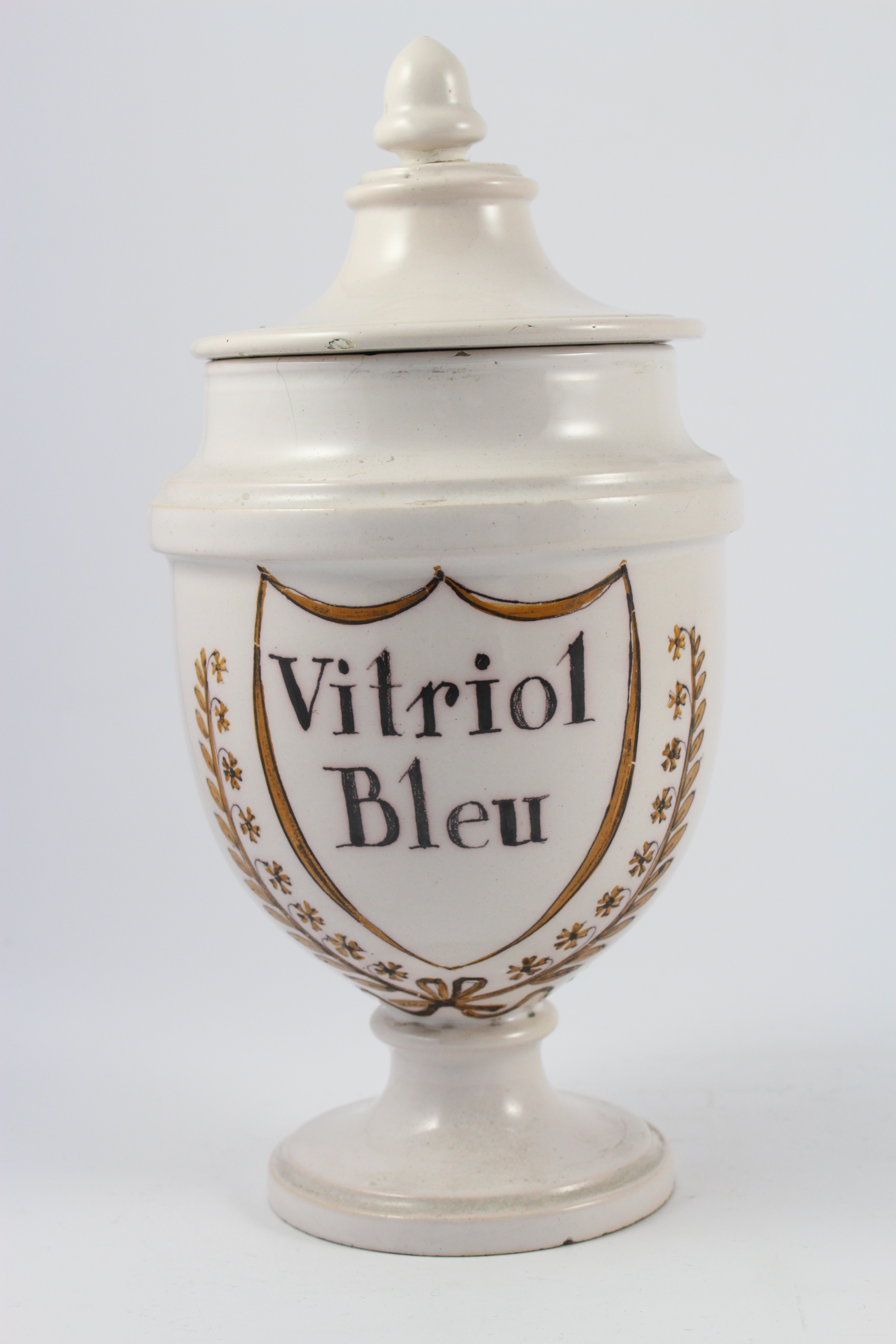
Ceramic pharmacy jar for storing blue vitriol (vitriol bleu) for medical use (Museum of the Civil Hospices of Lyon; Hôtel-Dieu de Lyon)

The study of vitriol began during ancient times. Sumerians had a list of types of vitriol that they classified according to the substances' color. Some of the earliest discussions of the origin and properties of vitriol is in the works of the Greek physician Dioscorides (first century AD) and the Roman naturalist Pliny the Elder (23–79 AD). Galen also discussed its medical use. Metallurgical uses for vitriolic substances were recorded in the Hellenistic alchemical works of Zosimos of Panopolis, in the treatise Phisica et Mystica, and the Leyden papyrus X.

Medieval Islamic chemists like Jābir ibn Ḥayyān (died c. 806–816 AD, known in Latin as Geber), Abū Bakr al-Rāzī (865–925 AD, known in Latin as Rhazes), Ibn Sina (980–1037 AD, known in Latin as Avicenna), and Muḥammad ibn Ibrāhīm al-Watwat (1234–1318 AD) included vitriol in their mineral classification lists.

Sulfuric acid was termed "oil of vitriol" by medieval European alchemists because it did not evaporate spontaneously in air (hence oil vs spirit in archaic parlance), and it was prepared by roasting "green vitriol" (typically a mixture of iron and copper sulfates) in an iron retort. The first vague allusions to it appear in the works of Vincent of Beauvais, in the Compositum de Compositis ascribed to Saint Albertus Magnus, and in pseudo-Geber's Summa perfectionis (all thirteenth century AD). The figurative term vitriolic in the sense of "harshly condemnatory" is derived from the corrosive nature of this substance.

Systematic attempts to identify and analyze the nature of the various substances classed as vitriols were in full swing by the late 17th century.

== Vitriols ==
Vitriol	Chemical	Mineral	Comment	Formula	Image
Black vitriol			sulfate • heptahydrate (hydrated sulfate) (Note: Many sources state that black vitriol "is a mixture of iron sulfate and iron sulfite", but none give a reference of any sort. The book, Chemistry, Inorganic & Organic, with Experiments, by Bloxam is a published, reliable reference for the composition of black vitriol, and it states on page 513, "The formula of black vitriol may be written [CuMgFeMnCoNi]SO_{4}·7H_{2}O, the six isomorphous metals being interchangeable without altering the general character of the salt.")	[Cu,Mg,Fe,Mn,Co,Ni]SO_{4}·7H_{2}O (Note: "Any combination of these elements may be found in black vitriol.")	
Blue vitriol • Roman vitriol • Vitriol of Cyprus • Vitriol of Venus (Note: The names "Venus", "Mars", and "Jove" (a.k.a. Jupiter) refer to planetary metals now known as copper, iron, and tin respectively.)	copper(II) sulfate	chalcanthite	cupric sulfate • pentahydrate	CuSO_{4}·5H_{2}O	
Copperas • Green vitriol • Vitriol of Mars	iron(II) sulfate	melanterite	ferrous sulfate • heptahydrate	FeSO_{4}·7H_{2}O	
Red vitriol	cobalt(II) sulfate (Note: Historic sources identified red vitriol as the product of heating green vitriol or collecting the remains of distilling vitriol to produce oil of vitriol. These methods are consistent with the oxidation of iron(II) sulfate to iron(III), which decomposes into iron(III) oxide (equivalent to red hematite) and sulfur trioxide. Cobalt was not discovered until the 18th century.)		heptahydrate	CoSO_{4}·7H_{2}O	
Vitriol of argile • Vitriol of clay	aluminium sulfate	alunogen	alum	Al_{2}(SO_{4})_{3}	
Vitriol of Jove	tin(II) sulfate		stannous sulfate · deliquescent	SnSO_{4}	
White vitriol	zinc sulfate	possibly goslarite	heptahydrate	ZnSO_{4}·7H_{2}O	

== Derivative "oils" ==
Oil of vitriol was an old name for concentrated sulfuric acid, which was historically obtained through the destructive distillation (pyrolysis) of vitriols (sulfates). The name, abbreviated to vitriol, continued to be used for this viscous liquid long after the minerals came to be termed "sulfates".

Oil	Chemical	Comment	Formula	Image
Oil of vitriol • Spirit of vitriol	sulfuric acid	acid	H_{2}SO_{4}	
Sweet oil of vitriol	diethyl ether	not a sulfate, but was synthesized from sulfuric acid and ethanol by Valerius Cordus	CH_{3}-CH_{2}-O-CH_{2}-CH_{3}	Diethyl ether liquid in a brown-tinted glass bottle
