= Ammonium hexachloroplumbate =

Names
- IUPAC name Ammonium hexachloroplumbate(2–)
- Other names Ammonium hexachloroplumbate(IV)

Identifiers
CAS Number	17362-45-7
3D model (JSmol)	Interactive image
- InChI: InChI=1S/6ClH.2H3N.Pb/h6*1H;2*1H3;/q;;;;;;;;+4/p-4 Key: WYELAMVRPGPECN-UHFFFAOYSA-J
- SMILES: [NH4+].[NH4+].Cl[Pb-2](Cl)(Cl)(Cl)(Cl)Cl

Properties
Chemical formula	Cl_{6}H_{8}N_{2}Pb
Molar mass	456.0 g·mol^{−1}
Appearance	yellow crystals
Density	2.925 g/cm^{3}
Melting point	120
Solubility in water	slightly soluble (cold); decomposes (hot)
- Except where otherwise noted, data are given for materials in their standard state (at 25 °C [77 °F], 100 kPa). Infobox references

Ammonium hexachloroplumbate is an inorganic chemical compound with the chemical formula (NH_{4})_{2}PbCl_{6}.

== Synthesis ==
Adding ammonium chloride to a solution of lead(IV) tetraacetate in concentrated hydrochloric acid.

== Physical properties ==
Ammonium hexachloroplumbate forms yellow crystals of cubic system.

The compound is slightly soluble in cold water and decomposes in hot water.

== Chemical properties ==
When added to cold concentrated sulphuric acid, the compound decomposes, yielding PbCl_{4}:

(NH_{4})_{2}PbCl_{6} + H_{2}SO_{4} → (NH_{4})_{2}SO_{4} + PbCl_{4} + 2HCl

The compound chlorinates tetraorganolead and hexaorganodilead compounds.
