= Lead(II) chloride (data page) =

Chemical data page

This page provides supplementary chemical data on lead(II) chloride.

== Structure and properties ==
Molecular structure
Point group	?
Coordination geometry	?
Bond strength	?
Bond length	?
Bond angle	?
Crystal data
Crystal system	Orthorhombic
Space group	Pnmb
Z	4
a	435.5 pm
b	762 pm
c	905 pm
Unit cell volume	312.74 Å^{3}
Properties
Dipole moment	? D
Index of refraction	?
Dielectric constant	? ε_{0} at ? °C
Magnetic susceptibility	?

== Thermodynamic properties ==
Phase behavior
Triple point	? K (? °C), ? Pa
Critical point	? K (? °C), ? Pa
Std enthalpy change of fusion, Δ_{fus}H^{~~o~~}	? kJ/mol
Std entropy change of fusion, Δ_{fus}S^{~~o~~}	? J/(mol·K)
Std enthalpy change of vaporization, Δ_{vap}H^{~~o~~}	? kJ/mol
Std entropy change of vaporization, Δ_{vap}S^{~~o~~}	? J/(mol·K)
Solid properties
Std enthalpy change of formation, Δ_{f}H^{~~o~~}_{solid}	? kJ/mol
Standard molar entropy, S^{~~o~~}_{solid}	? J/(mol K)
Heat capacity, c_{p}	? J/(mol K)
Liquid properties
Std enthalpy change of formation, Δ_{f}H^{~~o~~}_{liquid}	? kJ/mol
Standard molar entropy, S^{~~o~~}_{liquid}	? J/(mol K)
Heat capacity, c_{p}	? J/(mol K)
Gas properties
Std enthalpy change of formation, Δ_{f}H^{~~o~~}_{gas}	? kJ/mol
Standard molar entropy, S^{~~o~~}_{gas}	? J/(mol K)
Heat capacity, c_{p}	? J/(mol K)

== Spectral data ==
UV-Vis
λ_{max}	? nm
Extinction coefficient, ε	?
IR
Major absorption bands	? cm^{−1}
NMR
Proton NMR
Carbon-13 NMR
Other NMR data
MS
Masses of main fragments

== Regulatory data ==
Regulatory data
EINECS number	231-845-5
EU index number	082-001-00-6
PEL-TWA (OSHA)	0.05 mg/m^{3} (as Pb)
IDLH (NIOSH)	100 mg/m^{3} (as Pb)
Flash point	non flammable
RTECS number	OF9450000

== Material Safety Data Sheet ==
The handling of this chemical may incur notable safety precautions. It is highly recommend that you seek the Material Safety Datasheet (MSDS) for this chemical from a reliable source such as SIRI, and follow its directions.

This box:
- Except where noted otherwise, data relate to Standard temperature and pressure.
- Reliability of data general note.
