= Tin(II) sulfate =

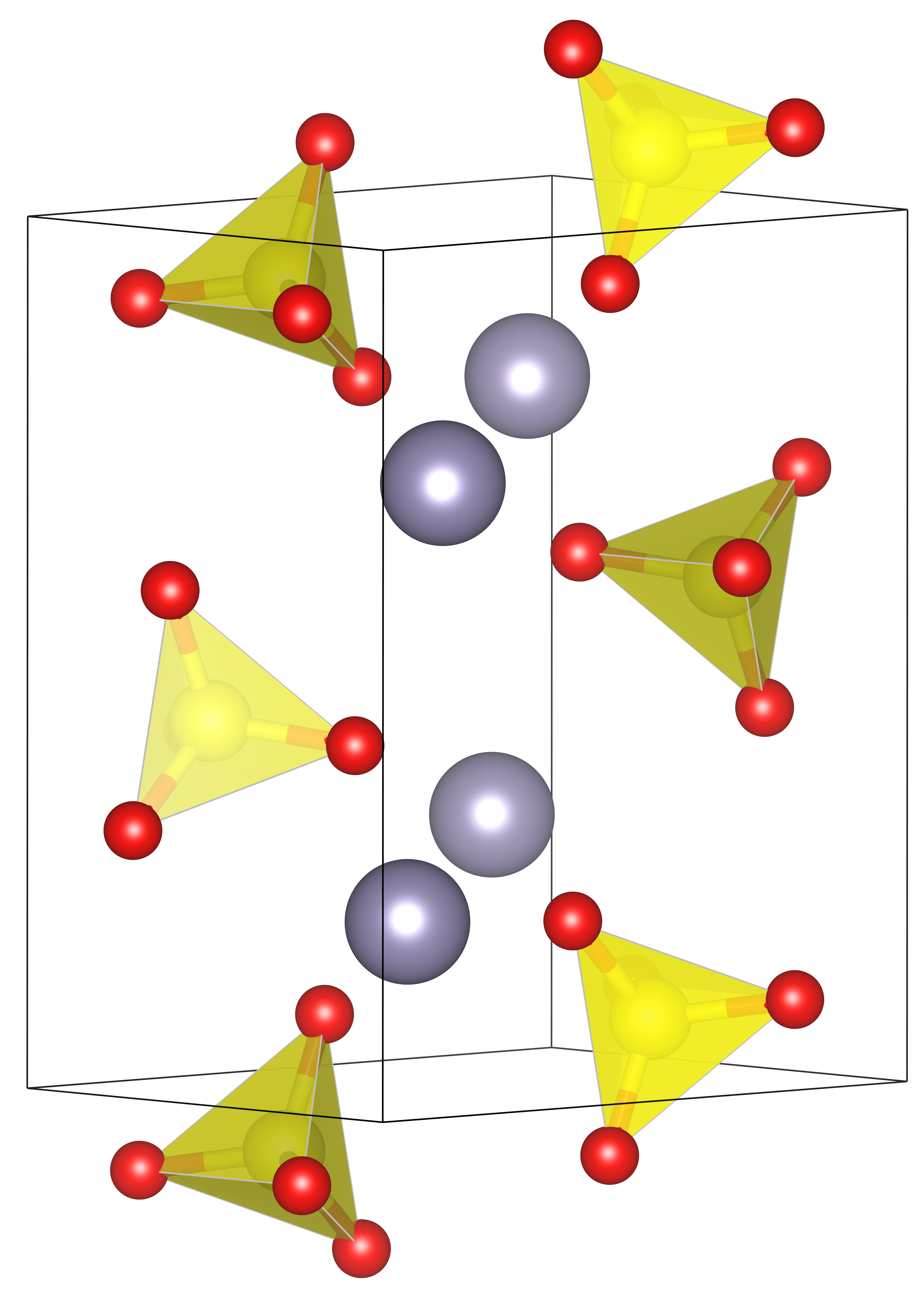
- Tin(II) sulfate Unit cell of tin(II) sulfate.

Names
- Other names Stannous sulfate

Identifiers
CAS Number	7488-55-3
3D model (JSmol)	Interactive image
ChemSpider	21106484
ECHA InfoCard	100.028.457
EC Number	231-302-2
PubChem CID	62643
UNII	0MFE10J96E
CompTox Dashboard (EPA)	DTXSID20884389
- InChI: InChI=1S/H2O4S.Sn.2H/c1-5(2,3)4;;;/h(H2,1,2,3,4);;;/q;+2;;/p-2 Key: RCIVOBGSMSSVTR-UHFFFAOYSA-L; InChI=1/H2O4S.Sn.2H/c1-5(2,3)4;;;/h(H2,1,2,3,4);;;/q;+2;;/p-2/rH2O4S.H2Sn/c1-5(2,3)4;/h(H2,1,2,3,4);1H2/q;+2/p-2 Key: RCIVOBGSMSSVTR-YHUAHBEBAB
- SMILES: [O-]S(=O)(=O)[O-].[SnH2+2]

Properties
Chemical formula	SnSO_{4}
Molar mass	214.773 g/mol
Appearance	white-yellowish crystalline solid deliquescent
Density	4.15 g/cm^{3}
Melting point	378 °C (712 °F; 651 K)
Boiling point	decomposes to SnO_{2} and SO_{2}
Solubility in water	33 g/100 mL (25 °C)

Structure
Crystal structure	Primitive orthorhombic
Space group	Pnma, No. 62
Lattice constant	a = 8.80 Å, b = 5.32 Å, c = 7.12 Å

Hazards
NFPA 704 (fire diamond)	1 0 0
Flash point	Non-flammable
- Lethal dose or concentration (LD, LC)
LD_{50} (median dose)	2207 mg/kg (oral, rat); 2152 mg/kg (oral, mouse)

Related compounds
Other anions	Tin(II) chloride, tin(II) bromide, tin(II) iodide
Other cations	Lead(II) sulfate
- Except where otherwise noted, data are given for materials in their standard state (at 25 °C [77 °F], 100 kPa). verify (what is ?) Infobox references

Tin(II) sulfate (SnSO_{4}) is a chemical compound. It is a white solid that can absorb enough moisture from the air to become fully dissolved, forming an aqueous solution; this property is known as deliquescence. It can be prepared by a displacement reaction between metallic tin and copper(II) sulfate:

Sn (s) + CuSO_{4} (aq) → Cu (s) + SnSO_{4} (aq)

Tin(II) sulfate is a convenient source of tin(II) ions uncontaminated by tin(IV) species.

== Structure ==
In the solid state the sulfate ions are linked together by O-Sn-O bridges. The tin atom has three oxygen atoms arranged pyramidally at 226 pm with the three O-Sn-O bond angles of 79°, 77.1° and 77.1°. Other Sn-O distances are longer ranging from 295 - 334pm.
