= Cotunnite =

Natural mineral form of lead(II) chloride

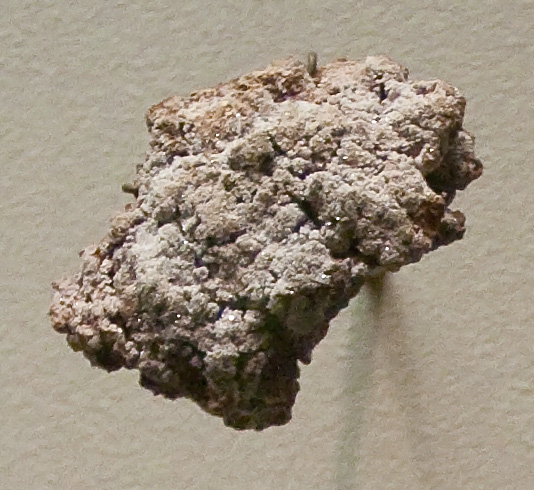
- Cotunnite

General
- Category: Halide mineral
- Formula: PbCl_{2}
- IMA symbol: Cot
- Strunz classification: 3.DC.85
- Crystal system: Orthorhombic
- Crystal class: Dipyramidal (mmm); H-M symbol: (2/m 2/m 2/m)
- Space group: Pnam
- Unit cell: a = 7.6222(5) Å, b = 9.0448(7) Å, c = 4.5348(4) Å; Z = 4

Identification
- Color: Colorless to white, pale green, pale yellow
- Crystal habit: As elongated, flattened prismatic crystals; in aggregates of radiating sprays; granular, crustiform or pseudomorphs
- Cleavage: Perfect on {010}
- Fracture: Subconchoidal
- Tenacity: Slightly sectile
- Mohs scale hardness: 2.5
- Luster: Adamantine, silky to pearly
- Diaphaneity: Transparent to opaque
- Specific gravity: 5.80
- Optical properties: Biaxial (+)
- Refractive index: n_{α} = 2.199 n_{β} = 2.217 n_{γ} = 2.260
- Birefringence: δ = 0.061
- 2V angle: Measured: 67°
- Solubility: Slight in water

Cotunnite is the natural mineral form of lead(II) chloride (PbCl_{2}). Unlike the pure compound, which is white, cotunnite can be white, yellow, or green. The density of mineral samples spans range 5.3–5.8 g/cm^{3}. The hardness on the Mohs scale is 1.5–2. The crystal structure is orthorhombic dipyramidal and the point group is 2/m 2/m 2/m. Each Pb has a coordination number of 9. Cotunnite occurs near volcanoes: Vesuvius, Italy; Tarapacá, Chile; and Tolbachik, Russia.

It was first described in 1825 from an occurrence on Mount Vesuvius, Naples Province, Campania, Italy. It was named for Domenico Cotugno (Cotunnius) (1736–1822), Italian physician and Professor of Anatomy.

It was first recognized in volcanic fumarole deposits. It occurs as a secondary alteration product in lead ore deposits. It has also been reported as an alteration of archaeological objects that contain lead.

It occurs in association with galena, cerussite, anglesite and matlockite in the Caracoles, Chile. At the Tolbachik volcano on the Kamchatka Peninsula, it occurs with the rare to uncommon minerals tenorite, ponomarevite, sofiite, burnsite, ilinskite, georgbokite, chloromenite, halite, sylvite and native gold.
