= Lead(IV) chloride =

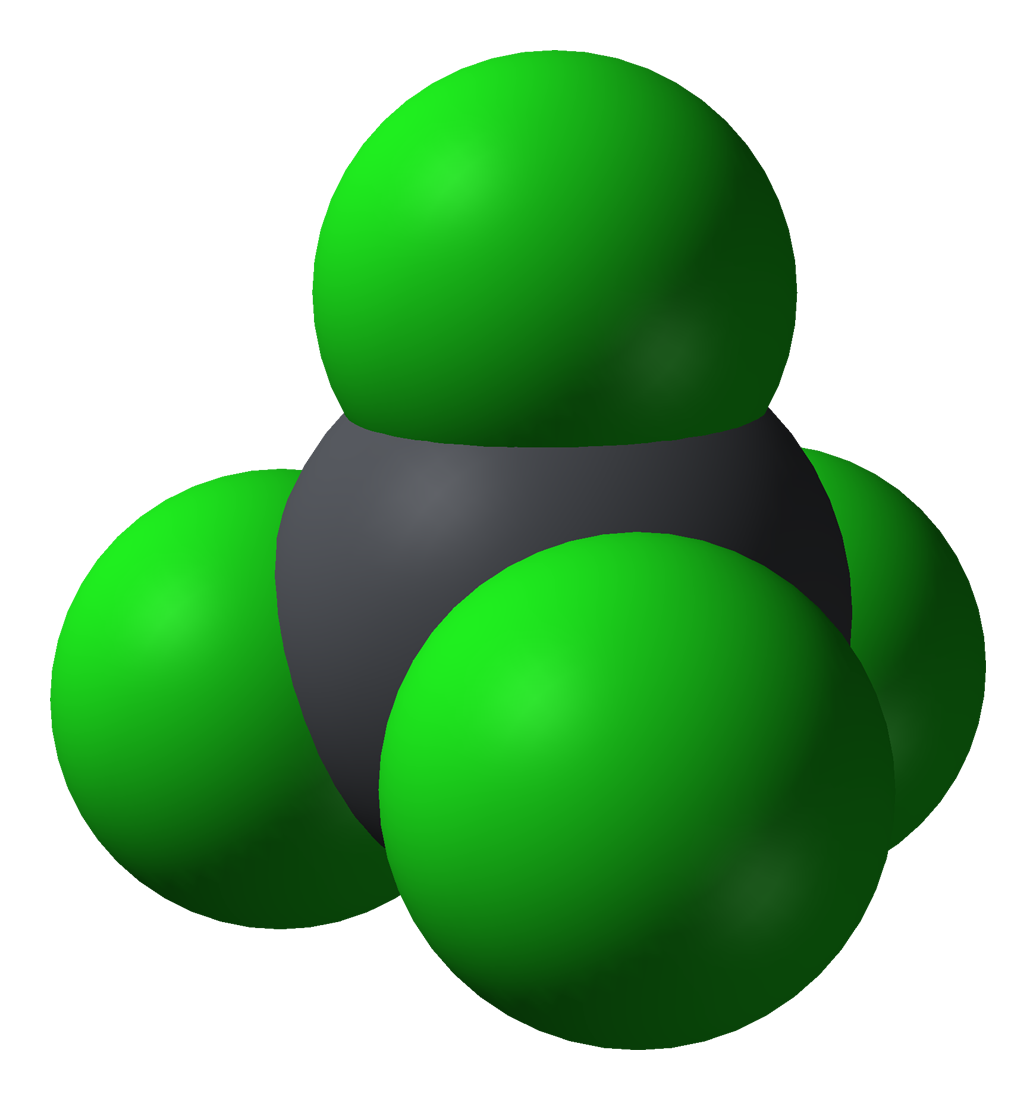

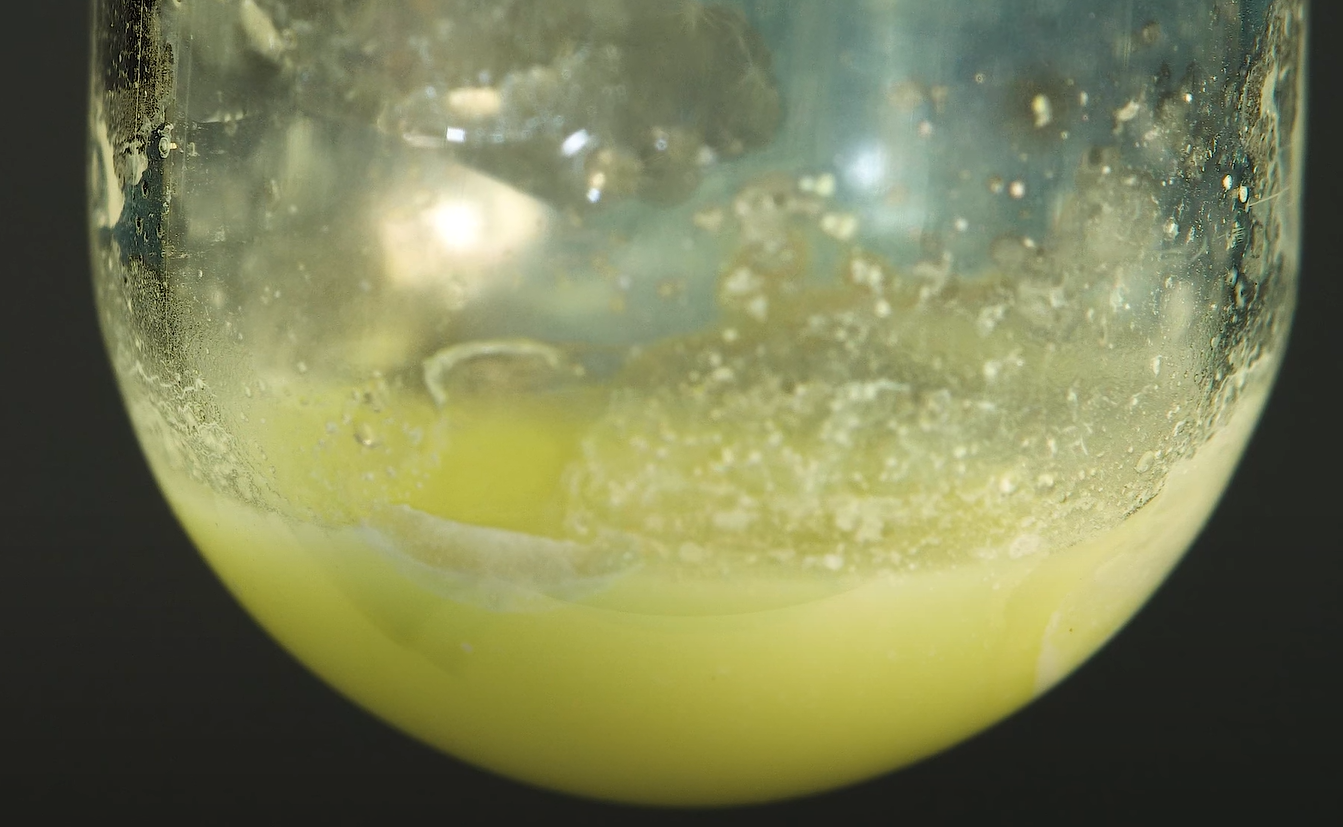
- Lead tetrachloride contaminated with lead(II) chloride

Names
- IUPAC name Lead(IV) chloride
- Systematic IUPAC name Tetrachloroplumbane

Identifiers
CAS Number	13463-30-4
3D model (JSmol)	Interactive image
ChemSpider	109913
PubChem CID	123310
CompTox Dashboard (EPA)	DTXSID40158837
- InChI: InChI=1S/4ClH.Pb/h4*1H;/q;;;;+4/p-4 Key: PJYXVICYYHGLSW-UHFFFAOYSA-J
- SMILES: Cl[Pb](Cl)(Cl)Cl

Properties
Chemical formula	PbCl_{4}
Molar mass	349.012 g/mol
Appearance	yellow oily liquid
Density	3.2 g⋅cm^{−3}
Melting point	−15 °C (5 °F; 258 K) stable below 0 °C (32 °F; 273 K)
Boiling point	50 °C (122 °F; 323 K) decomposes
Solubility in water	Reacts
Solubility	hydrochloric acid

Structure
Coordination geometry	4
Molecular shape	tetrahedral

Thermochemistry
Std enthalpy of formation (Δ_{f}H^{⦵}_{298})	−328.9 kJ/mol
- Except where otherwise noted, data are given for materials in their standard state (at 25 °C [77 °F], 100 kPa). Infobox references

Lead tetrachloride, also known as lead(IV) chloride, has the molecular formula PbCl_{4}. It is a yellow, oily liquid which is stable below 0 °C, and decomposes at 50 °C. It has a tetrahedral configuration, with lead as the central atom. The Pb–Cl covalent bonds have been measured to be 247 pm and the bond energy is 243 kJ⋅mol^{−1}.

== Synthesis ==
Lead tetrachloride can be made by reacting lead(II) chloride PbCl_{2}, and hydrochloric acid HCl, in the presence of chlorine gas (Cl_{2}), leading to the formation of chloroplumbic acid H_{2}PbCl_{6}. It is then converted to the ammonium salt (NH_{4})_{2}PbCl_{6} by adding ammonium chloride (NH_{4}Cl). Finally, the solution is treated with concentrated sulfuric acid H_{2}SO_{4}, to separate out lead tetrachloride. This series of reactions is conducted at 0 °C. The following equations illustrate the reaction:

PbCl_{2} + 2HCl + Cl_{2} → H_{2}PbCl_{6}
H_{2}PbCl_{6} + 2 NH_{4}Cl → (NH_{4})_{2}PbCl_{6} + 2HCl
(NH_{4})_{2}PbCl_{6} + H_{2}SO_{4} → PbCl_{4}+ 2HCl + (NH_{4})_{2}SO_{4}

== Reaction with water ==
Unlike carbon tetrachloride, another group IV (IUPAC: group 14) chloride, lead tetrachloride reacts with water. This is because Pb has a larger atomic radius than C, so there is less steric hindrance around that central atom and water can more easily access it. Also, because of the presence of empty d atomic orbitals on the Pb atom, oxygen can bind to it before a Pb–Cl bond has to break, thus requiring less activation energy. The overall reaction is thus as follows:

PbCl_{4} + 2H_{2}O → PbO_{2}(s) + 4HCl(g)

== Stability ==
Lead tetrachloride tends to decompose further into lead dichloride and chlorine gas:

PbCl_{4} → PbCl_{2} + Cl_{2}(g)

There are reports that this reaction can proceed explosively and that the compound is best stored under pure sulfuric acid at –80 °C in the dark.

The stability of the +4 oxidation state decreases going down group 14 of the periodic table. Thus, while carbon tetrachloride is a stable compound, with lead the oxidation state +2 is favored and PbCl_{4} quickly becomes PbCl_{2}. Indeed, the inert pair effect causes lead to favor its +2 oxidation state: Pb atom loses all its outermost p electrons and ends up with a stable, filled s subshell.

== Toxicity ==
Lead is a cumulative poison. Only limited evidence have been shown of lead's carcinogenic effect, but lead tetrachloride, as well as all other lead compounds, is "reasonably anticipated to be human carcinogens" according to the Report on Carcinogens, Twelfth Edition (2011). Lead can be absorbed by the body through several routes, primarily inhalation but also ingestion and dermal contact. Lead compounds are also teratogens.
