= Lead(II) chloride =

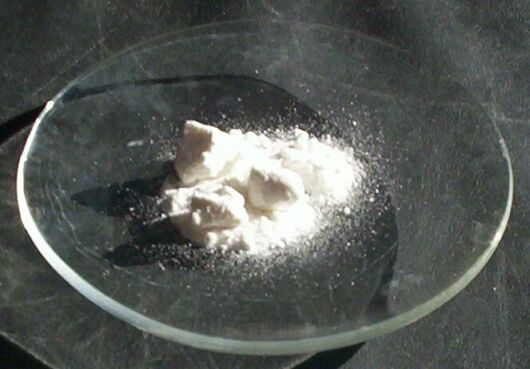
- Lead(II) chloride

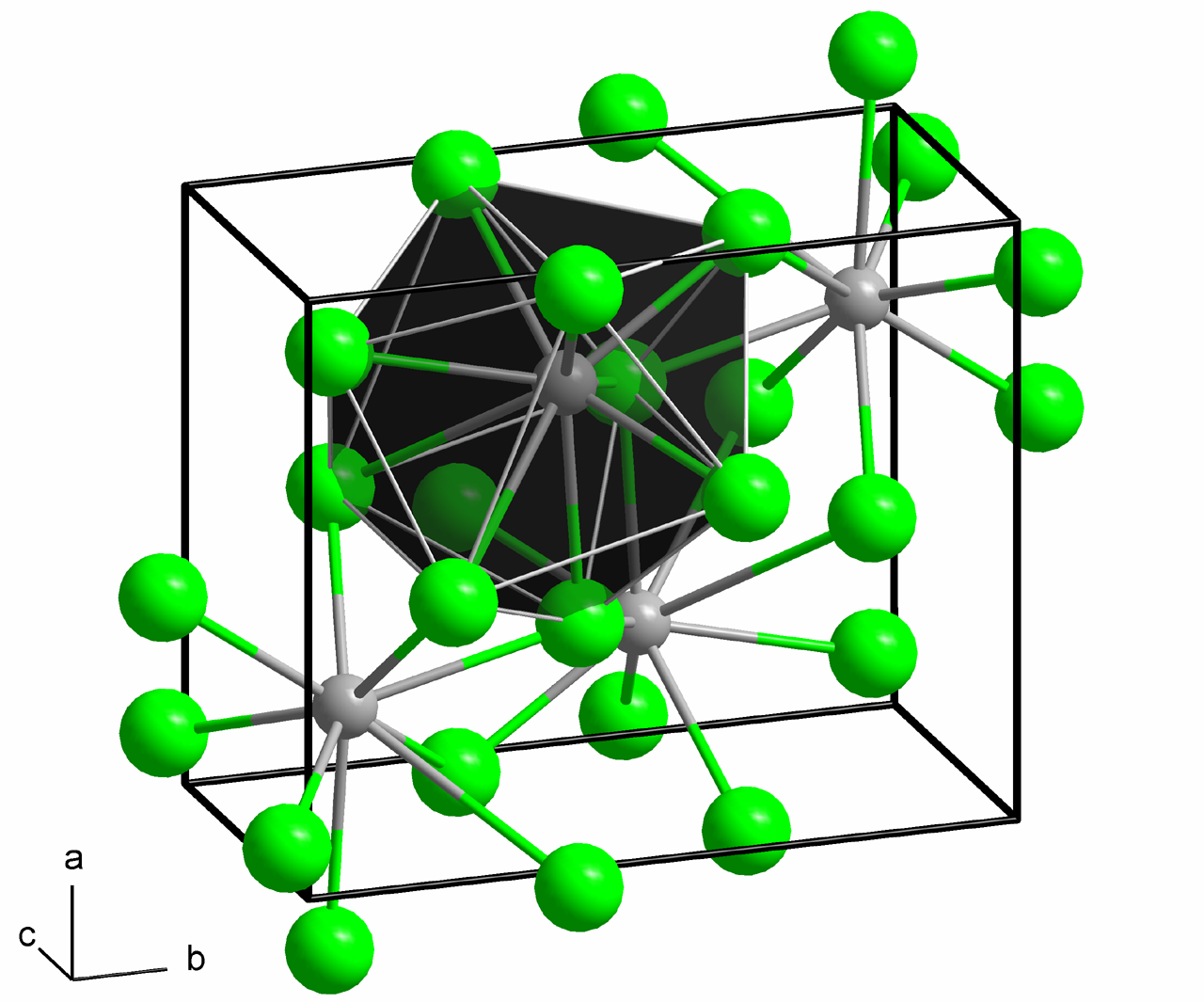
- The crystal structure of PbCl_{2}, in the unconventional crystallographic setting Pnam. This corresponds to the standard Pnma setting by switching the labels on the b and c axes.

Names
- IUPAC names Lead(II) chloride Lead dichloride
- Other names Plumbous chloride Cotunnite; Dichloroplumbylene

Identifiers
CAS Number	7758-95-4
3D model (JSmol)	Interactive image
ChEBI	CHEBI:88212
ChemSpider	22867
ECHA InfoCard	100.028.950
EC Number	231-845-5
PubChem CID	166945
UNII	4IL61GN3YI
CompTox Dashboard (EPA)	DTXSID1041059
- InChI: InChI=1S/2ClH.Pb/h2*1H;/q;;+2/p-2 Key: HWSZZLVAJGOAAY-UHFFFAOYSA-L
- SMILES: Cl[Pb]Cl

Properties
Chemical formula	PbCl_{2}
Molar mass	278.10 g/mol
Appearance	white odorless solid
Density	5.85 g/cm^{3}
Melting point	501 °C (934 °F; 774 K)
Boiling point	950 °C (1,740 °F; 1,220 K)
Solubility in water	0.99 g/100 mL (20 °C)
Solubility product (K_{sp})	1.7×10^{−5} (20 °C)
Solubility	slightly soluble in dilute HCl, ammonia; insoluble in alcohol Soluble in hot water as well as in presence of alkali hydroxide Soluble in concentrated HCl (>6M)
Magnetic susceptibility (χ)	−73.8·10^{−6} cm^{3}/mol
Refractive index (n_{D})	2.199

Structure
Crystal structure	Orthorhombic, oP12
Space group	Pnma (No. 62)
Lattice constant	a = 762.040 pm, b = 453.420 pm, c = 904.520 pm
Formula units (Z)	4

Thermochemistry
Std molar entropy (S^{⦵}_{298})	135.98 J K^{−1} mol^{−1}
Std enthalpy of formation (Δ_{f}H^{⦵}_{298})	−359.41 kJ/mol

Hazards
- GHS labelling
Pictograms	(GHS07: Exclamation mark) (GHS08: Health hazard) (GHS09: Environmental hazard)
Signal word	Danger
Hazard statements	H302, H332, H351, H360, H372, H410
Precautionary statements	P201, P261, P273, P304+P340, P308+P313, P312, P391
NFPA 704 (fire diamond)	3 0 0
- Lethal dose or concentration (LD, LC)
LD_{Lo} (lowest published)	140 mg/kg (guinea pig, oral)

Related compounds
Other anions	Lead(II) fluoride Lead(II) bromide Lead(II) iodide
Other cations	Lead(IV) chloride Tin(II) chloride Germanium(II) chloride
Related compounds	Thallium(I) chloride Bismuth chloride

Supplementary data page
- Lead(II) chloride (data page)
- Except where otherwise noted, data are given for materials in their standard state (at 25 °C [77 °F], 100 kPa). verify (what is ?) Infobox references

Lead(II) chloride (PbCl_{2}) is an inorganic compound which is a white solid under ambient conditions. It is poorly soluble in water. Lead(II) chloride is one of the most important lead-based reagents. It also occurs naturally in the form of the mineral cotunnite.

== Structure and properties ==
In solid PbCl_{2}, each lead ion is coordinated by nine chloride ions in a tricapped triangular prism formation — six lie at the vertices of a triangular prism and three lie beyond the centers of each rectangular prism face. The 9 chloride ions are not equidistant from the central lead atom, 7 lie at 280–309 pm and 2 at 370 pm. PbCl_{2} forms white orthorhombic needles.

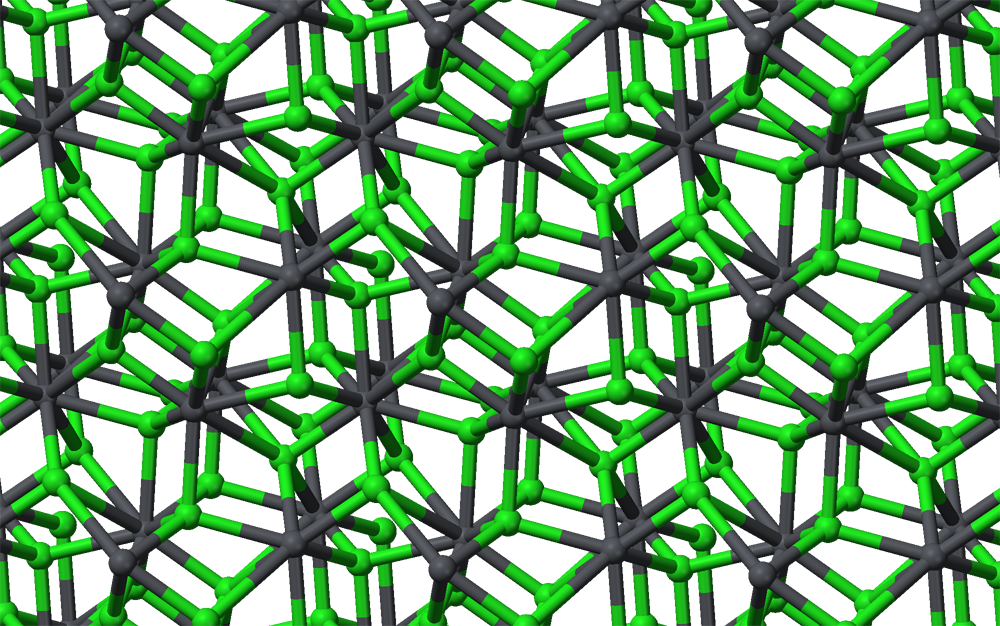
Ball-and-stick model of part of the crystal structure of cotunnite

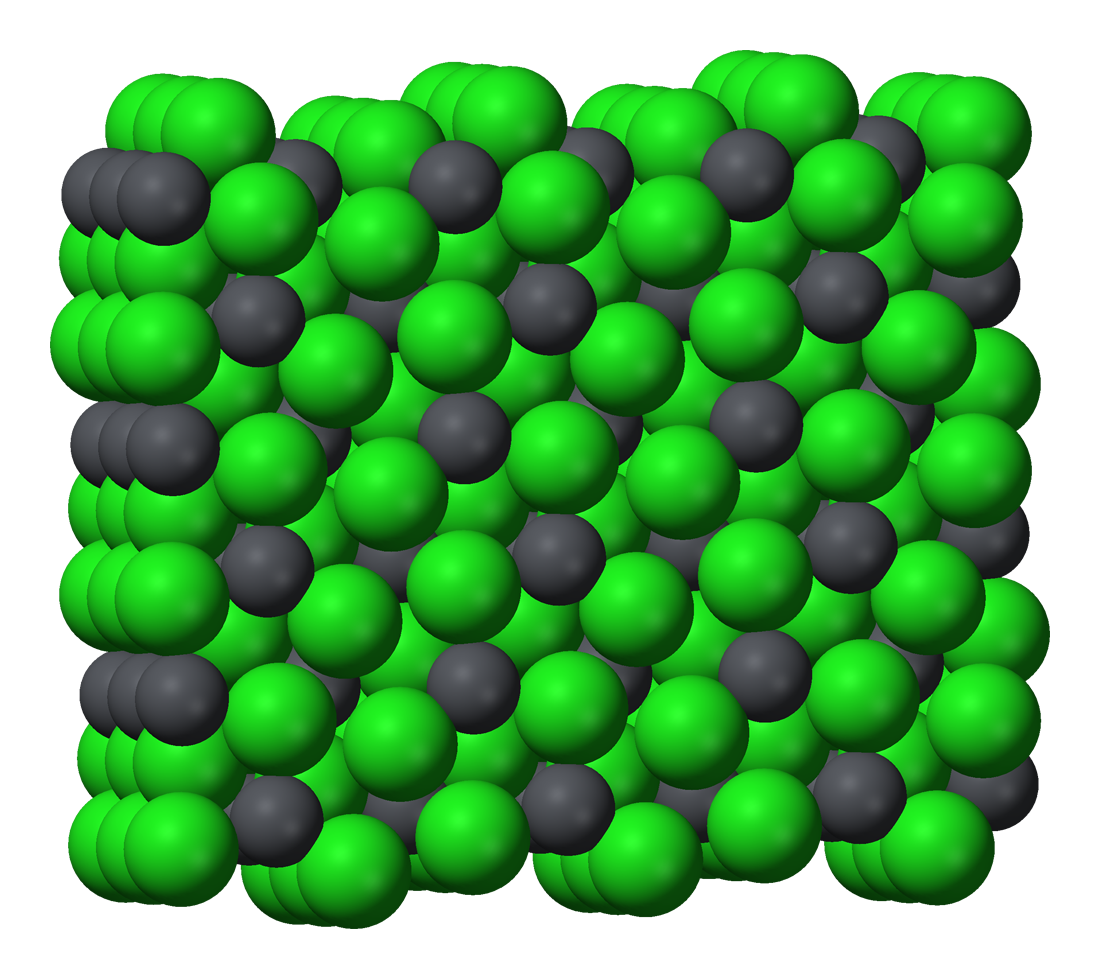
Space-filling model

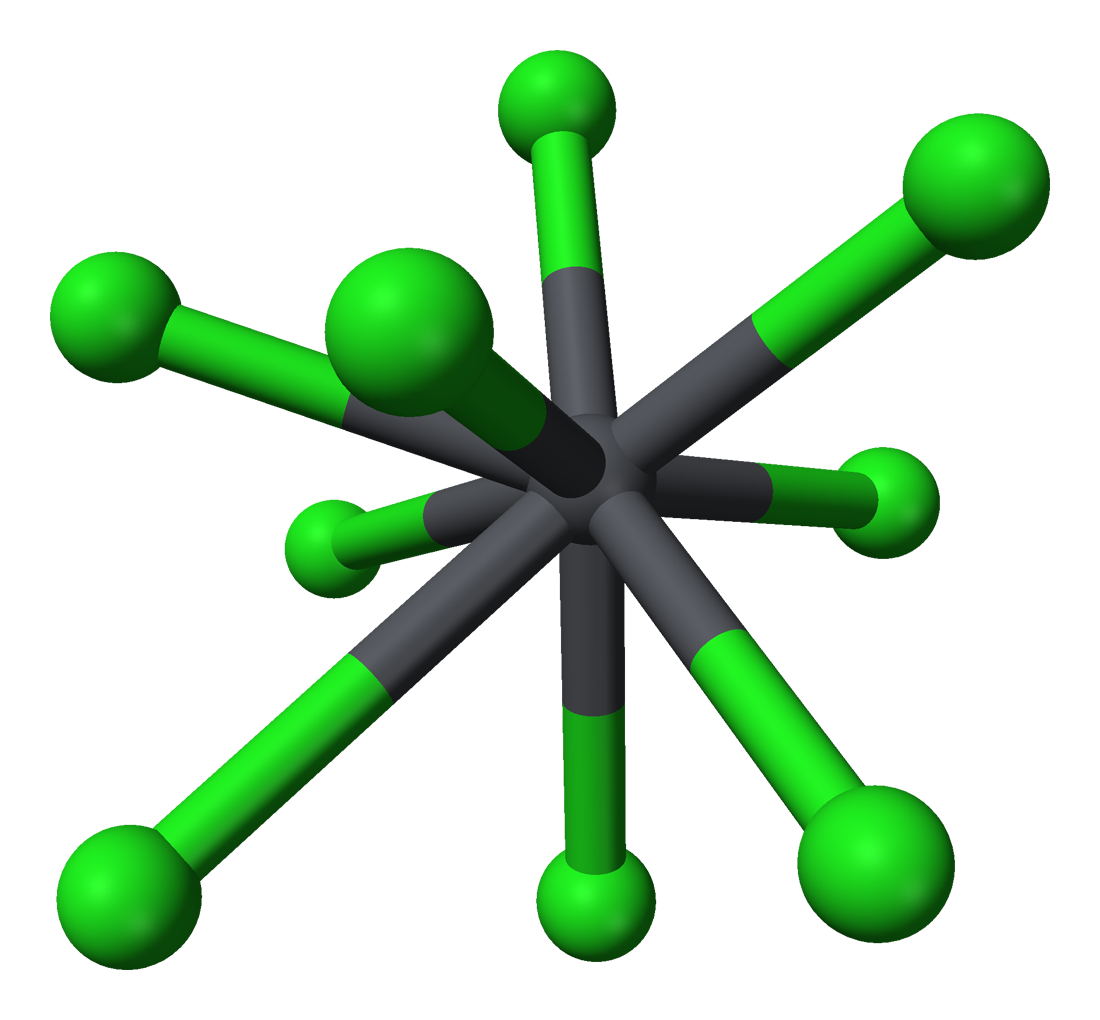
Coordination geometry of Pb^{2+}

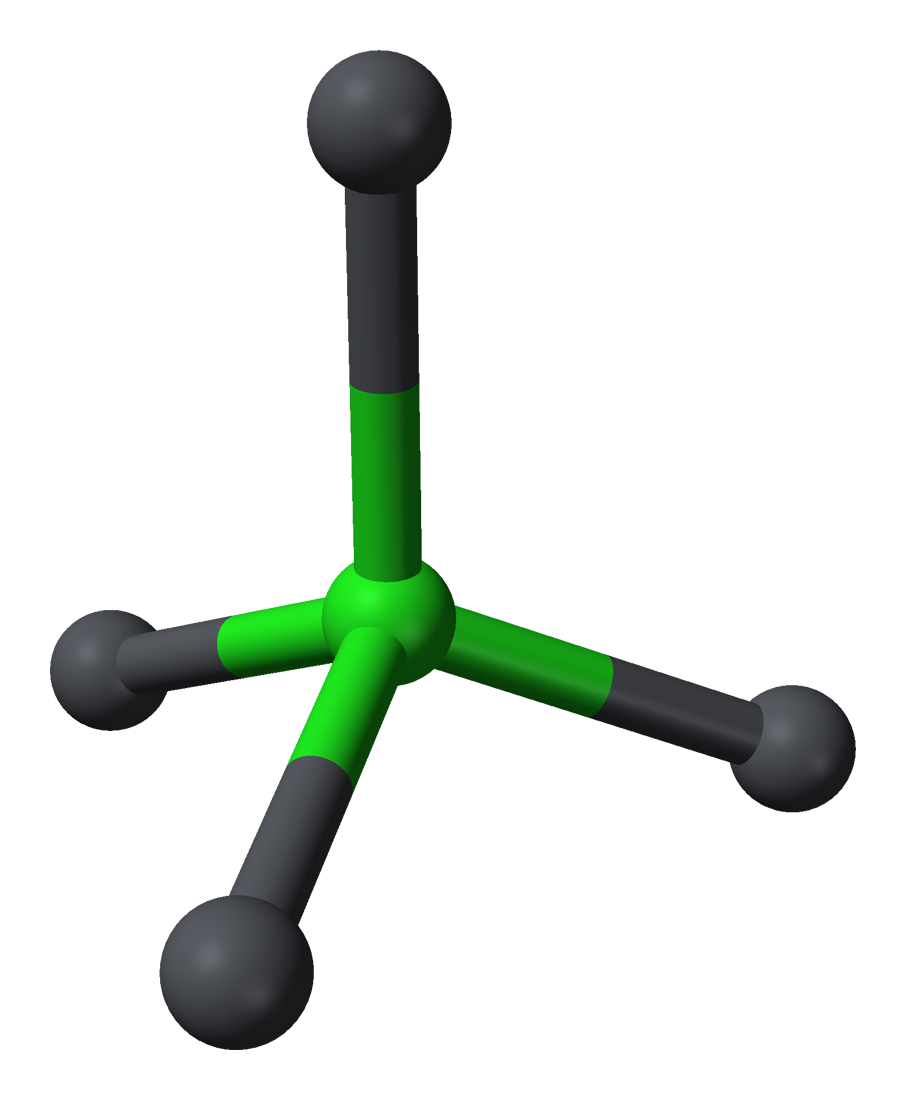
Coordination geometry of Cl^{−}

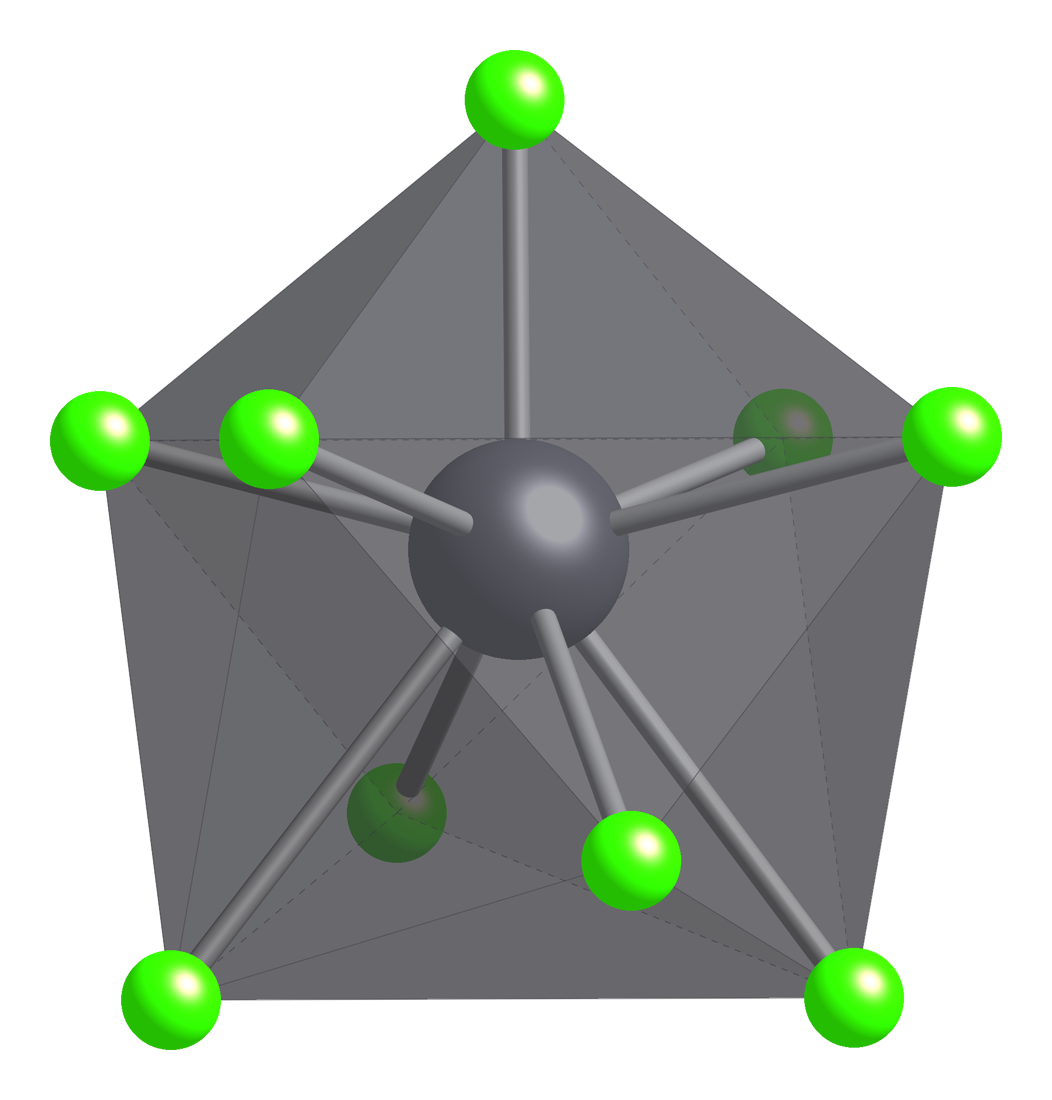
Coordination polyhedron of Pb^{2+}

In the gas phase, PbCl_{2} molecules have a bent structure with the Cl–Pb–Cl angle being 98° and each Pb–-Cl bond distance being 2.44 Å. Such PbCl_{2} is emitted from internal combustion engines that use ethylene chloride-tetraethyllead additives for antiknock purposes.

PbCl_{2} is sparingly soluble in water, solubility product K_{sp} = 1.7×10^{−5} at 20 °C. It is one of only 5 commonly water-insoluble chlorides, the other 4 being thallium(I) chloride, silver chloride (AgCl) with K_{sp} = 1.8×10^{−10}, copper(I) chloride (CuCl) with K_{sp} = 1.72×10^{−7} and mercury(I) chloride (Hg_{2}Cl_{2}) with K_{sp} = 1.3×10^{−18}.

== Synthesis ==
Solid lead(II) chloride precipitates upon addition of aqueous chloride sources (HCl, NaCl, KCl) to aqueous solutions of lead(II) compounds, such as lead(II) nitrate and lead(II) acetate:

Pb(NO_{3})_{2} + 2 HCl → PbCl_{2}(s) + 2 HNO_{3}

It also forms by treatment of basic lead(II) compounds such as Lead(II) oxide and lead(II) carbonate.

Lead dioxide is reduced by chloride as follows:

PbO_{2} + 4 HCl → PbCl_{2}(s) + Cl_{2} + 2 H_{2}O

It also formed by the oxidation of lead metal by copper(II) chloride:

Pb + CuCl_{2} → PbCl_{2} + Cu

Or most straightforwardly by the action of chlorine gas on lead metal:

Pb + Cl_{2} → PbCl_{2}

== Reactions ==
Addition of chloride ions to a suspension of PbCl_{2} gives rise to soluble complex ions. In these reactions the additional chloride (or other ligands) break up the chloride bridges that comprise the polymeric framework of solid PbCl_{2(s)}.

PbCl_{2(s)} + Cl^{−} → [PbCl_{3}]^{−}_{(aq)}
PbCl_{2(s)} + 2 Cl^{−} → [PbCl_{4}]^{2−}_{(aq)}

PbCl_{2} reacts with molten NaNO_{2} to give PbO:

PbCl_{2(l)} + 3 NaNO_{2} → PbO + NaNO_{3} + 2 NO + 2 NaCl

PbCl_{2} is used in synthesis of lead(IV) chloride (PbCl_{4}): Cl_{2} is bubbled through a saturated solution of PbCl_{2} in aqueous NH_{4}Cl forming [NH_{4}]_{2}[PbCl_{6}]. The latter is reacted with cold concentrated sulfuric acid (H_{2}SO_{4}) forming PbCl_{4} as an oil.

Lead(II) chloride is the main precursor for organometallic derivatives of lead, such as plumbocenes. The usual alkylating agents are employed, including Grignard reagents and organolithium compounds:

2 PbCl_{2} + 4 RLi → R_{4}Pb + 4 LiCl + Pb
2 PbCl_{2} + 4 RMgBr → R_{4}Pb + Pb + 4 MgBrCl
3 PbCl_{2} + 6 RMgBr → R_{3}Pb-PbR_{3} + Pb + 6 MgBrCl

These reactions produce derivatives that are more similar to organosilicon compounds, i.e. that Pb(II) tends to disproportionate upon alkylation.

PbCl_{2} can be used to produce PbO_{2} by treating it with sodium hypochlorite (NaClO), forming a reddish-brown precipitate of PbO_{2}.

== Uses ==
- Molten PbCl_{2} is used in the synthesis of lead titanate and barium lead titanate ceramics by cation replacement reactions:
  x PbCl_{2(l)} + BaTiO_{3(s)} → Ba_{1−x}Pb_{x}TiO_{3} + x BaCl_{2}
- PbCl_{2} is used in production of infrared transmitting glass, and ornamental glass called aurene glass. Aurene glass has an iridescent surface formed by spraying with PbCl_{2} and reheating under controlled conditions. Stannous chloride (SnCl_{2}) is used for the same purpose.
- Pb is used in HCl service even though the PbCl_{2} formed is slightly soluble in HCl. Addition of 6–25% of antimony (Sb) increases corrosion resistance.
- A basic chloride of lead, PbCl_{2}·Pb(OH)_{2}, is known as Pattinson's white lead and is used as pigment in white paint. Lead paint is now banned as a health hazard in many countries by the White Lead (Painting) Convention, 1921.
- PbCl_{2} is an intermediate in refining bismuth (Bi) ore. The ore containing Bi, Pb, and Zn is first treated with molten caustic soda to remove traces of arsenic and tellurium. This is followed by the Parkes process to remove any silver and gold present. There are now Bi, Pb, and Zn in the ore. At 500 °C, it receives treatment from Cl_{2} gas. First, ZnCl_{2} forms and is excreted. Pure Bi is left behind after PbCl_{2} forms and is eliminated. Lastly, BiCl_{3} would form.

== Toxicity ==
Like other soluble lead compounds, exposure to PbCl_{2} may cause lead poisoning.
