= Lead(II) bromide =

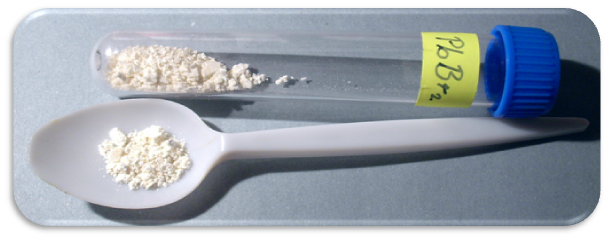
- Lead(II) bromide

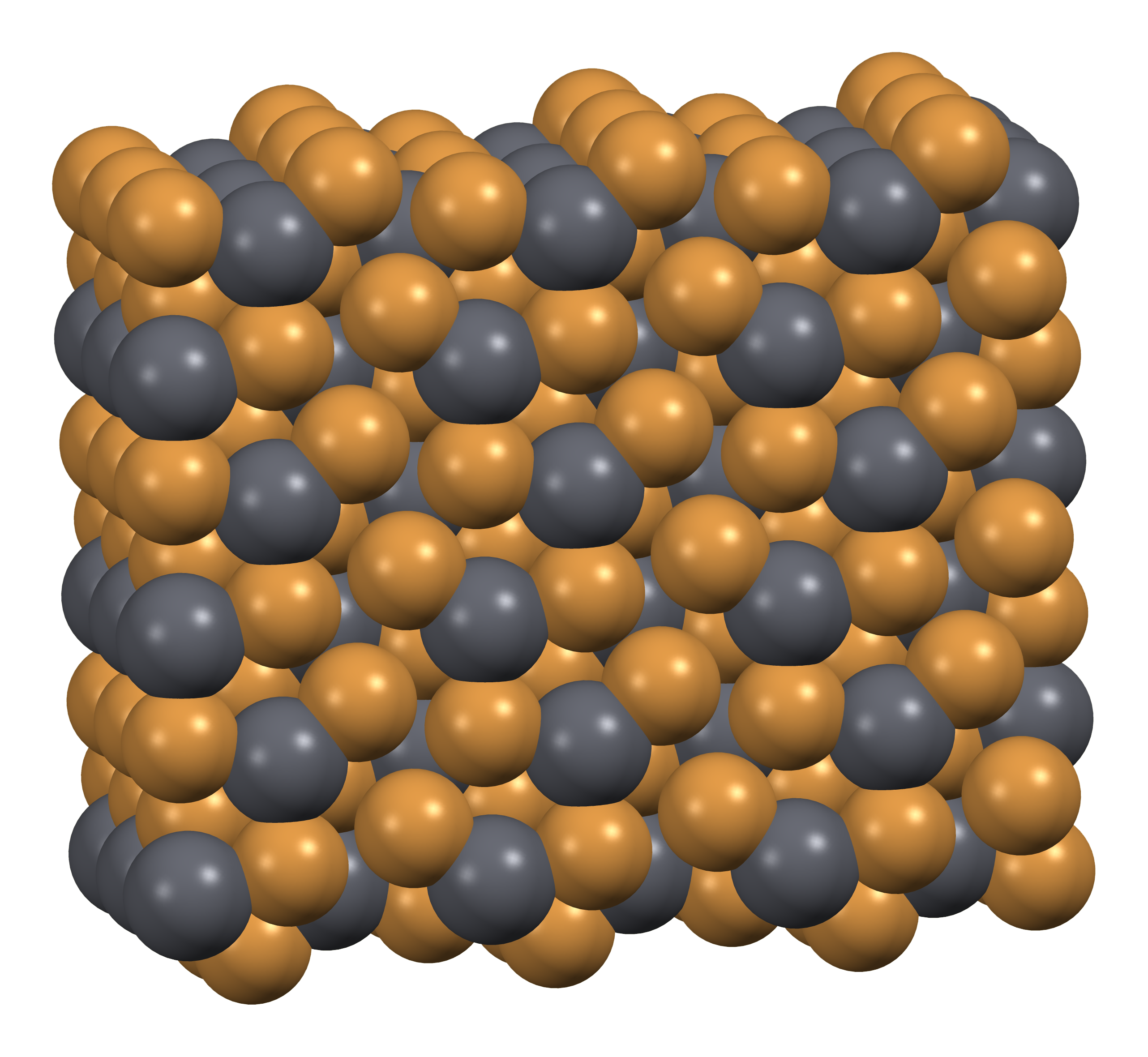

Names
- IUPAC name Lead(II) bromide
- Other names Lead dibromide

Identifiers
CAS Number	10031-22-8
3D model (JSmol)	Interactive image
ChemSpider	23216
ECHA InfoCard	100.030.065
EC Number	233-084-4
PubChem CID	24831
UNII	1O767M99U7
CompTox Dashboard (EPA)	DTXSID701014306
- InChI: InChI=1S/2BrH.Pb/h2*1H;/q;;+2/p-2 Key: ZASWJUOMEGBQCQ-UHFFFAOYSA-L
- SMILES: Br[Pb]Br

Properties
Chemical formula	PbBr_{2}
Molar mass	367.01 g/mol
Appearance	white powder
Density	6.66 g/cm^{3}
Melting point	370.6 °C (699.1 °F; 643.8 K)
Boiling point	916 °C (1,681 °F; 1,189 K) (vaporizes)
Solubility in water	0.455 g/100 mL (0 °C); 0.973 g/100 mL (20 °C); 4.41 g/100 mL (100 °C)
Solubility product (K_{sp})	1.86 × 10^{−5} (20 °C)
Solubility	insoluble in alcohol; soluble in ammonia, alkali, KBr, NaBr
Magnetic susceptibility (χ)	−90.6·10^{−6} cm^{3}/mol

Structure
Crystal structure	PbCl_{2} type (orthorhombic)
Space group	Pnma (No. 62)
Lattice constant	a = 805.90 pm, b = 954.0 pm, c = 473.19 pm
Formula units (Z)	4

Hazards
- GHS labelling
Pictograms	(GHS07: Exclamation mark) (GHS08: Health hazard) (GHS09: Environmental hazard)
Signal word	Danger
Hazard statements	H302, H332, H360, H373, H410
Precautionary statements	P201, P202, P260, P264, P270, P271, P273, P281, P301+P312, P304+P312, P304+P340, P308+P313, P312, P314, P330, P391, P405, P501
NFPA 704 (fire diamond)	3 0 0

Related compounds
Other anions	Lead(II) fluoride, Lead(II) chloride, Lead(II) iodide
Other cations	Thallium(I) bromide, Tin(II) bromide Bismuth bromide
- Except where otherwise noted, data are given for materials in their standard state (at 25 °C [77 °F], 100 kPa). verify (what is ?) Infobox references

Lead(II) bromide is the inorganic compound with the formula PbBr_{2}. It is a white powder. It is produced in the burning of typical leaded gasolines.

== Preparation and properties ==
It is typically prepared from treating solutions of lead salts (e.g., (lead(II) nitrate) with bromide salts. This process exploits its low solubility in water - only 0.455 g dissolves in 100 g of water at 0 °C. It is about ten times more soluble in boiling water.

PbBr_{2} has the same crystal structure as lead chloride (cotunnite) – they are isomorphous. In this structure, Pb^{2+} is surrounded by nine Br^{−} ions in a distorted tricapped trigonal prismatic geometry. Seven of the Pb-Br distances are shorter, in the range 2.9-3.3 Å, while two of them are longer at 3.9 Å. The coordination is therefore sometimes described as (7+2).

Lead bromide was prevalent in the environment as the result of the use of leaded gasoline. Tetraethyl lead was once widely used to improve the combustion properties of gasoline. To prevent the resulting lead oxides from fouling the engine, gasoline was treated with 1,2-Dibromoethane, which converted lead oxides into the more volatile lead bromide, which was then exhausted from the engine into the environment.

== Safety ==
Like other compounds containing lead, lead(II) bromide is categorized as probably carcinogenic to humans (Category 2A), by the International Agency for Research on Cancer (IARC). Its release into the environment as a product of leaded gasoline was highly controversial.
