= Lead(II) fluoride =

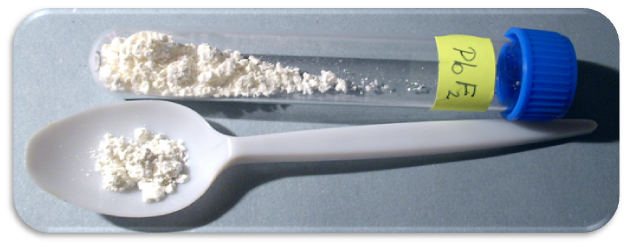

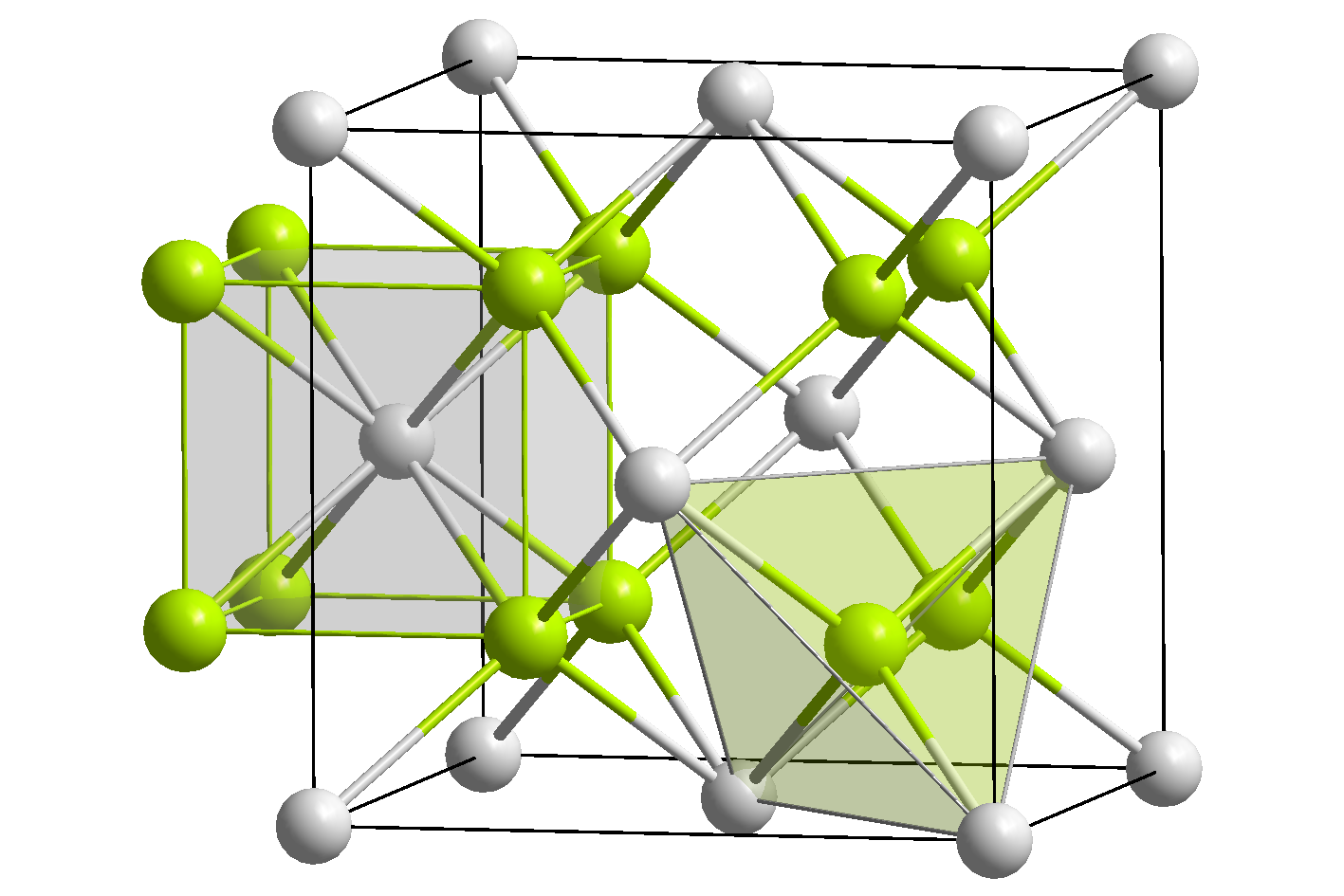

Names
- Other names Lead difluoride plumbous fluoride

Identifiers
CAS Number	7783-46-2
3D model (JSmol)	Interactive image
ChemSpider	22955
ECHA InfoCard	100.029.089
PubChem CID	124123
UNII	291824BBS4
CompTox Dashboard (EPA)	DTXSID901014471 DTXSID60896961, DTXSID901014471
- InChI: InChI=1S/2FH.Pb/h2*1H;/q;;+2/p-2 Key: FPHIOHCCQGUGKU-UHFFFAOYSA-L
- SMILES: F[Pb]F

Properties
Chemical formula	PbF_{2}
Molar mass	245.20 g/mol
Appearance	white powder
Odor	odorless
Density	8.445 g/cm^{3} (orthorhombic); 7.750 g/cm^{3} (cubic)
Melting point	824 °C (1,515 °F; 1,097 K)
Boiling point	1,293 °C (2,359 °F; 1,566 K)
Solubility in water	0.057 g/100 mL (0 °C); 0.0671 g/100 mL (20 °C)
Solubility product (K_{sp})	2.05·10^{−8} (20 °C)
Solubility	soluble in nitric acid and hydrochloric acid; insoluble in acetone and ammonia
Magnetic susceptibility (χ)	−58.1·10^{−6} cm^{3}/mol

Structure
Crystal structure	Fluorite (cubic), cF12
Space group	Fm3̅m, No. 225

Hazards
- Lethal dose or concentration (LD, LC)
LD_{50} (median dose)	3031 mg/kg (oral, rat)

Related compounds
Other anions	Lead(II) chloride Lead(II) bromide Lead(II) iodide
Other cations	Difluorocarbene; Difluorosilylene; Difluorogermylene; Stannous fluoride
- Except where otherwise noted, data are given for materials in their standard state (at 25 °C [77 °F], 100 kPa). verify (what is ?) Infobox references

Lead(II) fluoride is the inorganic compound with the formula PbF_{2}. It is a white solid. The compound is polymorphic, at ambient temperatures it exists in orthorhombic (PbCl_{2} type) form, while at high temperatures it is cubic (Fluorite type).

== Preparation ==
Lead(II) fluoride can be prepared by treating lead(II) hydroxide or lead(II) carbonate with hydrofluoric acid:

Pb(OH)_{2} + 2 HF → PbF_{2} + 2 H_{2}O

Alternatively, it is precipitated by adding hydrofluoric acid to a lead(II) salt solution, or by adding a fluoride salt to a lead salt, such as potassium fluoride to a lead(II) nitrate solution,

2 KF + Pb(NO_{3})_{2} → PbF_{2} + 2 KNO_{3}

or sodium fluoride to a lead(II) acetate solution.

2 NaF + Pb(CH_{3}COO)_{2} → PbF_{2} + 2 NaCH_{3}COO

It appears as the very rare mineral fluorocronite.

== Uses ==
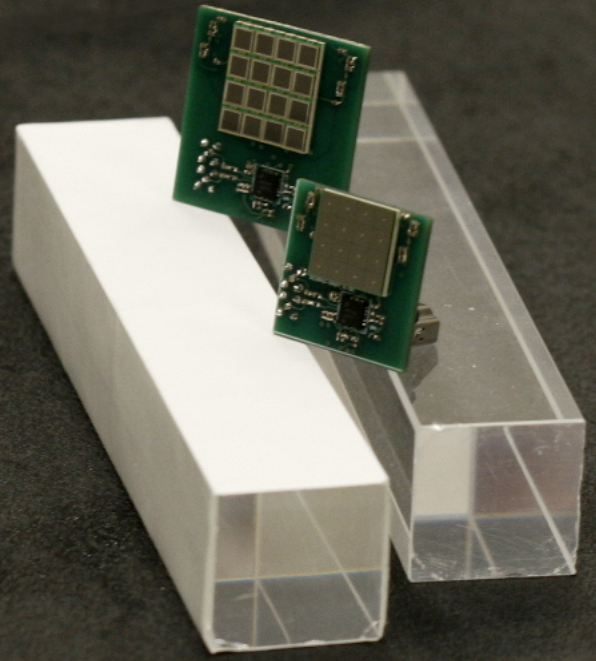
Two 25 mm × 25 mm × 140 mm PbF_{2} scintillator crystals used in the Muon g−2 experiment.

Lead(II) fluoride is used in low melting glasses, in glass coatings to reflect infrared rays, in phosphors for television-tube screens, and as a catalyst for the manufacture of picoline. The Muon g−2 experiment uses PbF_{2} crystals in conjunction with silicon photomultipliers. High energy charged particles create Cerenkov light as they pass through the crystals, which is measured by the silicon photomultipliers.

It also serves as an oxygen scavenger in high-temperature fluorine chemistry, as plumbous oxide is relatively volatile.
