= Lead carbonate =

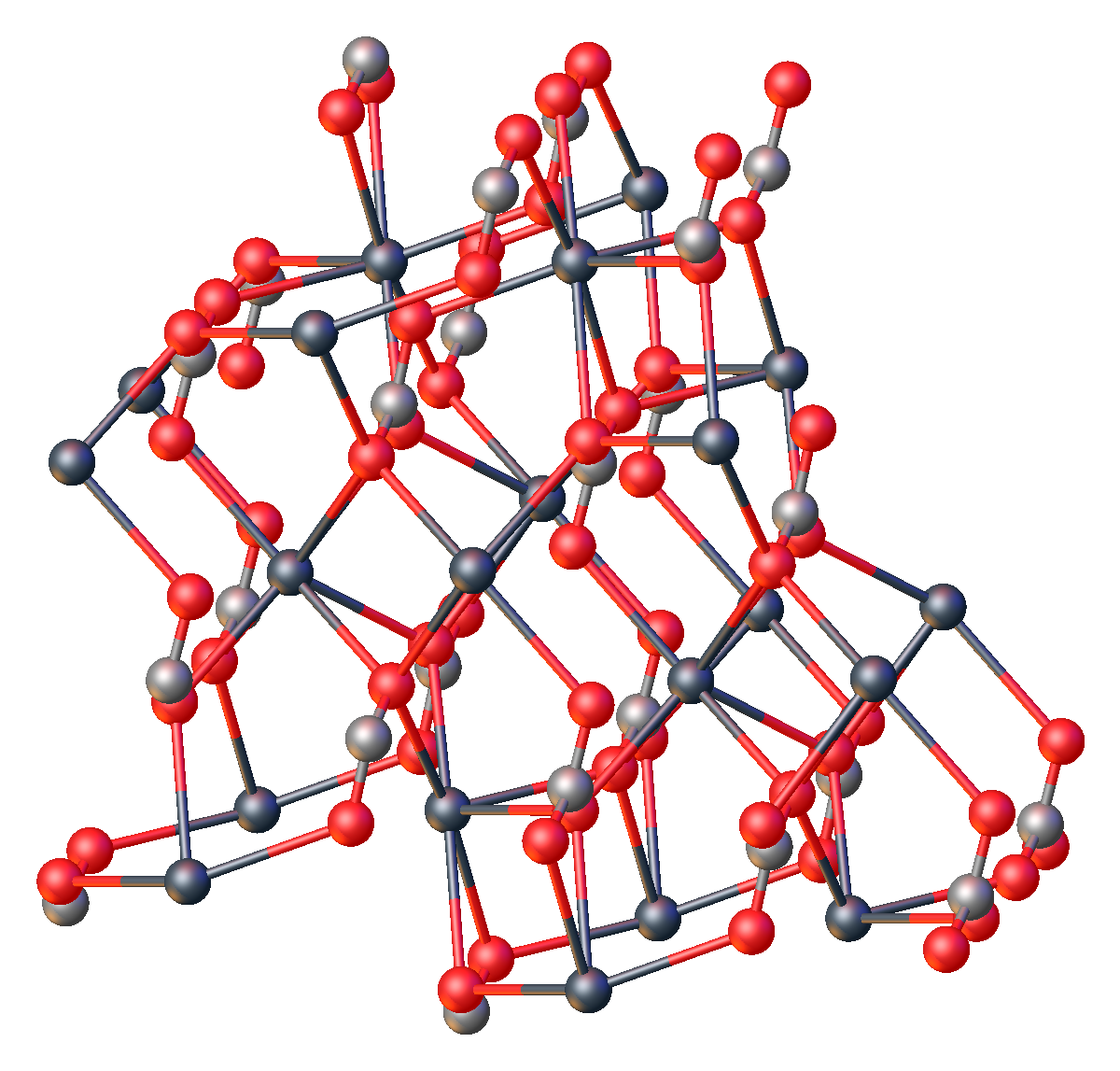

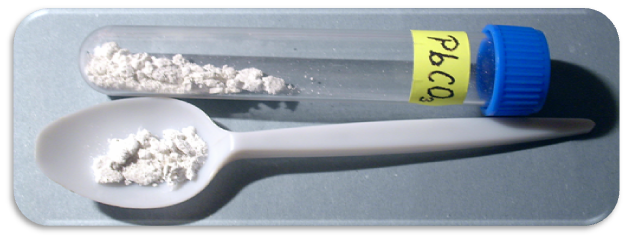

Names
- IUPAC name Lead(II) carbonate
- Other names Cerussite

Identifiers
CAS Number	598-63-0
3D model (JSmol)	Interactive image
ChemSpider	11234
ECHA InfoCard	100.009.041
EC Number	209-943-4
PubChem CID	11727
RTECS number	OF9275000
UNII	43M0P24L2B
CompTox Dashboard (EPA)	DTXSID90883460
- InChI: InChI=1S/CH2O3.Pb/c2-1(3)4;/h(H2,2,3,4);/q;+2/p-2 Key: MFEVGQHCNVXMER-UHFFFAOYSA-L
- SMILES: C(=O)([O-])[O-].[Pb+2]

Properties
Chemical formula	PbCO_{3}
Molar mass	267.21 g/mol
Appearance	White powder
Density	6.582 g/cm^{3}
Melting point	315 °C (599 °F; 588 K) (decomposes)
Solubility in water	0.00011 g/(100 mL) (20 °C)
Solubility product (K_{sp})	1.46·10^{−13}
Solubility	insoluble in alcohol, ammonia; soluble in acid, alkali
Magnetic susceptibility (χ)	−61.2·10^{−6} cm^{3}/mol
Refractive index (n_{D})	1.804

Hazards
- GHS labelling
Pictograms	(GHS07: Exclamation mark) (GHS08: Health hazard) (GHS09: Environmental hazard)
Signal word	Danger
Hazard statements	H302, H332, H360, H373, H410
Precautionary statements	P201, P202, P260, P264, P270, P271, P273, P281, P301+P312, P304+P312, P304+P340, P308+P313, P312, P314, P330, P391, P405, P501
Flash point	Non-flammable
Safety data sheet (SDS)	External MSDS
- Except where otherwise noted, data are given for materials in their standard state (at 25 °C [77 °F], 100 kPa). verify (what is ?) Infobox references

Lead(II) carbonate is the chemical compound with the chemical formula PbCO_{3}. It is a white, toxic solid. It occurs naturally as the mineral cerussite.

== Structure ==
Like all metal carbonates, lead(II) carbonate adopts a dense, highly crosslinked structure consisting of intact CO^{2−}_{3} and metal cation sites. As verified by X-ray crystallography, the Pb(II) centers are seven-coordinate, being surrounded by multiple carbonate ligands. The carbonate centers are bonded bidentate to a single Pb and bridge to five other Pb sites.

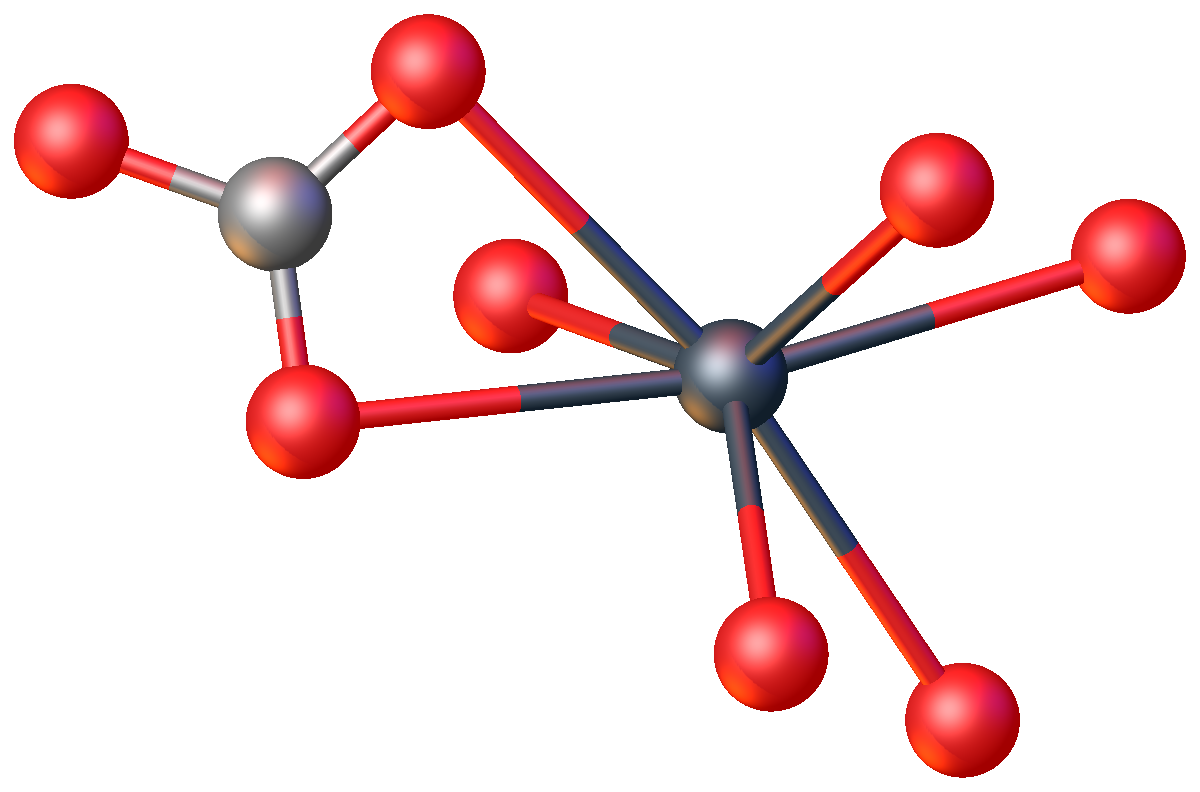
Pb site in PbCO_{3}, highlighting seven-coordination and the presence of one bidentate carbonate ligand for each Pb center.

== Production and use ==
Lead carbonate is manufactured by passing carbon dioxide into a cold dilute solution of lead(II) acetate, or by shaking a suspension of a lead salt more soluble than the carbonate with ammonium carbonate at a low temperature to avoid formation of basic lead carbonate.

Pb(CH_{3}COO)_{2} + [NH_{4}]_{2}CO_{3} → PbCO_{3} + 2 [NH_{4}](CH_{3}COO)

Lead carbonate is used as a catalyst to polymerize formaldehyde to poly(oxymethylene). It improves the bonding of chloroprene to wire.

== Regulations ==
The supply and use of this compound is restricted in Europe.

== Other lead carbonates ==
A number of lead carbonates are known:

- White lead, a basic lead carbonate, 2PbCO_{3}·Pb(OH)_{2}
- Shannonite, PbCO_{3}·PbO
- Plumbonacrite, 3PbCO_{3}·Pb(OH)_{2}·PbO
- PbCO_{3}·2PbO
- Abellaite, NaPb_{2}(OH)(CO_{3})_{2}
- Leadhillite, 2PbCO_{3}·PbSO_{4}·Pb(OH)_{2}
