= Lead(II) iodide =

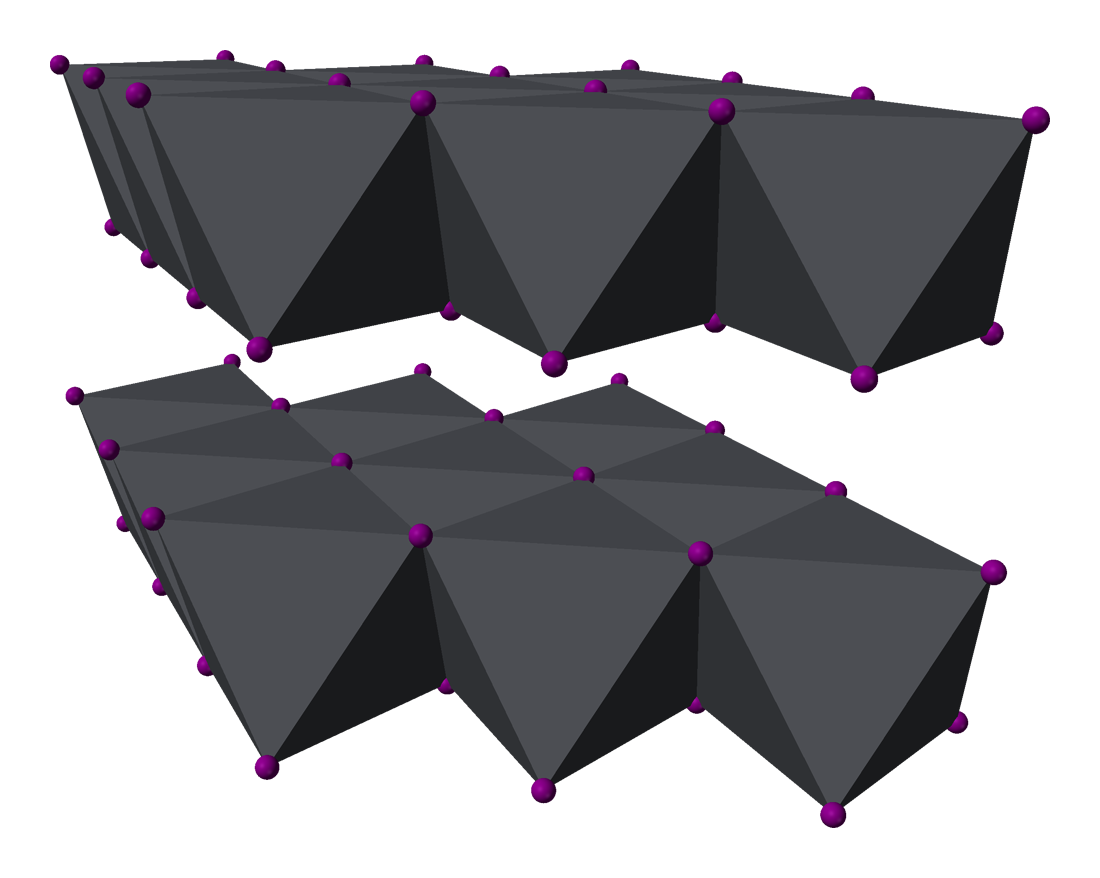
- Lead(II) iodide

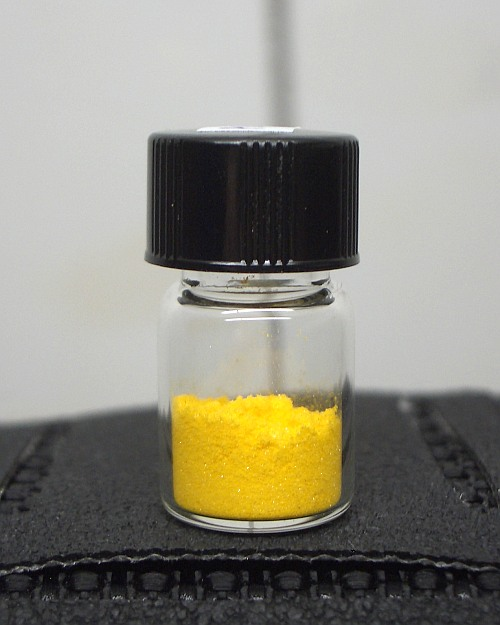

Names
- Other names Plumbous iodide

Identifiers
CAS Number	10101-63-0
3D model (JSmol)	Interactive image
ChemSpider	23305
ECHA InfoCard	100.030.220
EC Number	233-256-9
PubChem CID	24931
UNII	OTL90F2GLT
UN number	2291 3077
CompTox Dashboard (EPA)	DTXSID101014310
- InChI: InChI=1S/2HI.Pb/h2*1H;/q;;+2/p-2 Key: RQQRAHKHDFPBMC-UHFFFAOYSA-L; InChI=1/2HI.Pb/h2*1H;/q;;+2/p-2 Key: RQQRAHKHDFPBMC-NUQVWONBAP
- SMILES: I[Pb]I

Properties
Chemical formula	PbI_{2}
Molar mass	461.01 g/mol
Appearance	bright yellow powder
Odor	odorless
Density	6.16 g/cm^{3}
Melting point	410 °C (770 °F; 683 K)
Boiling point	872 °C (1,602 °F; 1,145 K) decomp.
Solubility in water	0.44 g/L (0 °C); 0.76 g/L (20 °C); 4.1 g/L (100 °C)
Solubility product (K_{sp})	4.41×10^{−9} (20 °C)
Solubility	insoluble in ethanol, cold HCl; soluble in alkalis, KI solution, methyl isopropyl ketone
Band gap	2.34 eV (direct)
Magnetic susceptibility (χ)	−126.5·10^{−6} cm^{3}/mol

Structure
Crystal structure	Hexagonal hP6
Space group	P6_{3}mc, No. 186
Lattice constant	a = 0.4556 nm, b = 0.4556 nm, c = 1.3973 nm α = 90°, β = 90°, γ = 120°°
Formula units (Z)	2
Coordination geometry	octahedral

Thermochemistry
Heat capacity (C)	77.4 J/(mol·K)
Std molar entropy (S^{⦵}_{298})	174.9 J/(mol·K)
Std enthalpy of formation (Δ_{f}H^{⦵}_{298})	−175.5 kJ/mol
Gibbs free energy (Δ_{f}G^{⦵})	−173.6 kJ/mol

Hazards
- GHS labelling
Pictograms	(GHS07: Exclamation mark) (GHS08: Health hazard) (GHS09: Environmental hazard)
Signal word	Danger
Hazard statements	H302, H332, H360, H373, H410
Precautionary statements	P201, P202, P260, P264, P270, P271, P273, P281, P301+P312, P304+P312, P304+P340, P308+P313, P312, P314, P330, P391, P405, P501
NFPA 704 (fire diamond)	3 0 0
Flash point	Non-flammable

Related compounds
Other anions	Lead(II) fluoride; Lead(II) chloride; Lead(II) bromide
Other cations	Tin(II) iodide
Related compounds	Thallium(I) iodide; Bismuth(III) iodide
- Except where otherwise noted, data are given for materials in their standard state (at 25 °C [77 °F], 100 kPa). verify (what is ?) Infobox references

Lead(II) iodide (or lead iodide) is a chemical compound with the formula PbI_{2}. At room temperature, it is a bright yellow odorless crystalline solid, that becomes orange and red when heated. It was formerly called plumbous iodide.

The compound currently has a few specialized applications, such as the manufacture of solar cells, X-rays and gamma-ray detectors. Its preparation is used in chemistry education to teach topics such as precipitation reactions and stoichiometry. It is decomposed by light at temperatures above 125 °C (257 °F), and this effect has been used in a patented photographic process.

Lead iodide was formerly employed as a yellow pigment in some paints, with the name iodide yellow. However, that use has been largely discontinued due to its toxicity and poor stability.

== Preparation ==
PbI_{2} is commonly synthesized via a precipitation reaction between iodide and lead(II) in aqueous solution:

Pb^{2+} + 2 I^{−} → PbI_{2}

The lead iodide PbI_{2} is nearly insoluble at room temperature, and thus precipitates out.

Other soluble compounds containing lead(II) and iodide can be used instead, for example lead(II) acetate and sodium iodide.

The compound can also be synthesized by reacting iodine vapor with molten lead between 500 and 700 °C.

A thin film of PbI_{2} can also be prepared by depositing a film of lead sulfide PbS and exposing it to iodine vapor, by the reaction

PbS + I_{2} → PbI_{2} + S

The sulfur is then washed with dimethyl sulfoxide.

== Crystallization ==
Lead iodide prepared from cold solutions usually consists of many small hexagonal platelets, giving the yellow precipitate a silky appearance. Larger crystals can be obtained by exploiting the fact that solubility of lead iodide in water (like those of lead chloride and lead bromide) increases dramatically with temperature. The compound is colorless when dissolved in hot water, but crystallizes on cooling as thin but visibly larger bright yellow flakes, that settle slowly through the liquid — a visual effect often described as "golden rain". Larger crystals can be obtained by autoclaving the PbI_{2} with water under pressure at 200 °C.

Even larger crystals can be obtained by slowing down the common reaction. A simple setup is to submerge two beakers containing the concentrated reactants in a larger container of water, taking care to avoid currents. As the two substances diffuse through the water and meet, they slowly react and deposit the iodide in the space between the beakers.

Another similar method is to react the two substances in a gel medium, that slows down the diffusion and supports the growing crystal away from the container's walls. Patel and Rao have used this method to grow crystals up to 30 mm in diameter and 2 mm thick.

The reaction can be slowed also by separating the two reagents with a permeable membrane. This approach, with a cellulose membrane, was used in September 1988 to study the growth of PbI_{2} crystals in zero gravity, in an experiment flown on the Space Shuttle Discovery.

PbI_{2} can also be crystallized from powder by sublimation at 390 °C, in near vacuum or in a current of argon with some hydrogen.

Large high-purity crystals can be obtained by zone melting or by the Bridgman–Stockbarger technique. These processes can remove various impurities from commercial PbI_{2}.

== Applications ==
Lead iodide is a precursor material in the fabrication of highly efficient Perovskite solar cell. Typically, a solution of PbI_{2} in an organic solvent, such as dimethylformamide or dimethylsulfoxide, is applied over a titanium dioxide layer by spin coating. The layer is then treated with a solution of methylammonium iodide CH_{3}NH_{3}I and annealed, turning it into the double salt methylammonium lead iodide CH_{3}NH_{3}PbI_{3}, with a perovskite structure. The reaction changes the film's color from yellow to light brown.

PbI_{2} is also used as a high-energy photon detector for gamma-rays and X-rays, due to its wide band gap which ensures low noise operation.

Lead iodide was formerly used as a paint pigment under the name "iodine yellow". It was described by Prosper Mérimée (1830) as "not yet much known in commerce, is as bright as orpiment or chromate of lead. It is thought to be more permanent; but time only can prove its pretension to so essential a quality. It is prepared by precipitating a solution of acetate or nitrate of lead, with potassium iodide: the nitrate produces a more brilliant yellow color." However, due to the toxicity and instability of the compound it is no longer used as such. It may still be used in art for bronzing and in gold-like mosaic tiles.

== Stability ==
Common material characterization techniques such as electron microscopy can damage samples of lead(II) iodide. Thin films of lead(II) iodide are unstable in ambient air. Ambient air oxygen oxidizes iodide into elemental iodine:

2 PbI_{2} + O_{2} → 2 PbO + 2 I_{2}↑

== Toxicity ==
Lead iodide is very toxic to human health. Ingestion will cause many acute and chronic consequences characteristic of lead poisoning. Lead iodide has been found to be a carcinogen in animals suggesting the same may hold true in humans. Lead iodide is an inhalation hazard, and appropriate respirators should be used when handling powders of lead iodide.

== Structure ==
The structure of PbI_{2}, as determined by X-ray powder diffraction, is primarily hexagonal close-packed system with alternating between layers of lead atoms and iodide atoms, with largely ionic bonding. Weak van der Waals interactions have been observed between lead–iodide layers. The most common stacking forms are 2H and 4H. The 4H polymorph is most common in samples grown from the melt, by precipitation, or by sublimation, whereas the 2H polymorph is usually formed by sol-gel synthesis. The solid can also take an R6 rhombohedral structure.

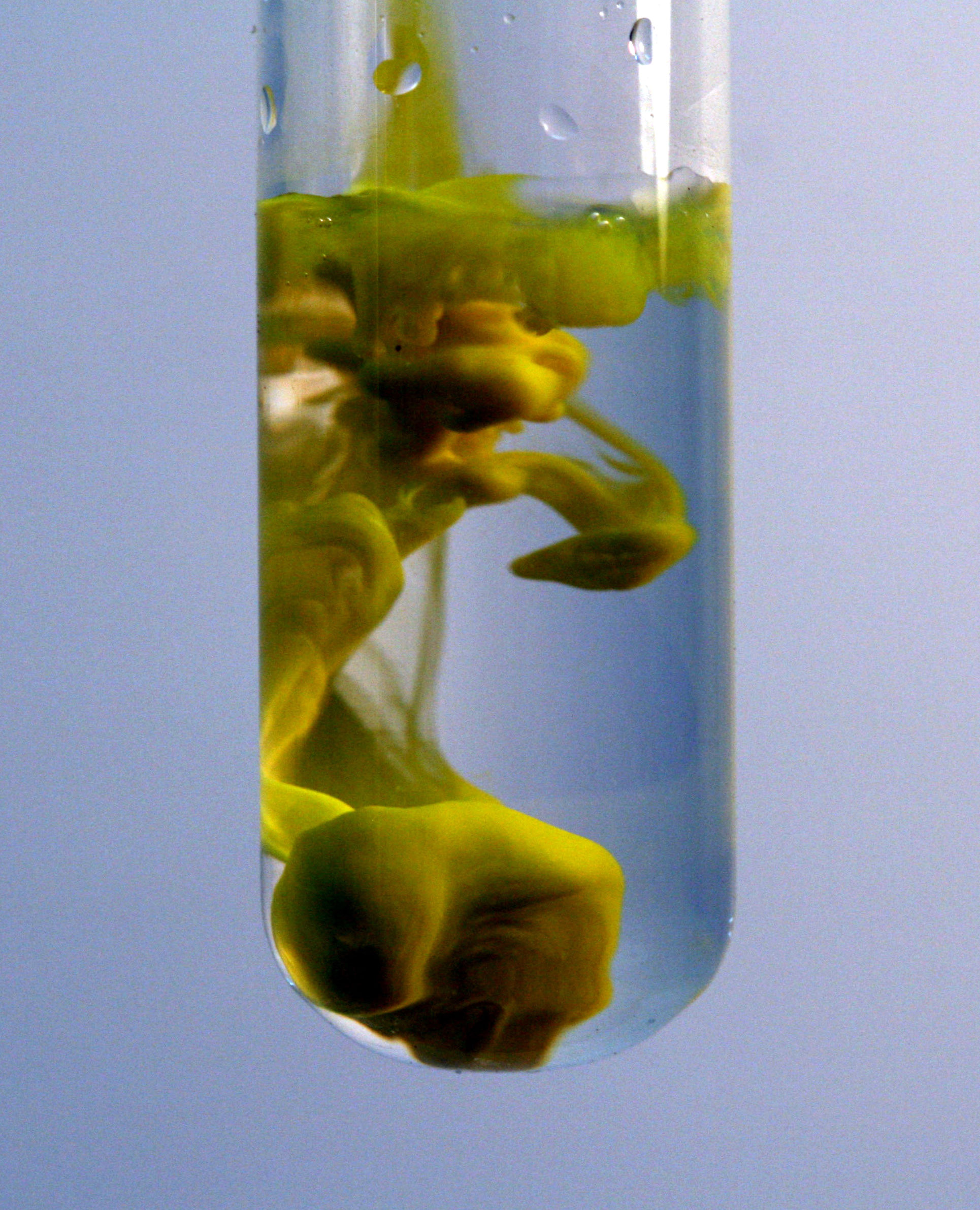
Lead(II) iodide precipitates when solutions of potassium iodide and lead(II) nitrate are combined

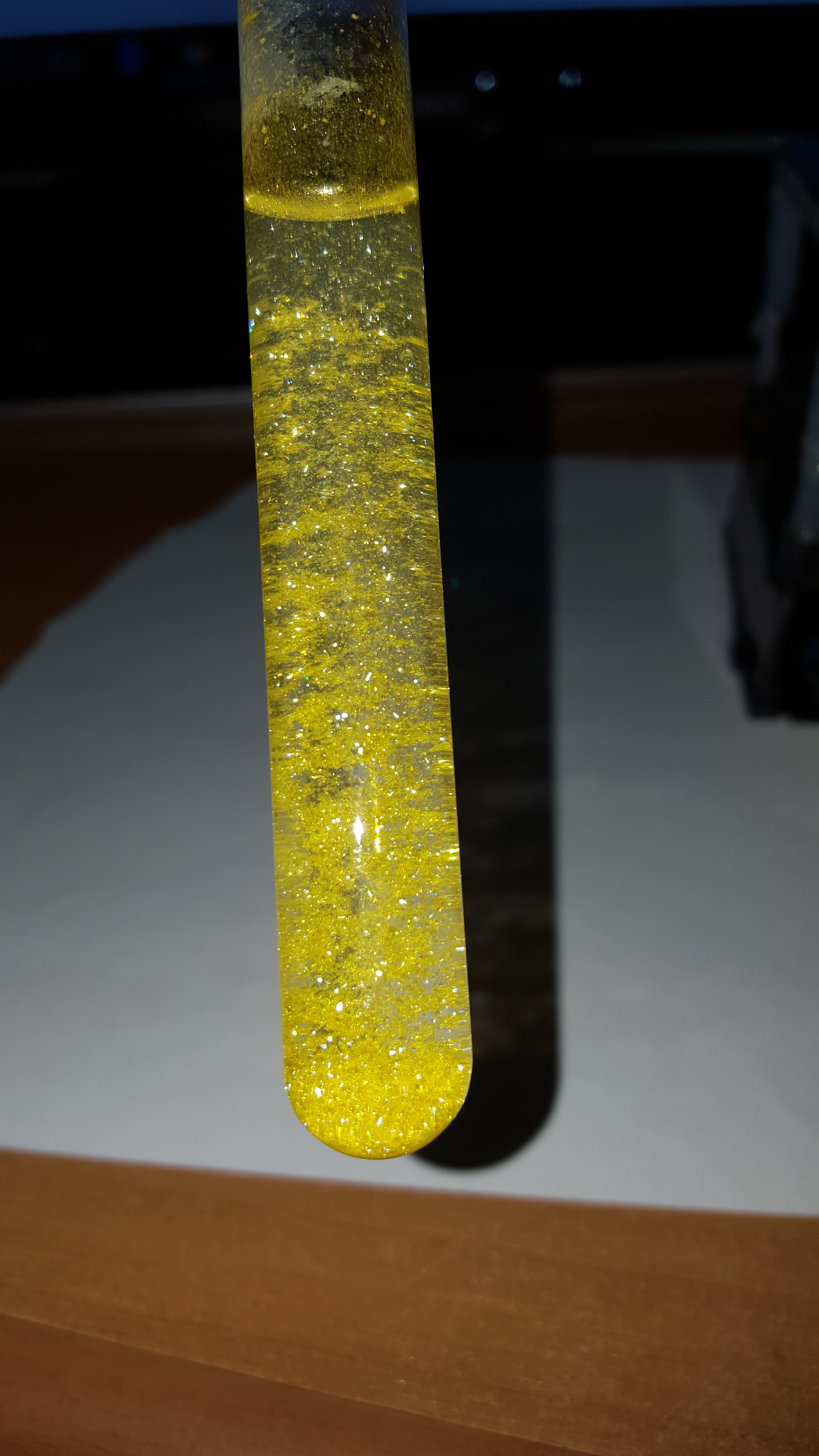
Experiment "golden rain" where iodide of lead(II) was recrystallized from hot solution by cooling, forming crystals of golden-yellow

== See also ==
- Lead(II) bromide
- Lead(II) chloride
- Tin(II) iodide
- Bridgman–Stockbarger technique

== Cited sources ==
- Haynes, William M., ed. (2016). CRC Handbook of Chemistry and Physics (97th ed.). CRC Press. ISBN 978-1-4987-5429-3.
