= Pyroclastic rock =

Clastic rocks composed solely or primarily of volcanic materials

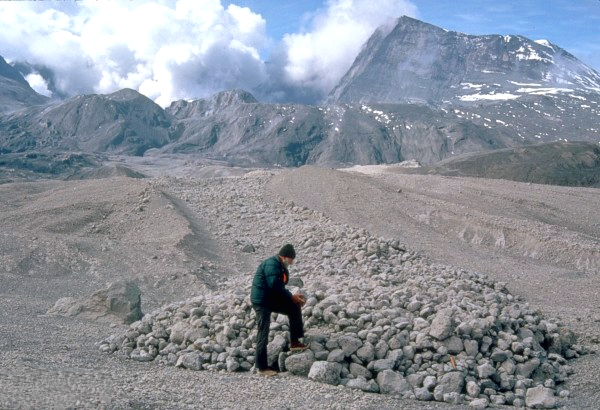
USGS scientist examines pumice blocks at the edge of a pyroclastic flow from Mount St. Helens

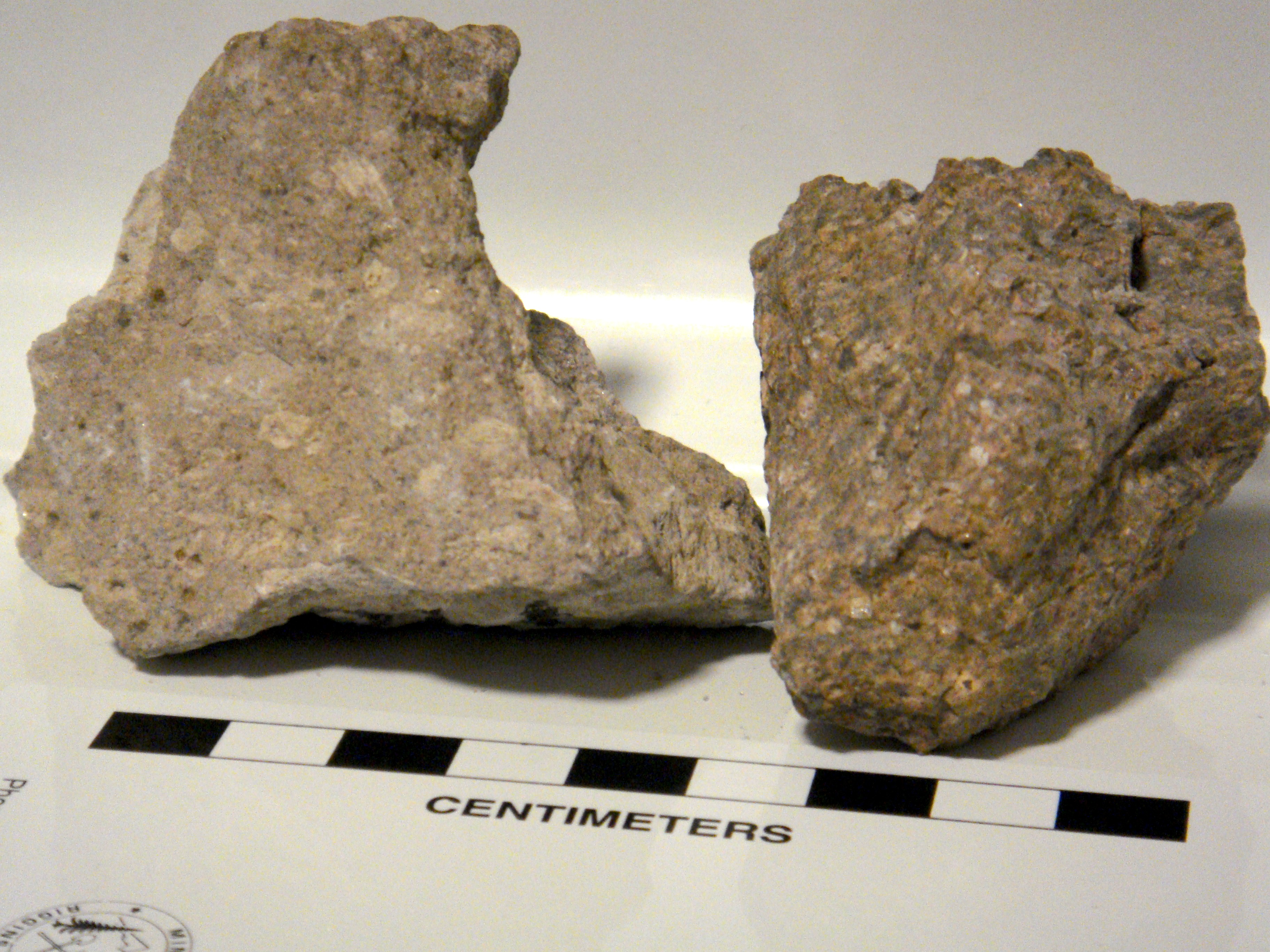
Rocks from the Bishop Tuff, uncompressed with pumice on left; compressed with fiamme on right.

Flight through a μCT-image stack of a lapillus of the volcano Katla in Iceland. Find spot: Beach near Vik at the end of road 215. Acquisition done using "CT Alpha" by "Procon X-Ray GmbH", Garbsen, Germany. Resolution 11,2μm/Voxel, width approx. 24 mm.

3D-Rendering of the above image stack, in parts transparent. Heavy particles in red.

Pyroclastic rocks are clastic rocks composed of rock fragments produced and ejected by explosive volcanic eruptions. The individual rock fragments are known as pyroclasts. Pyroclastic rocks are a type of volcaniclastic deposit, which are deposits made predominantly of volcanic particles. Phreatic pyroclastic deposits are a variety of pyroclastic rock formed from volcanic steam explosions and are entirely composed of accidental clasts. Phreatomagmatic pyroclastic deposits are formed from explosive interaction of magma with groundwater. Pyroclastic material has been produced during some of history's most powerful volcanic eruptions, including the 79 AD eruption of Mount Vesuvius, the 1980 eruption of Mount St. Helens, the large eruptions from the Yellowstone Caldera, and the 1991 eruption of Mount Pinatubo. The word pyroclastic comes from the Ancient Greek words pyr, meaning "fire", and klastos, meaning "broken in pieces".

== Description ==
Unconsolidated accumulations of pyroclasts are described as tephra. Tephra may become lithified to a pyroclastic rock by cementation or chemical reactions as the result of the passage of hot gases (fumarolic alteration) or groundwater (e.g. hydrothermal alteration and diagenesis) and burial, or if it is emplaced at temperatures so hot that the soft glassy pyroclasts stick together at point contacts and deform. This process is called welding.

One of the most notable types of pyroclastic deposit is an ignimbrite, which is the deposit of a ground-hugging pumiceous pyroclastic density current (a rapidly flowing hot suspension of pyroclasts in gas). Ignimbrites may be loose deposits or solid rock, and they can bury entire landscapes. An individual ignimbrite can exceed 1,000 km^{3} (240 cu mi) in volume, can cover 20,000 km^{2} (7,700 sq mi) of land, and may exceed 1 km (0.62 mi) thick (e.g. where it is ponded within a volcanic caldera).

== Classification ==
Pyroclasts include juvenile pyroclasts derived from chilled magma, mixed with accidental pyroclasts, which are fragments of country rock. Pyroclasts of different sizes are classified (from smallest to largest) as volcanic ash, lapilli, or volcanic blocks (or, if they exhibit evidence of having been hot and molten during emplacement, volcanic bombs). All are considered to be pyroclastic because they were formed (fragmented) by volcanic explosivity, for example during explosive decompression, shear, thermal decrepitation, or by attrition and abrasion in a volcanic conduit, volcanic jet, or pyroclastic density current.

Clast size	Pyroclast	Mainly unconsolidated (tephra)	Mainly consolidated: pyroclastic rock
> 64 mm	block (angular) bomb (if fluidal-shaped)	blocks; agglomerate	pyroclastic breccia; agglomerate
< 64 mm	lapillus	lapilli	lapillistone (lapilli tuff is where lapilli are supported within a matrix of tuff)
< 2 mm	coarse ash	coarse ash	coarse tuff
< 0.063 mm	fine ash	fine ash	fine tuff

== Transportation ==
Pyroclasts are transported in two main ways: in atmospheric eruption plumes, from which pyroclasts settle to form topography-draping pyroclastic fall layers, and by pyroclastic density currents (PDCs) (including pyroclastic flows and pyroclastic surges), from which pyroclasts are deposited as pyroclastic density current deposits, which tend to thicken and coarsen in valleys, and thin and fine over topographic highs.

== Formation ==
During Plinian eruptions, pumice and ash are formed when foaming silicic magma is fragmented in the volcanic conduit, because of rapid shear driven by decompression and the growth of microscopic bubbles. The pyroclasts are then entrained with hot gases to form a supersonic jet that exits the volcano, admixes and heats cold atmospheric air to form a vigorously buoyant eruption column that rises several kilometers into the stratosphere and cause aviation hazards. Particles fall from atmospheric eruption plumes and accumulate as layers on the ground, which are described as fallout deposits.

Pyroclastic density currents arise when the mixture of hot pyroclasts and gases is denser than the atmosphere and so, instead of rising buoyantly, it spreads out across the landscape. They are one of the greatest hazards at a volcano, and may be either 'fully dilute' (dilute, turbulent ash clouds, right down to their lower levels) or 'granular fluid based' (the lower levels of which comprise a concentrated dispersion of interacting pyroclasts and partly trapped gas). The former type are sometimes called pyroclastic surges (even though they may be sustained rather than "surging") and lower parts of the latter are sometimes termed pyroclastic flows (these, also, can be sustained and quasi steady or surging). As they travel, pyroclastic density currents deposit particles on the ground, and they entrain cold atmospheric air, which is then heated and thermally expands. Where the density current becomes sufficiently dilute to loft, it rises into the atmosphere as a 'phoenix plume' (or 'co-PDC plume'). These phoenix plumes typically deposit thin ashfall layers that may contain little pellets of aggregated fine ash.

Hawaiian eruptions such as those at Kīlauea produce an upward-directed jet of hot droplets and clots of magma suspended in gas; this is called a lava fountain or 'fire-fountain'. If sufficiently hot and liquid when they land, the hot droplets and clots of magma may agglutinate to form 'spatter' ('agglutinate'), or fully coalesce to form a clastogenic lava flow.

== Real-world examples ==
Mount Vesuvius

In 79 AD, Mount Vesuvius erupted, causing a large cloud of ash, pumice, and gas to rise in the sky before collapsing back onto the mountain in the form of pyroclastic flows. The pyroclastic flows rushed down the mountain side, burying nearby cities, such as Pompeii and Herculaneum, and killing thousands of people. The eruption covered the cities in pyroclastic rocks; preserving the cities underneath for centuries.

Mount St. Helens

In May of 1980, Mount St. Helens erupted, causing a massive landslide and a large sideways explosion, that sent ash, gas, and rock into the surrounding forests, causing substantial damage. The eruption sent a large column of ash into the sky, which then turned into pyroclastic flows that settled on the base of the mountain in the form of pyroclastic rock material.

Yellowstone Caldera

Approximately 640,000 years ago, a huge amount of magma erupted into the air, spreading ash, pumice, and other volcanic rock across thousands of miles, leaving behind a thick layer of pyroclastic material that "welded" into hard "tuff" rock. This eruption, along with two other earlier blasts, formed what is known as the Yellowstone Caldera in the Yellowstone Plateau Volcanic Field, which is one of the most studied volcanic systems in the world.

Mount Pinatubo

On June 15, 1990, in the Philippines, Mount Pinatubo erupted, causing a large column of ash to travel into the air and pyroclastic flows to slide down the mountain and fill surrounding valleys with thick pyroclastic rock debris. The eruption blanketed huge areas, as far as the Indian Ocean, which is approximately 2,500 km away, in volcanic rock fragments and fine ash.

== See also ==
- Silicon dioxide
- Hyaloclastite – Volcanic rock consisting of glass fragments
- Peperite – Sedimentary rock that contains fragments of younger igneous material
- Scoria – Dark vesicular volcanic rock

== Other reading ==
- Blatt, Harvey and Robert J. Tracy (1996) Petrology: Igneous, Sedimentary, and Metamorphic, W.H.W. Freeman & Company; 2nd ed., pp. 26–29; ISBN 0-7167-2438-3
- Branney, M.J., Brown, R.J. and Calder, E. (2020) Pyroclastic Rocks. In: Elias, S. and Alderton D. (eds) Encyclopedia of Geology. 2nd Edition. Elsevier. ISBN 9780081029084
