= Caleta Herradura Formation =

Geological formation in Chile

- Stratigraphic range: Late Miocene-Pliocene (Montehermosan)
- Type: Geological formation
- Underlies: La Portada Formation
- Overlies: Jorgino Formation
- Thickness: 380 m (1,250 ft)

Lithology
- Primary: Sandstone, sandy mudstone, breccia, conglomerate
- Other: Diatomite

Location
- Coordinates: 23.4°S 70.5°W
- Approximate paleocoordinates: 23.5°S 69.8°W
- Region: Antofagasta Region
- Country: Chile
- Extent: Mejillones Peninsula

Type section
- Named for: Caleta Herradura Chica
- Caleta Herradura Formation (Chile)

Caleta Herradura Formation (Spanish: Formación Caleta Herradura) is a geologic formation of Late Miocene (Montehermosan) age, cropping out on the Mejillones Peninsula in northern Chile. The erosion at the Coastal Cliff of northern Chile have created particularly good exposures of Caleta Herradura Formation. The formation deposited in a half graben within Mejillones Peninsula. The formation rests nonconformably on the Jorgino Formation.

== Fossil content ==
The following fossils have been found in the formation:

Group	Fossils	Notes
Mammals	Balaenopteridae indet., Odontoceti indet., Otariidae indet.	
Birds	Spheniscus chilensis, Milvago sp., Phalacrocorax sp.	
Fish	Carcharodon carcharias, Carcharias sp., Carcharhinus sp., Chondrichthyes indet., Myliobatidae indet.	

== See also ==
- Cerro Ballena
- Coquimbo Formation
- Navidad Formation
- Pisco Formation
