= Mejillones Metamorphic Complex =

- Stratigraphic range: Triassic–Jurassic
- Type: Complex

Lithology
- Primary: Metaturbidite, schist, gneiss, amphibolite, quartzite

Location
- Region: Antofagasta Region
- Country: Chile

Type section
- Named for: Mejillones Peninsula

The Mejillones Metamorphic Complex is made up of two separate outcrops of metamorphic rocks in the Mejillones Peninsula of northern Chile. Turbidites of low metamorphic grade make up the northern outcrop at Morro Mejillones. The southern outcrop lies at Morro Jorgiño and is made up of schist, gneiss, amphibolite and quartzite. Rocks at Morro Jorgiño are intruded by garnet-bearing leucogranites.
