= Golden rain demonstration =

Precipitation of lead(II) iodide

Reversible formation of "golden rain"

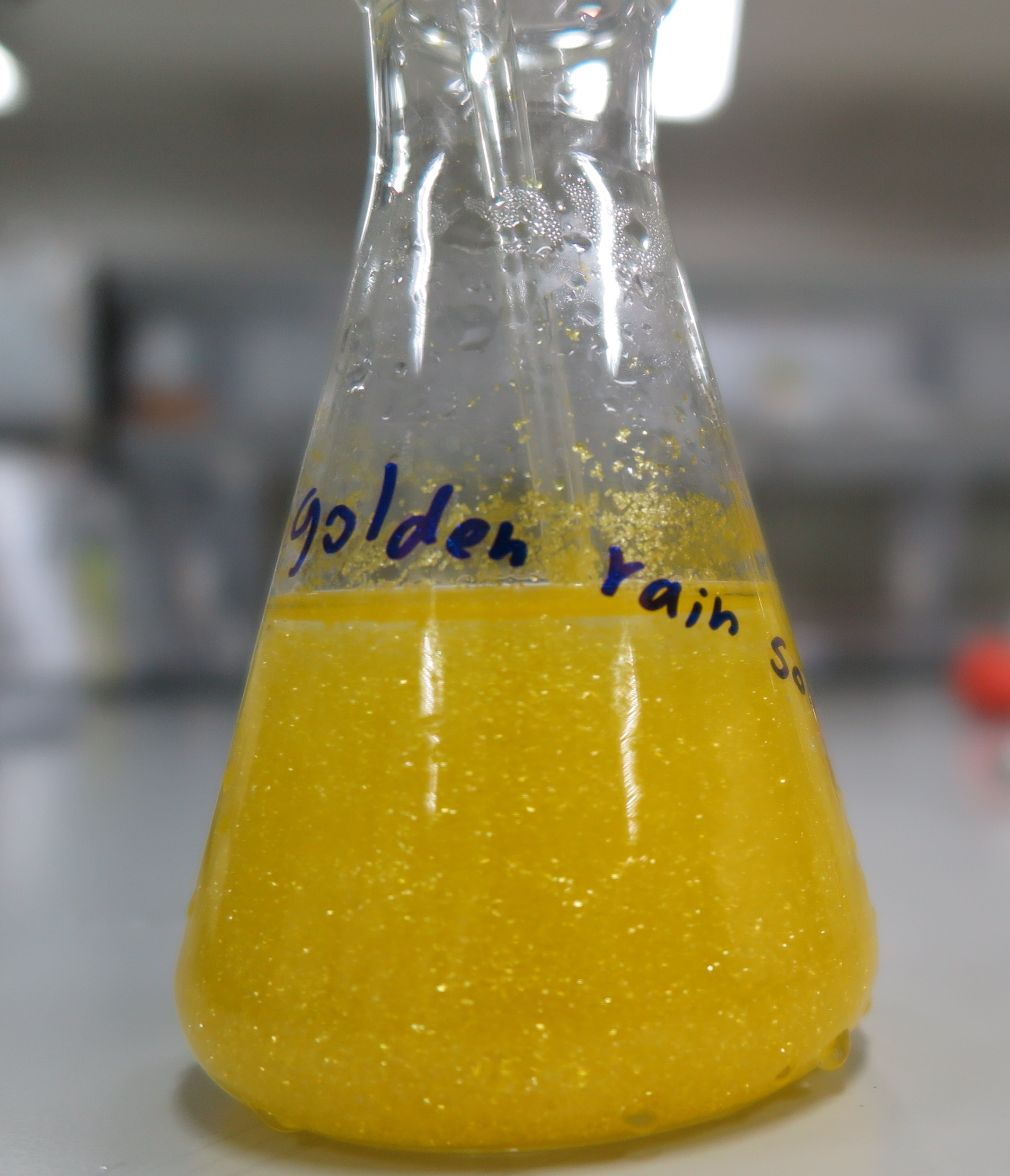
At room temperature

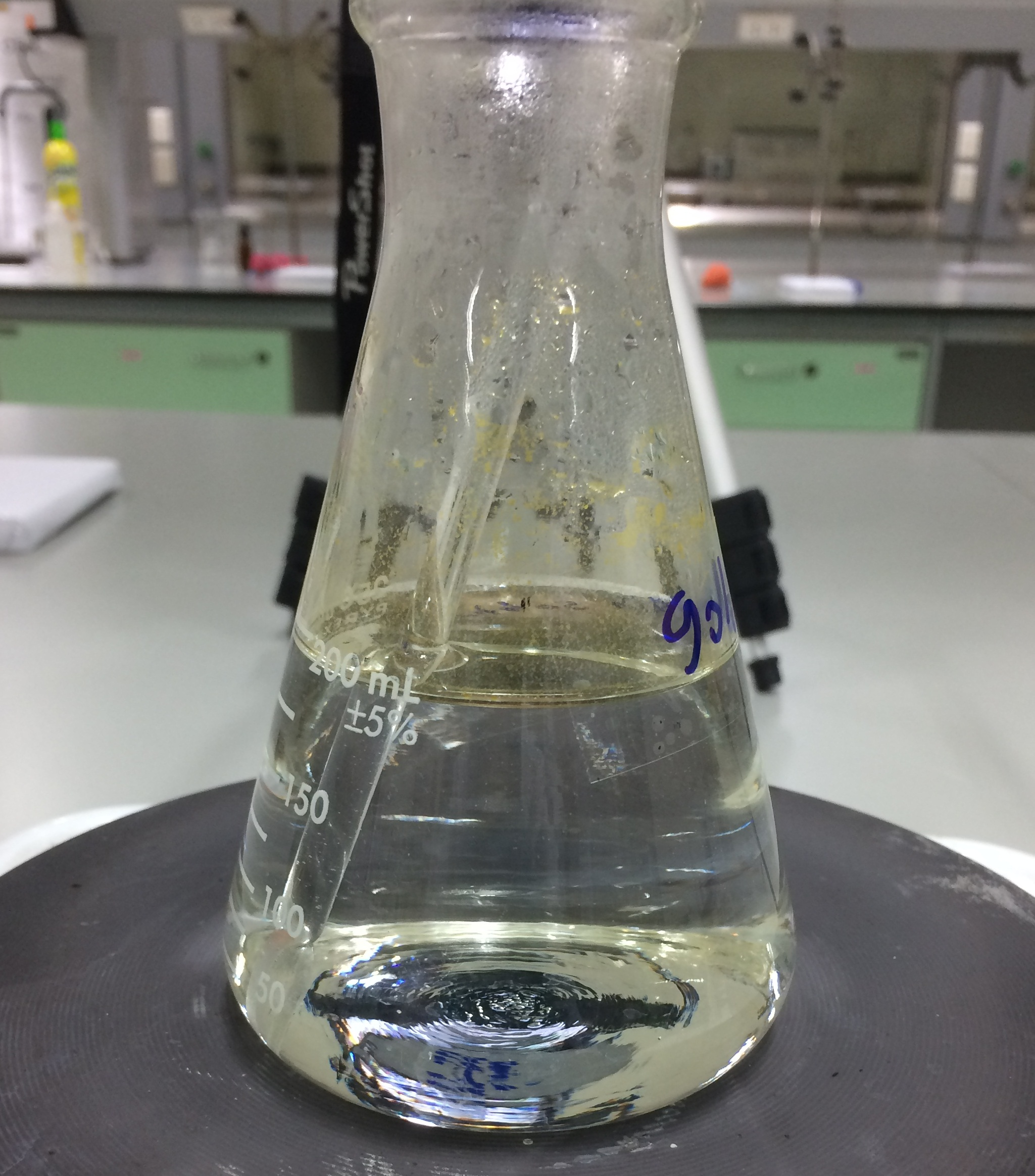
When heated

Golden rain demonstration is made by combining two colorless solutions, potassium iodide solution and Lead(II) nitrate solution at room temperature to form yellow precipitate. During the chemical reaction, golden particles gently drop from the top of Erlenmeyer flask to the bottom, similar to watching the rain through a window. The golden rain chemical reaction demonstrates the formation of a solid precipitate. The golden rain experiment involves two soluble ionic compounds, potassium iodide (KI) and lead(II) nitrate (Pb(NO_{3})_{2}). They are initially dissolved in separate water solutions, which are each colorless. When mixed, as the lead from one solution and the iodide from the other combine to form lead(II) iodide (PbI_{2}), which is insoluble at low temperature and has a bright golden-yellow color. Although this is a reaction solely of the dissociated ions in solution, it is sometimes referred to as a double displacement reaction:

Pb(NO_{3})_{2} + 2 KI → 2 KNO_{3} + PbI_{2}

At higher temperature, this substance easily re-dissolves by dissociation to its colorless ions. The actual change (net ionic equation) is thus:

$$\underbrace\ce{ {Pb^{2+}_{(aq)}} + 2I^-_{(aq)} }_\text{colorless solution} \ce{<=>} \underbrace\ce{ PbI_{2(s)} }_\text{yellow precipitate}$$
