= Atacama Fault =

System of geological faults in northern Chile

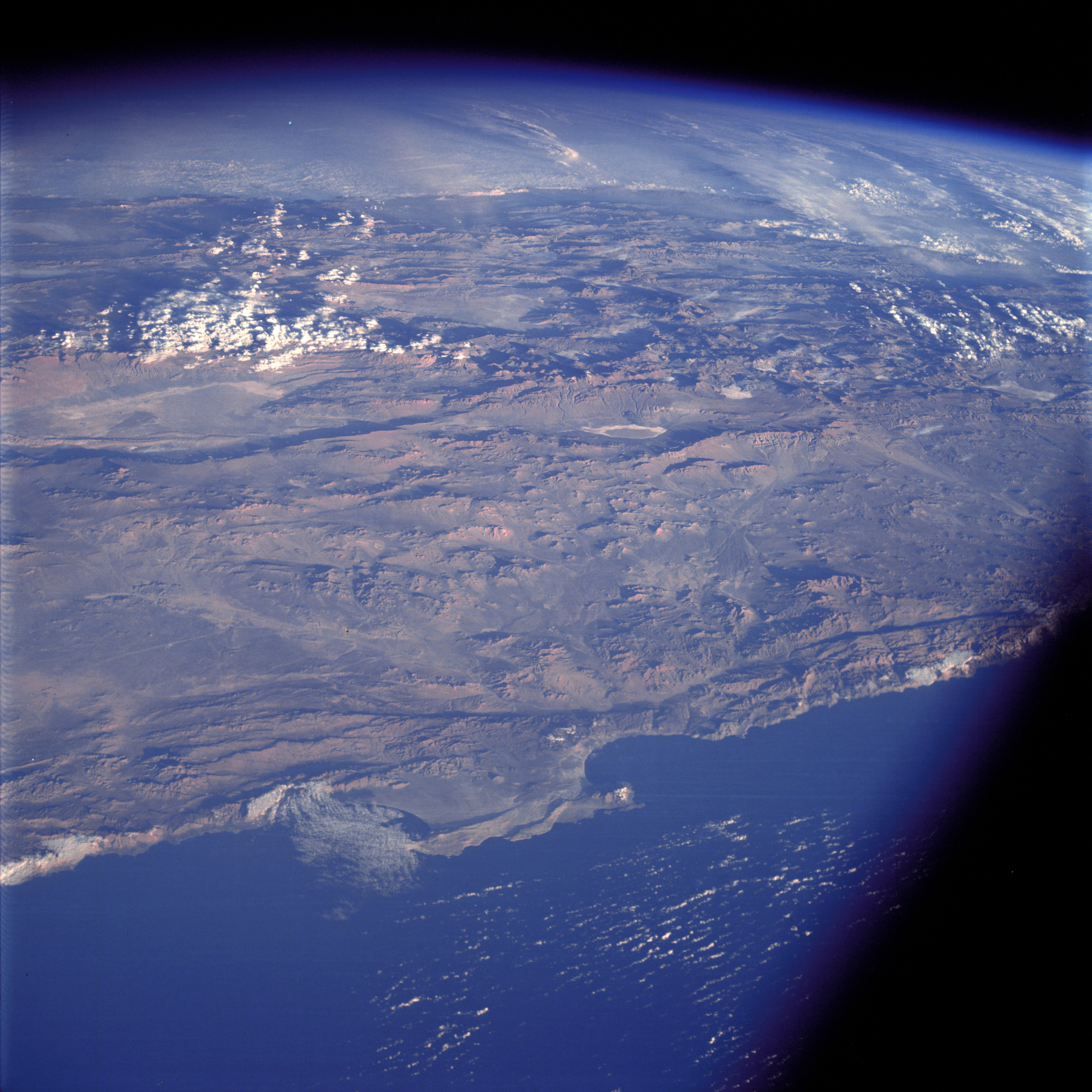
Satellite picture showing Atacama Desert and the Atacama Fault parallel to the coast near Antofagasta and Mejillones Peninsula

The Atacama Fault Zone (AFZ) is an extensive system of faults cutting across the Chilean Coastal Cordillera in Northern Chile between the Andean Mountain range and the Pacific Ocean. The fault system is north–south striking and runs for more than 1100 km North and up to 50 km in width through the Andean forearc region. The zone is a direct result of the ongoing subduction of the Eastward moving Nazca plate beneath the South American plate and is believed to have formed in the Early Jurassic during the beginning of the Andean orogeny. The zone can be split into 3 regions: the North, Central and South.

== Tectonic history and formation ==
The AFZ has gone through periods of inactivity and reactivation since its inception in the Cretaceous. The fault series was formed through a complex series of tectonic regimes dating back to the Early Jurassic, when the Andean back-arc basin separated from the Pacific Ocean. Intra-arc ductile deformation occurred in the Late Jurassic, creating north-striking mylonitic shear zones. A belt formed through a compressive regime in the Early Cretaceous, followed by a compression of the Andean basement in the mid-Cretaceous. There was a regime of extension from the Oligocene to Miocene, and finally large brittle reactivations took place from the Miocene to Present.

== Regional geology ==
The fault zone penetrates the Chilean Coastal Cordillera through north–south striking elongate terranes of Jurassic to early Cretaceous igneous rocks. The region was formed through arc-magmatism and is composed of mostly andesitic tuffs and lavas with large diorite batholiths. In the eastern branches of the fault Cretaceous-aged porphyry copper deposits are associated to diorite and dacite stocks-type intrusions. These porphyry copper deposits are poorly known constituting thus possible new targets for copper mining. Certain areas of the mentioned igneous province are overlain by terranes of continental clastic rocks and marine limestones. Past and recent fault activity has reworked some of the surrounding rock, producing regions of ductilely deformed rocks, which can be categorized into two types: Cretaceous plutonic rocks (tonalites) deformed under greenschist conditions and metamorphic rocks from Jurassic volcanics, which includes intrusive rocks (diorites, gabbros and tonalites), and Paleozoic greywackes formed in mid-amphibolite facies conditions.

From Chañaral to the south the fault system coincides in extent with the Chilean Iron Belt, a collection of iron ore deposit running all the way to El Romeral next to La Serena. It is thought that the Atacama Fault acted as a "transcrustal" fault that allowed for molten iron ore magma migrate from its place of origin in the Earth's mantle to shallow of the crust event reaching surface in volcanic eruptions of iron oxide. The resulting rock after the cooling of these magmas is iron oxide-apatite.

Near Huasco the western branch of the Atacama Fault System is the Infiernillo Shear Zone (Spanish: Zona de Cizalla de Infiernillo) which runns in NNE-SSW direction and makes the limit between the Early Cretaceous Infiernillo Plutonic Complex and the formations of La Negra (Jurassic) and Canto del Agua (Triassic) as well as some metamorphic rocks.

The southernmost commonly recognized section of the Atacama Fault System is Romeral Fault which reaches the coast near La Serena. South of Romeral Fault the inland NS-oriented Panulcillo Fault has been described as a continuation with its more eastern position being attributed to displacement by a younger NW-trending fault.

== Fault mechanics ==
Due to the extensional regime shaping the region, the system is dominated by normal faulting, most of which is north–south striking and dipping around 60 degrees to the East. Though the system is mostly dip-slip, there are regions of strike-slip formed mylonites in the East providing evidence for past sinistral strike-slip motion.

The general strike of the fault system is north–south, though the fault activity varies between the 3 regions of the AFZ. The Northern region encompasses the Salar del Carmen major fault which splits the region into a Western domain with large active faults striking N160 to N170 and an Eastern domain with mostly inactive faults overlain by Quaternary deposits. In the Central region the Coastal Range is bounded by the N–S striking Remiendo Fault with ancient fault scarps in the eastern area of the region. In the Southern region the Coastal Range is bounded by the El Salado Fault, which trends North and is cut to the north by TalTal N130 striking faults.
