= Coastal plains of Chile =

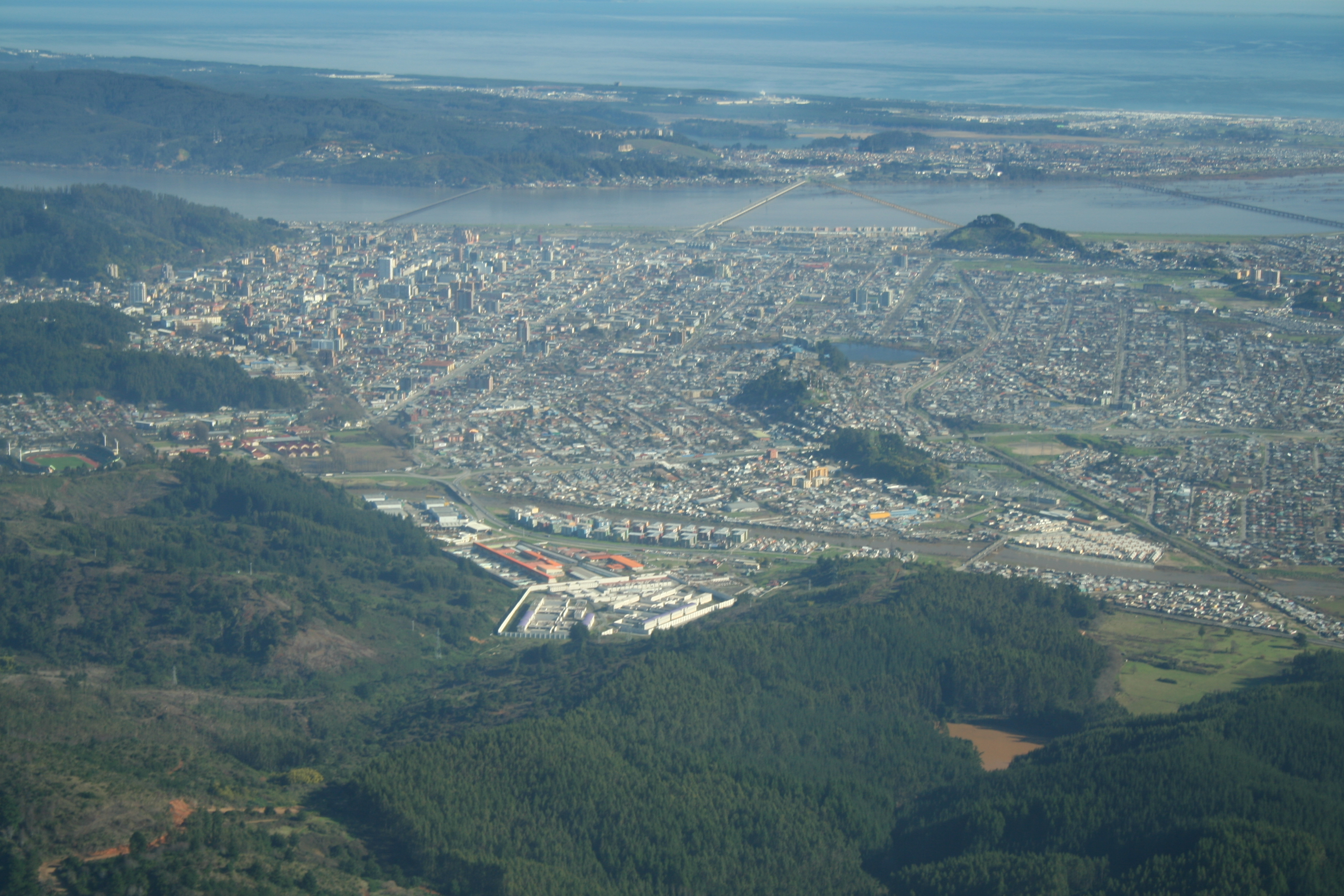
Valle de la Mocha upon which the city of Concepción is emplaced is a coastal plain.

The coastal plains of Chile (Spanish: Planicies litorales) are a series of discontinuous coastal plains found over much of Chile. Together with the Chilean Coast Range, the Chilean Central Valley, and the Andes proper the coastal plains are one of the main landscape units of Chile. In Coquimbo and Valparaíso regions these plains are of fluvial or marine origin, and sometimes of combined fluvial and marine origin.

== See also ==
- Borde costero
- Coastal Cliff of northern Chile
