= Mejillones (disambiguation) =

Mejillones is a Chilean port city and commune in Antofagasta Province in the Antofagasta Region.

Mejillones (Spanish plural for mussel), can refer to:

- Puerto de Mejillones Province, a province in the western parts of the Bolivian department of Oruro
- Mejillones Peninsula protrudes from the coast of northern Chile north of Antofagasta and south of the port of Mejillones
- Municipal Mejillones, a Chilean football club
