= La Negra Formation =

Geologic formation in Chile

- Stratigraphic range: Jurassic
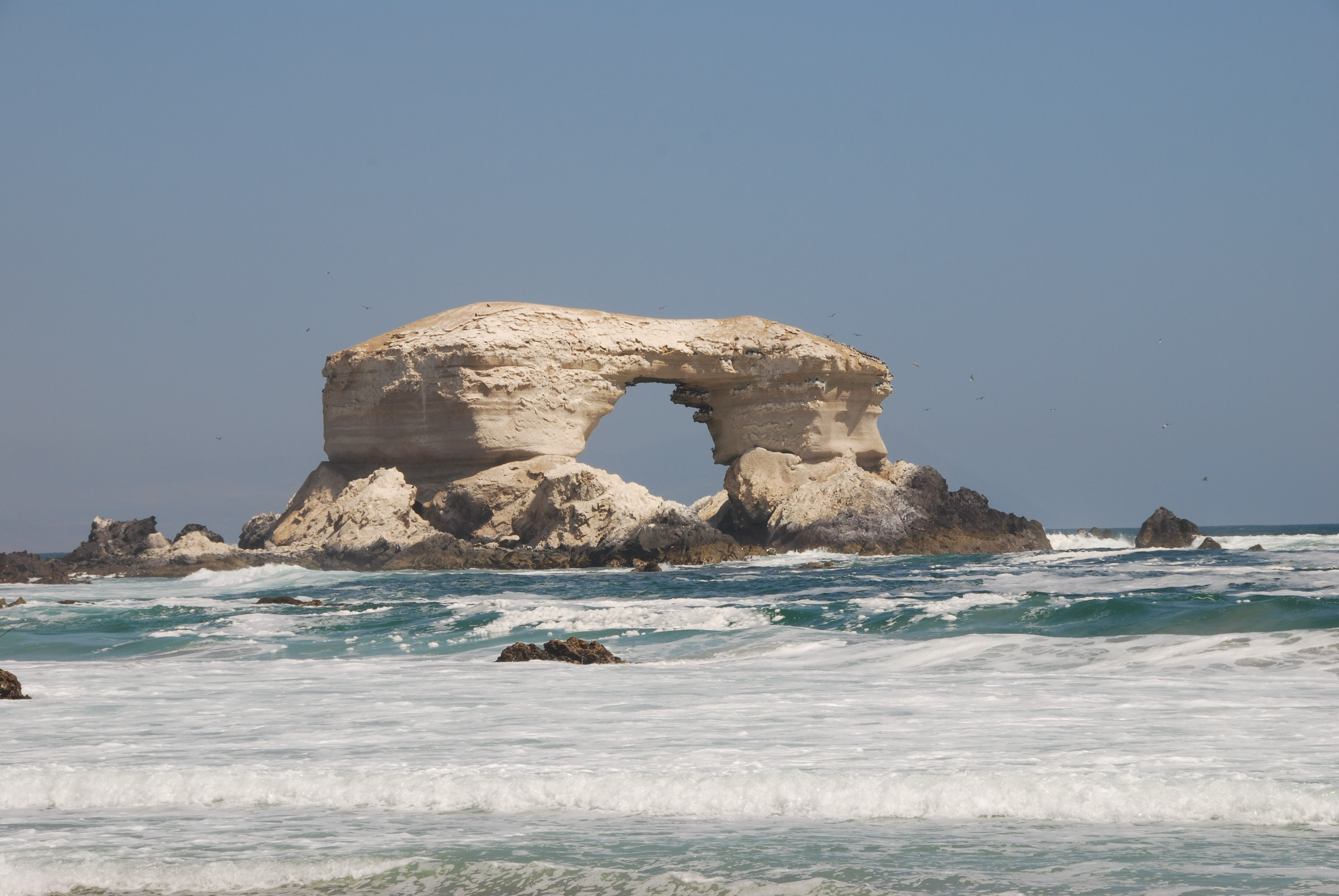
- View of La Portada, an arch made of bright Miocene sediments resting on darker rocks of La Negra Formation
- Type: Geological formation
- Underlies: Caleta Coloso Formation; Arqueros Formation
- Overlies: Cerro de Cuevitas Beds; Pan de Azúcar Formation; Posada de los Hidalgo
- Thickness: ~7,000 m (23,000 ft)

Lithology
- Primary: Volcaniclastic rocks, andesite, basaltic andesite, basalt
- Other: Dacite, hyaloclastite breccia, conglomerate, limestone, marl, peperite, grey breccia

Location
- Region: Antofagasta Region
- Country: Chile

Type section
- Named for: Quebrada La Negra
- Named by: Floreal García (1967)
- Thickness at type section: 3,000 m (9,800 ft)

La Negra Formation (Spanish: Formación La Negra) is a geologic formation of Jurassic age, composed chiefly of volcanic and volcaniclastic rocks, located in the Coast Range of northern Chile. The formation originated in marine and continental (terrestrial) conditions, and bears evidence of submarine volcanism as well as large explosive eruptions. The volcanism of La Negra Formation is thought to have lasted for about five million years.

The formation has a thickness of about 7,000 metres (23,000 ft) with the type section being a 3,000 metres (9,800 ft) thick exposure in Quebrada La Negra next to Antofagasta. La Negra Formation deposited diachronously along a series of intra-arc basins and overlies conformably the formations of Pan de Azúcar and Posada de los Hidalgo. The formation is intruded by plutons of varied composition including gabbro and granite.

== La Negra Arc ==
Together with the Arica Group and the Camaraca, Los Tarros and Oficina Viz formations, it constitutes the remains of the La Negra Arc, an ancient volcanic arc that existed in Jurassic times. Albeit early, this is not the first recorded instance of Andean volcanism in northern Chile as the Triassic and Jurassic formations of Cifuncho, Agua Chica, Pan de Azúcar and Posada de los Hidalgos that underlie La Negra Formation do also bear evidence of volcanism. In relation to present-day geography La Negra Arc went from latitude 18°S to 26°S and its orientation was roughly north-south similar to today's disposition of La Negra Formations outcrops.

Near Taltal the volcanism of La Negra Arc developed largely in marine conditions with most volcanic eruptions being effusive, yet volcanism was punctuated by large explosive eruptions.

== Lithology ==
The formation is made up of volcaniclastic rocks, and non-volcaniclastic rocks such as andesite, basalt, basaltic andesites and some lesser amounts of dacite. The non-volcaniclastic rocks correspond variously to lava flows with autobrecciated parts, lava domes, cryptodomes and pillow lavas. The volcaniclastic rocks of the formation include hyaloclastite breccias, peperites and felsic ignimbrites. This last rock type forms at some locations the lowermost parts of the formation. In addition, the formation contains limestone, marl, conglomerate and grey breccias.

== Geochemistry and petrogenesis ==
The volcanic rocks of La Negra Formation show little diversity in their geochemistry. Fractional crystallization of olivine, plagioclase and pyroxene appear to be the cause of the igneous differentiation that produced basaltic andesites and andesites. The rocks belong to the calc-alkaline magma series and high-K calc-alkaline magma series. The magma series and other geochemical characteristics found in the volcanic rocks of La Negra Formation are characteristic of subduction zone volcanism. The magmas originated in a parcel of Earth's mantle that was metasomatized by fluid derived from the tectonic plate that was subducting beneath what is now Chile. A nearby gabbro body, the Coloso Coastal Gabbro, is thought to share the same origin as the volcanic rocks of La Negra Formation.

== Metamorphism and mineralization ==
The formation has been subject to mild low-grade metamorphism as evidenced by the occurrence of an epidote-chlorite-calcite-chalcedony-zeolite-prehnite-pumpellyite association. Metamorphism is more pronounced in the brecciated parts of lava flows and near Antofagasta if compared with La Negra Formation near Tocopilla. It hosts numerous small and medium-sized copper deposits whose mineralogy usually grades from chalcopyrite-pyrite-magnetite at deeper levels to chalcosite-tetrahedrite-hematite at shallower levels. The shallower levels of mineralization contains most of the copper oxides.

Inside the intrusions that are hosted within La Negra Formation there are several vertical or near-vertical veins bearing chalcopyrite, magnetite and actinolite. Some more rare veins are made up of some of the following associations: silver-gold, iron-copper, iron and nickel-cobalt. All of these veins have similar ages as the larger intrusions.

The manto-type copper and silver deposits found in La Negra Formation make up the northern portion of the Chilean Iron Belt.

== See also ==
- Casma Group
- Choyoi Group
