= Way Group =

- Stratigraphic range: Early Cretaceous
- Type: Stratigraphic group
- Sub-units: Tableado Formation; Lombriz Formation; Caleta Coloso Formation
- Overlies: La Negra Formation

Lithology
- Primary: Conglomerate, sandstone, limestone, breccia
- Other: Shale, siltstone, mudstone, evaporite

Location
- Region: Antofagasta Region
- Country: Chile

Way Group (Spanish: Grupo Way) is a geologic group of Lower Cretaceous age located in northern Chile. The sediments of the group deposited in Coloso Basin, a small intra-arc basin made up by a half graben. The now inactive Coloso Basin is elongated along a NNW-SSE oriented axis and has its southwestern border made up by faults.

The Way Group is made up of the following arrangement from top to bottom the Tablado Formation made up chiefly of limestone, the conglomerate-gravel-sandstone Lombriz Formation and the conglomerate and breccia dominated Caleta Coloso Formation.

== Tabledo Formation ==
Tableado Formation is the uppermost member of Way Group. It is made up of limestone and shale deposited in the shallow marine conditions of the continental shelf. The limestones contains fossils. It rests conformably on top of Lombriz Formation.

== Lombriz Formation ==
Clasts of epidotized lava are common in the conglomerates of Lombriz Formation. The clasts of Lombriz Formation are made up of andesite and diorite. The climate at the time of deposition of the Lombriz Formation was arid as evidenced by the evaporites that are part of the formation.

== Coloso Formation ==
Caleta Coloso Formation or Coloso Formation is the lowermost formation of the Way Group. The breccias and conglomerates of Coloso Formation are the deposits of former alluvial fans. In particular, Coloso Formation represents the parts of the alluvial fan closer to the apex. Minas Conglomerate is the name of a group of conglomerate beds in upper Coloso Formation that contains what is known as Minas Conglomerate, a conglomerate rich in clasts with copper mineralization. The lower Coloso Formation contains a majority of andesite clasts while the upper Coloso Formation contains more diorite. Possibly, this difference indicates a sequence of erosion starting from more surficial volcanic rocks and then plutonic rocks. Diagenesis has formed analcime, calcite and hematite in the matrix of the lower Coloso Formation.
