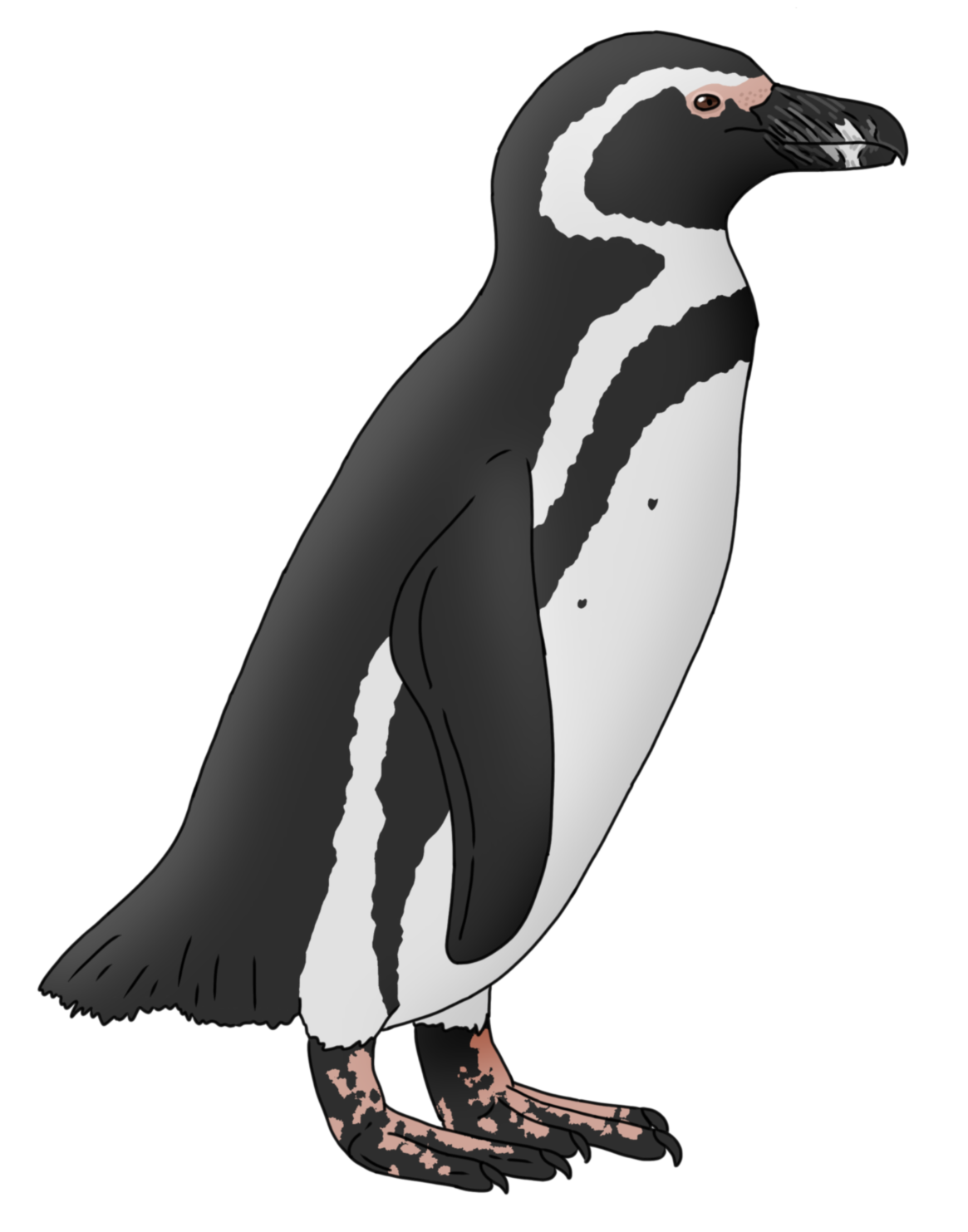
- Life restoration

Scientific classification
- Domain: Eukaryota
- Kingdom: Animalia
- Phylum: Chordata
- Class: Aves
- Order: Sphenisciformes
- Family: Spheniscidae
- Genus: Spheniscus
- Species: †S. chilensis

Binomial name
- †Spheniscus chilensis Emslie and Correa, 2003

= Spheniscus chilensis =

Spheniscus chilensis Temporal range: Late Pliocene,3.6–2.588 Ma

Extinct species of bird

Spheniscus chilensis is an extinct species of penguin that lived during the Late Pliocene in Chile. The first fossil record of the penguin was discovered on the coast of Antofagasta in 1980, when coastal erosion exposed the first fossilized bone.

== Discovery and naming ==
Spheniscus chilensis was discovered in 1980 at the site Cuenca del Tiburón near Antofagasta, Chile, which is part of the Late Pliocene Caleta Herradura Formation. This is the only locality from which it is known to occur. The fossil remains of S. chilensis consisted of dozens of disarticulated bones from different individuals that had eroded from a nearby rock formation. The specific name "Chilensis" references Chile, the country where it was discovered. See "Spheniscus" for the etymology of the generic name.

The name Diomedea chilensis Molina was published in 1782 in his Saggio sulla storia naturale del Chili (pp. 238--239). This is an available scientific name which has been construed as a synonym of Spheniscus demersus (Linnaeus, 1758) by Elliott Coues in the Proceedings of the Academy of Natural Sciences of Philadelphia ("Material for a Monograph of the Spheniscidae," pp. 173, 209 (1872)). However, W. R. Ogilvie-Grant, in Volume 26 of the Catalogue of the Birds in the British Museum (p. 625), regarded chilensis Molina as indeterminate and suggested that it may actually refer to Spheniscus humboldti, the Humboldt Penguin, which was not formally described until 1834 by Franz Julius Ferdinand Meyen.

If Diomedea chilensis Molina is not indeterminate, then it may be construed in the synonymy of Spheniscus humboldti, of which it has priority by 52 years. If it is a synonym of Spheniscus demersus, then it represents a case of secondary homonymy, in which Spheniscus chilensis Emslie & Correa 2003 is the junior secondary homonym.

== Description ==
The holotype consists of a complete left humerus and was one of the main features used to distinguish S. chilensis as a new species. The humerus has deep fossa at the proximal anconal surface below the head and a relatively small and narrow entepicondylar process, different from any living Spheniscus species. It also has a relatively slender shaft similar to S. magellanicus and S. demerus. The tarsometatarsus has shallow anterior grooves below the proximal foramina, different from all living Spheniscus. The ulna, radius, carpometatarsus and femur show only minor differences from living species of the genus.

In size and proportions S. chilensis is most similar to the living S. humboldti and S. magellanicus.
