= Coastal Cliff of northern Chile =

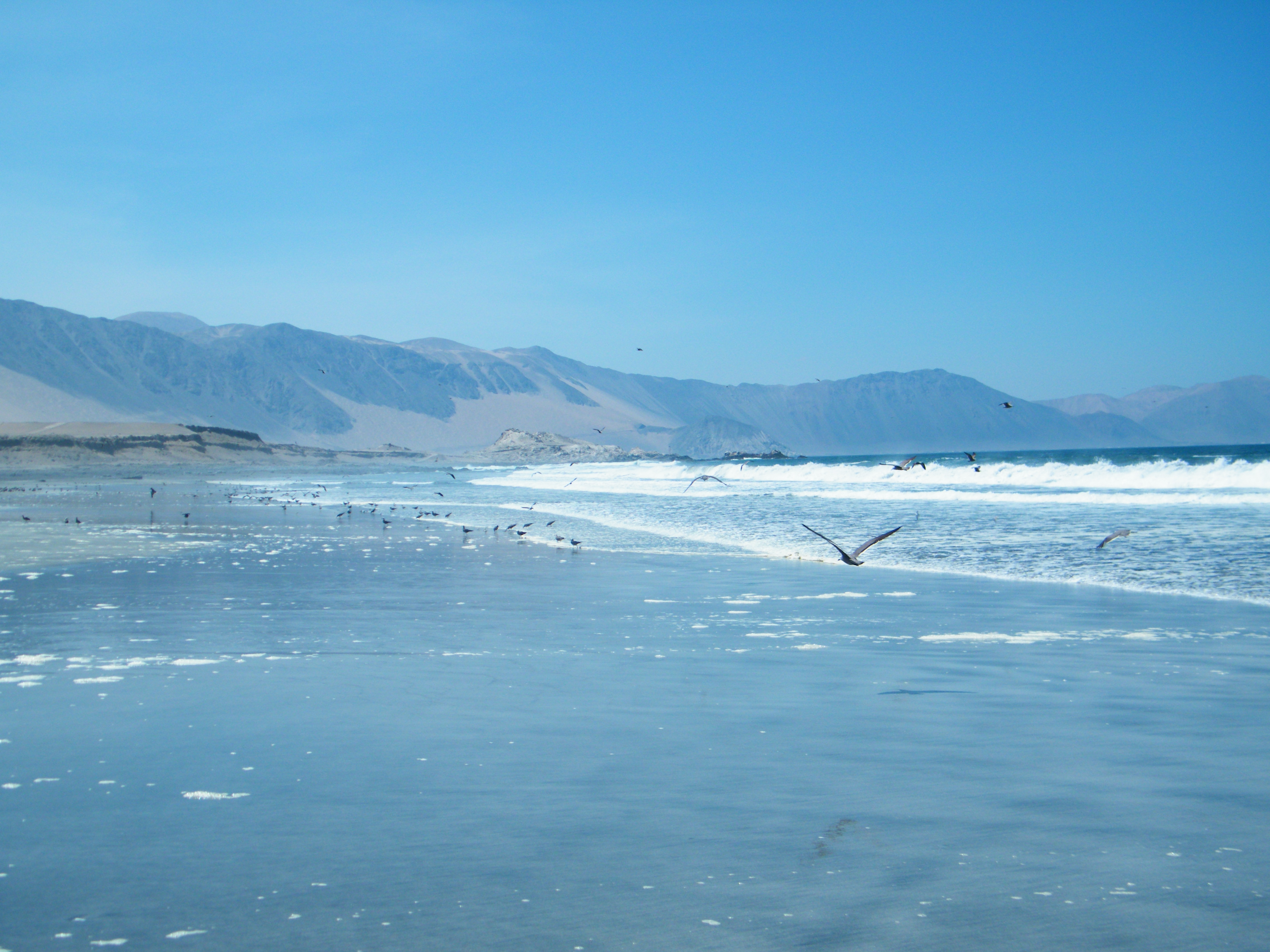
View of the arid mountains near Iquique ending abruptly in the Pacific Ocean.

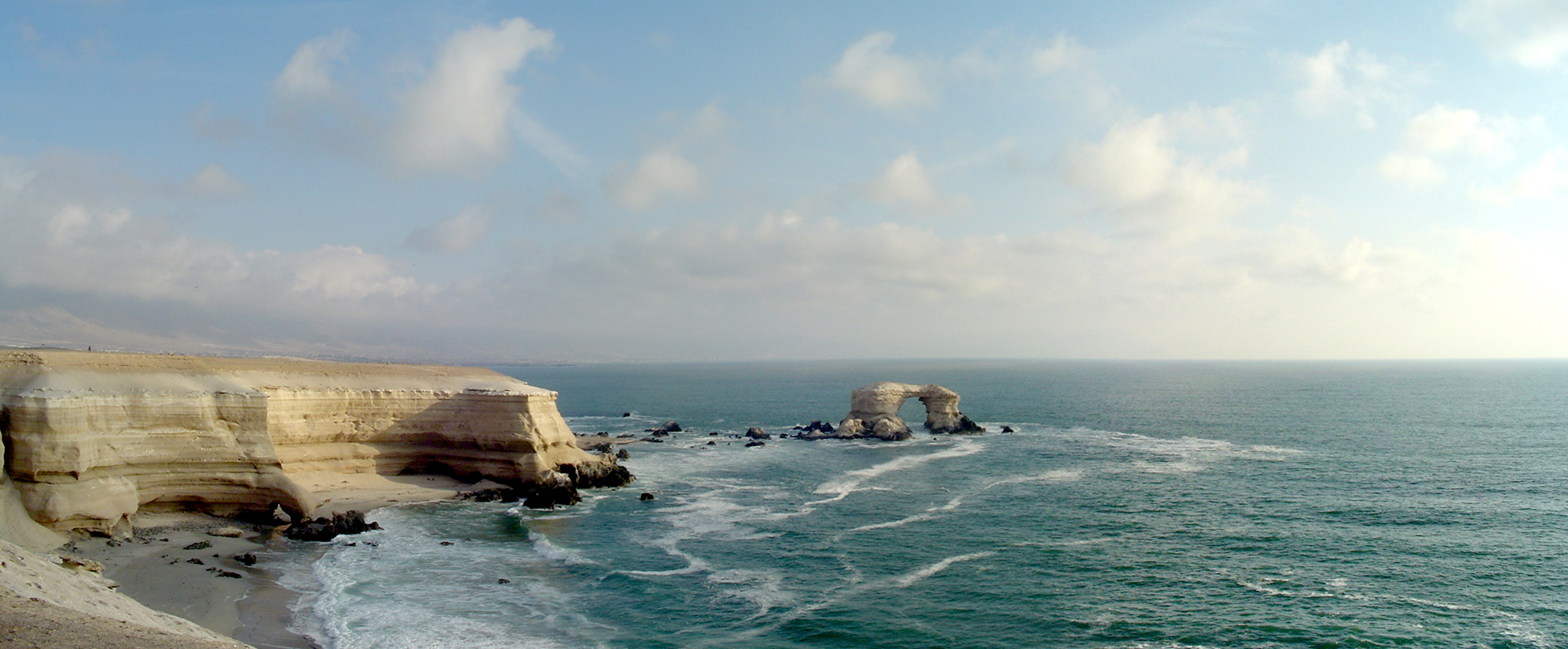
The coastal cliff at La Portada near Antofagasta.

The Coastal Cliff of northern Chile (Spanish: Acantilado Costero) stretches over a length of more than 1000 km along the Atacama Desert. It makes up a large part of the western boundary to the Chilean Coast Range in the regions of Arica y Parinacota, Tarapacá, Antofagasta, and Atacama. According to Roland Paskoff, the modern cliff originated from a scarp retreat of a fault scarp, thus at present the cliff does not follow any fault.

In some locations, a series of coastal benches can be found below the cliff. Despite alternating uplift and subsidence of the continent at a decadal timescale, the cliff and the entire western edge of the South American Plate has faced a long-term uplift during the last 2.5 million years.

== See also ==
- Atacama Fault
- Borde costero
- Coastal plains of Chile
