= La Portada Formation =

Geologic formation in Chile

- Stratigraphic range: Miocene–Pliocene
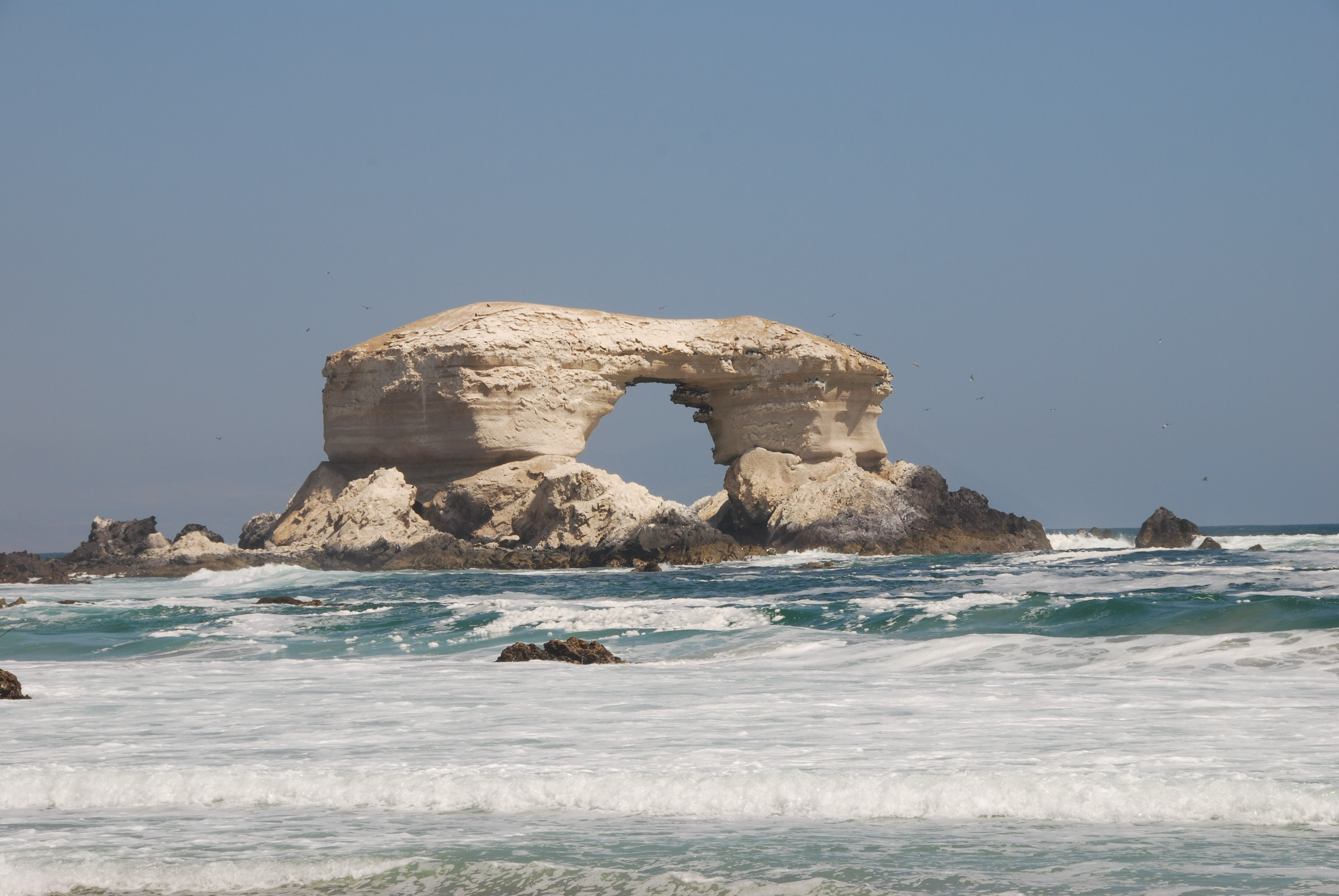
- View of La Portada, the namesake arch made of La Portada Formation rocks resting on darker rocks of Jurassic La Negra Formation
- Type: Geological formation
- Sub-units: Cerro Bandurrias & Cuesta del Burro Members
- Underlies: Mejillones Formation
- Overlies: Caleta Herradura Formation

Lithology
- Primary: Sandstone

Location
- Coordinates: 23.4°S 70.5°W
- Approximate paleocoordinates: 23.6°S 69.5°W
- Region: Antofagasta Region
- Country: Chile

Type section
- Named for: La Portada de Antofagasta
- La Portada Formation (Chile)

La Portada Formation (Spanish: Formación La Portada) is a geologic formation of Miocene and Pliocene age located near the Coast Range of northern Chile. The coarse-grained sandstones of the formation contain penguin fossils.

== See also ==
- Cerro Ballena
- Coquimbo Formation
- Navidad Formation
