= Lead(II) nitrate =

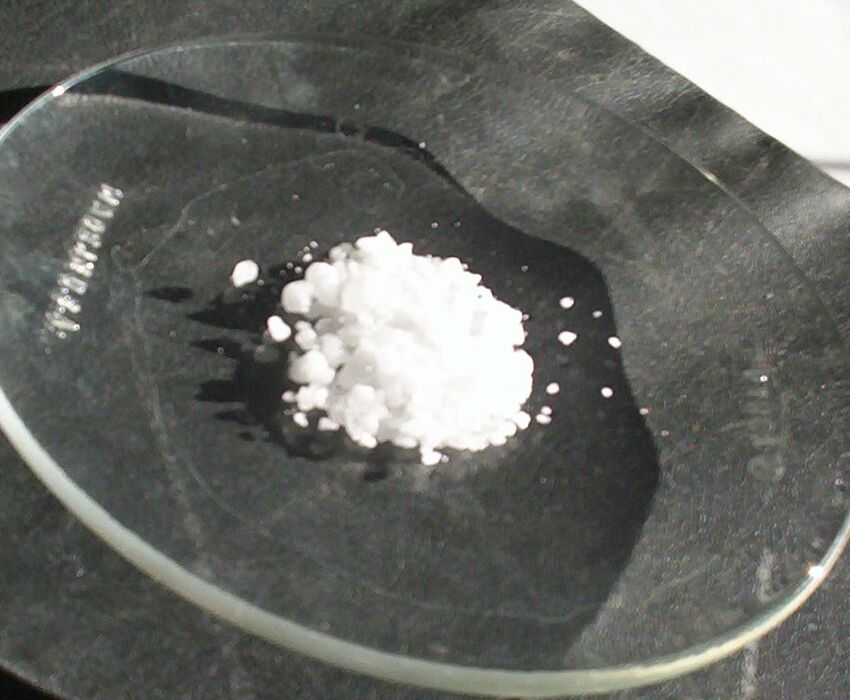

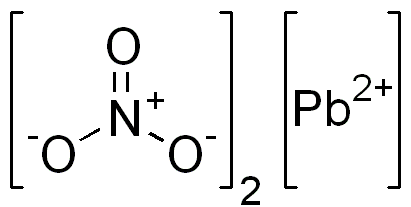

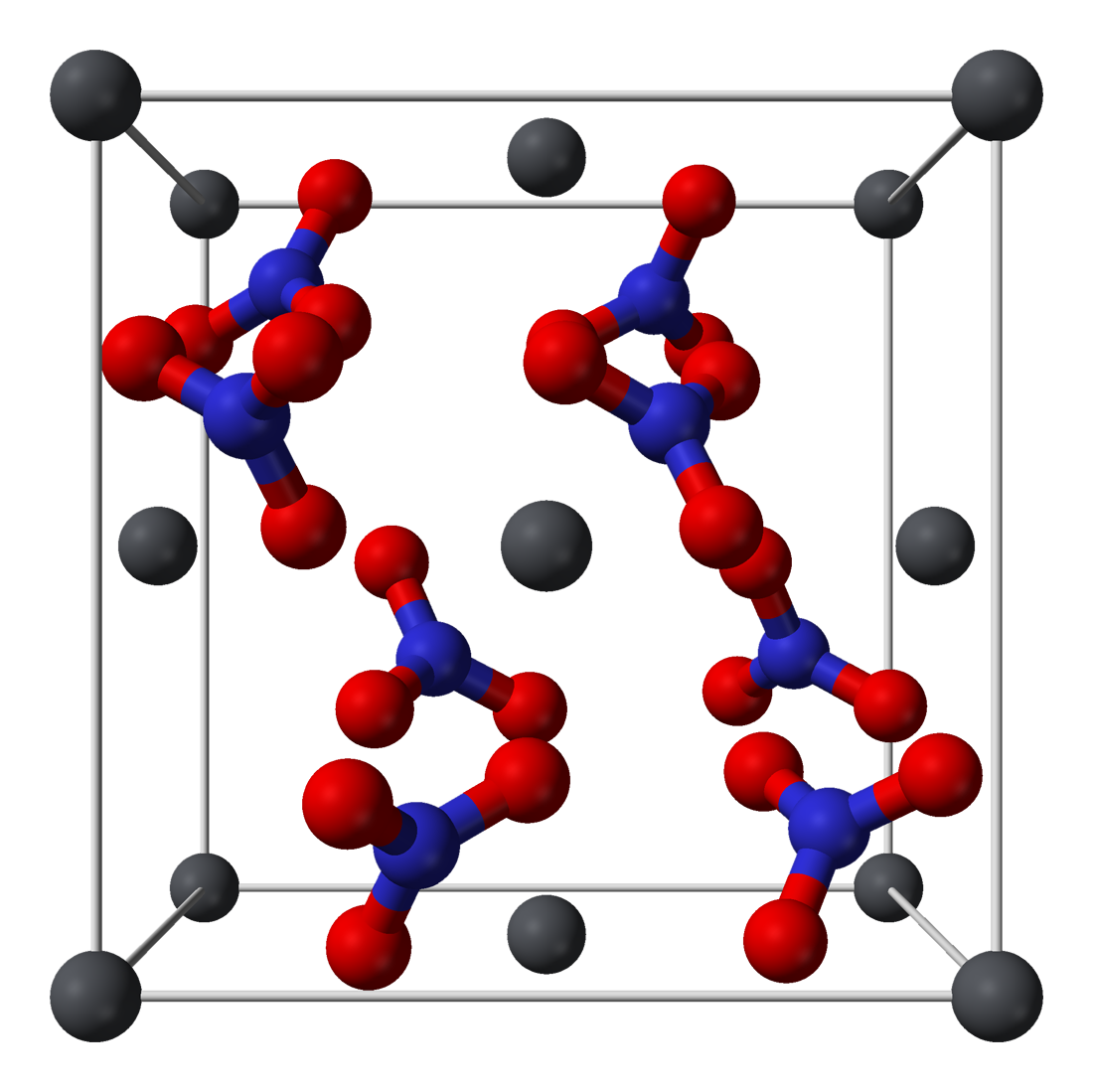

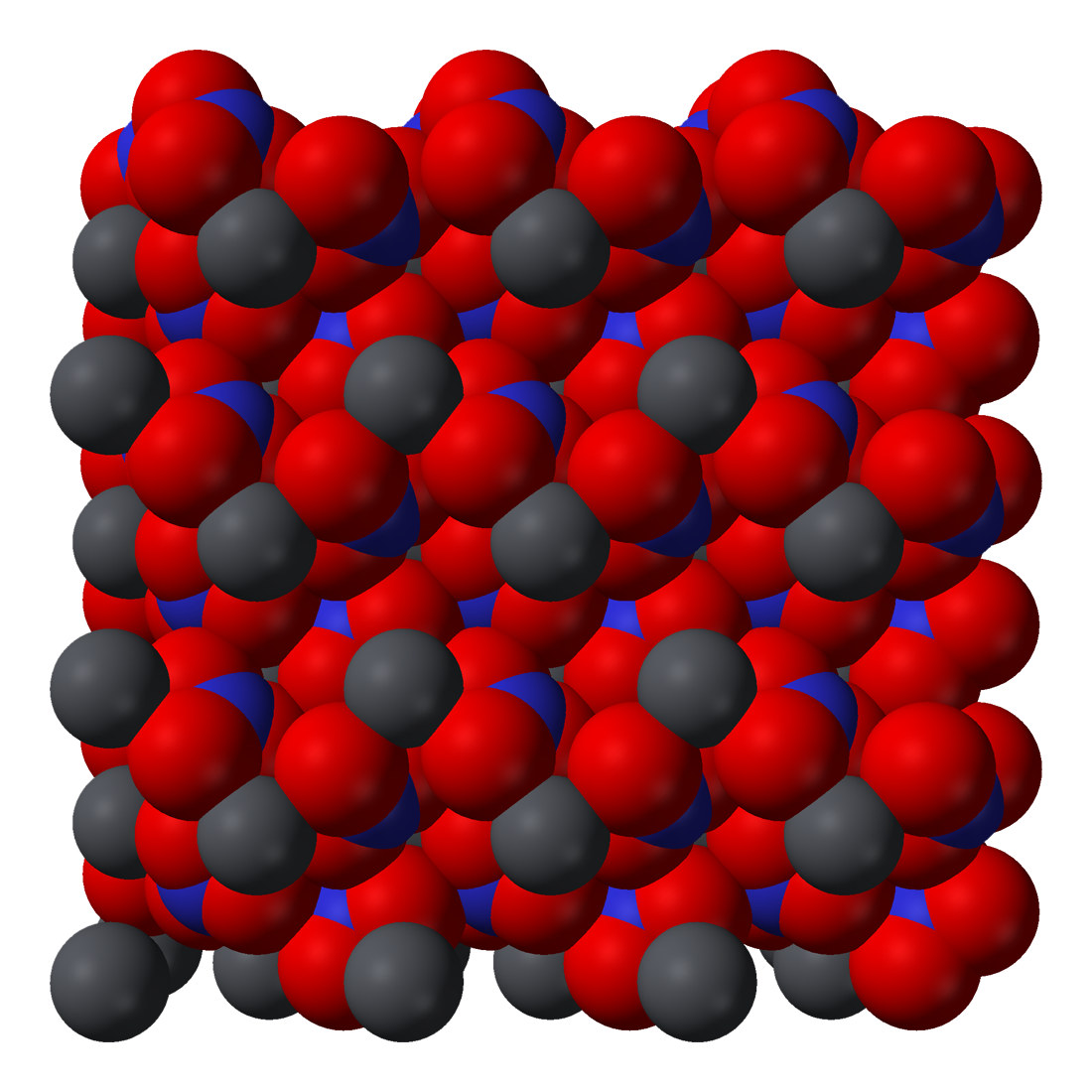

Identifiers
CAS Number	10099-74-8
3D model (JSmol)	Interactive image
ChemSpider	23300
ECHA InfoCard	100.030.210
EC Number	233-245-9
PubChem CID	24924
RTECS number	OG2100000
UNII	6E5P1699FI
UN number	1469
CompTox Dashboard (EPA)	DTXSID2035069
- InChI: InChI=1S/2NO3.Pb/c2*2-1(3)4;/q2*-1;+2 Key: RLJMLMKIBZAXJO-UHFFFAOYSA-N
- SMILES: [N+](=O)([O-])[O-].[N+](=O)([O-])[O-].[Pb+2]

Properties
Chemical formula	Pb(NO_{3})_{2}
Molar mass	331.2 g·mol^{−1}
Appearance	colorless or white
Density	4.53 g/cm^{3}
Melting point	470 °C (878 °F; 743 K) decomposes
Solubility in water	376.5 g/L (0 °C (32 °F; 273 K)); 597 g/L (25 °C (77 °F; 298 K)); 1270 g/L (100 °C (212 °F; 373 K))
Magnetic susceptibility (χ)	−74×10^{−6} cm^{3}/mol
Refractive index (n_{D})	1.782

Structure
Crystal structure	Face-centred cubic, cP36
Space group	Pa3̅, No. 205
Lattice constant	a = 0.78586 nm
Lattice volume (V)	0.4853 nm^{3}
Formula units (Z)	4

Thermochemistry
Std enthalpy of formation (Δ_{f}H^{⦵}_{298})	-451.9 kJ/mol

Hazards
- GHS labelling
Pictograms	(GHS03: Oxidizing) (GHS05: Corrosive) (GHS07: Exclamation mark) (GHS08: Health hazard) (GHS09: Environmental hazard)
Signal word	Danger
Hazard statements	H272, H302+H332, H317, H318, H332, H351, H360Df, H372, H373, H410
Precautionary statements	P203, P210, P220, P260, P264+P265, P270, P271, P272, P273, P280, P301+P317, P302+P352, P304+P340, P305+P351+P338, P317, P318, P319, P321, P330, P333+P317, P362+P364, P370+P378, P391, P405, P501
NFPA 704 (fire diamond)	2 0 2 OX
Threshold limit value (TLV)	0.05 mg/m^{3} (TWA)
- Lethal dose or concentration (LD, LC)
LD_{50} (median dose)	93 mg/kg (rat, oral)
LD_{Lo} (lowest published)	500 mg/kg (guinea pig, oral)
- NIOSH (US health exposure limits)
PEL (Permissible)	0.050 mg/m^{3} (as lead)
REL (Recommended)	0.050 mg/m^{3} (TWA, 8h, as lead)
IDLH (Immediate danger)	100 mg/m^{3}
Safety data sheet (SDS)	ICSC 1000

Related compounds
Other anions	Lead(II) sulfate Lead(II) chloride Lead(II) bromide
Other cations	Thallium(III) nitrate Bismuth(III) nitrate
- Except where otherwise noted, data are given for materials in their standard state (at 25 °C [77 °F], 100 kPa). Infobox references

Lead(II) nitrate is an inorganic compound with the chemical formula Pb(NO_{3})_{2}. It commonly occurs as a colourless crystal or white powder and, unlike most other lead(II) salts, is soluble in water.

Known since the Middle Ages by the name plumbum dulce (sweet lead), the production of lead(II) nitrate from either metallic lead or lead oxide in nitric acid was small-scale, for direct use in making other lead compounds. In the nineteenth century lead(II) nitrate began to be produced commercially in Europe and the United States. Historically, the main use was as a raw material in the production of pigments for lead paints, but such paints have been superseded by less toxic paints based on titanium dioxide. Other industrial uses included heat stabilization in nylon and polyesters, and in coatings of photothermographic paper. Since around the year 2000, lead(II) nitrate has begun to be used in gold cyanidation.

Lead(II) nitrate is toxic and must be handled with care to prevent inhalation, ingestion and skin contact. Due to its hazardous nature, the limited applications of lead(II) nitrate are under constant scrutiny.

== History ==
Since the Middle Ages, lead(II) nitrate has been produced as a raw material for the production of coloured pigments in lead paints, such as chrome yellow (lead(II) chromate), chrome orange (lead(II) hydroxide chromate) and similar lead compounds. These pigments were used for dyeing and printing calico and other textiles.

In 1597, the German alchemist Andreas Libavius first described the compound, coining the medieval names of plumb dulcis and calx plumb dulcis, meaning "sweet lead", because of its taste. Although originally not understood during the following centuries, the decrepitation property of lead(II) nitrate led to its use in matches and special explosives such as lead azide.

The production process was and still is chemically straightforward, effectively dissolving lead in nitric acid and subsequently harvesting the precipitate. However, the production remained small-scale for many centuries, and the commercial production of lead(II) nitrate as raw material for the manufacture of other lead compounds was not reported until 1835. In 1974, the U.S. consumption of lead compounds, excluding pigments and gasoline additives, was 642 tons.

== Production ==
Lead nitrate is produced by reaction of lead(II) oxide with concentrated nitric acid:

PbO + 2 HNO_{3} → Pb(NO_{3})_{2}↓ + H_{2}O

It may also be obtained by evaporation of the solution obtained by reacting metallic lead with dilute nitric acid.

Pb + 4 HNO_{3} → Pb(NO_{3})_{2} + 2 NO_{2} + 2 H_{2}O

Solutions and crystals of lead(II) nitrate are formed in the processing of lead–bismuth wastes from lead refineries.

== Structure ==
Depictions of the structure of lead(II) nitrate
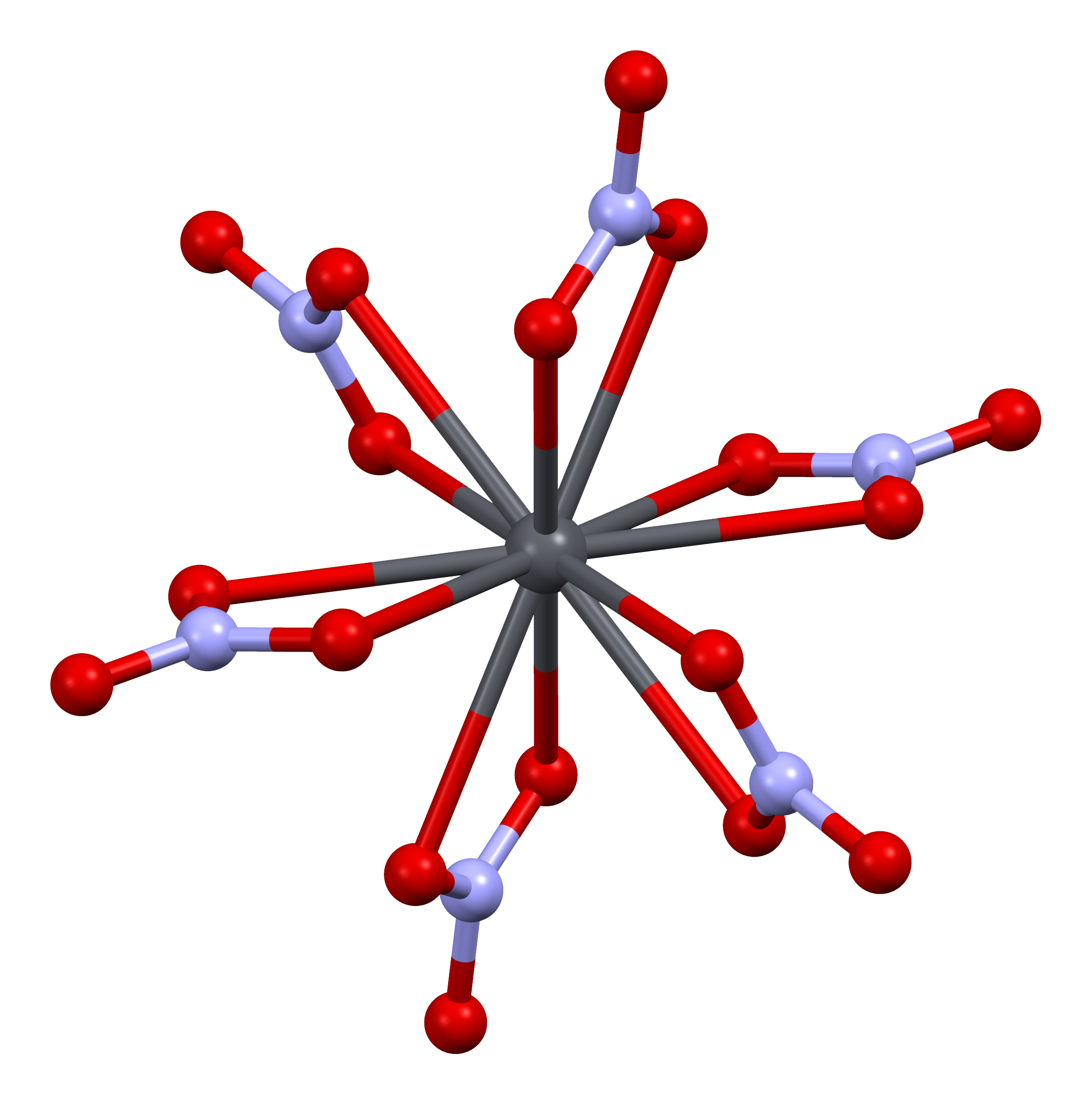
Coordination sphere of the Pb^{2+} ion

Crystal structure of Pb(NO_{3})_{2} [111] plane

The crystal structure of solid lead(II) nitrate has been determined by neutron diffraction. The compound crystallizes in the cubic system with the lead atoms in a face-centred cubic system. Its space group is Pa3_{Z=4} (Bravais lattice notation), with each side of the cube with length 784 picometres (7.84 Å).

The black dots represent the lead atoms, the white dots the nitrate groups 27 picometres (0.27 Å) above the plane of the lead atoms, and the blue dots the nitrate groups the same distance below this plane. In this configuration, every lead atom is bonded to twelve oxygen atoms (bond length: 281 picometres (2.81 Å)). All N−O bond lengths are identical, at 127 picometres (1.27 Å).

Research interest in the crystal structure of lead(II) nitrate was partly based on the possibility of free internal rotation of the nitrate groups within the crystal lattice at elevated temperatures, but this did not materialise.

== Chemical properties and reactions ==
Solubility of lead nitrate in nitric acid at 26 °C (79 °F). View source data.

Lead nitrate is an oxidizer and has been used as such in pyrotechnics.

Basic nitrates are formed when alkali is added to a solution. Pb_{2}(OH)_{2}(NO_{3})_{2} is the predominant species formed at low pH. At higher pH Pb_{6}(OH)_{5}NO_{3} is formed. The cation [Pb_{6}O(OH)_{6}]^{4+} is unusual in having an oxide ion inside a cluster of 3 face-sharing PbO_{4} tetrahedra. There is no evidence for the formation of the hydroxide, Pb(OH)_{2}, in aqueous solution below pH 12.

Solutions of lead nitrate can be used to form co-ordination complexes. Lead(II) is a hard acceptor; it forms stronger complexes with nitrogen and oxygen electron-donating ligands. For example, combining lead nitrate and pentaethylene glycol (shortened to EO5 in the referenced paper) in a solution of acetonitrile and methanol followed by slow evaporation produced the compound [Pb(NO_{3})_{2}EO5]. In the crystal structure for this compound, the EO5 chain is wrapped around the lead ion in an equatorial plane similar to that of a crown ether. The two bidentate nitrate ligands are in trans configuration. The total coordination number is 10, with the lead ion in a bicapped square antiprism molecular geometry.

The complex formed by lead nitrate with a bithiazole bidentate N-donor ligand is binuclear. The crystal structure shows that the nitrate group forms a bridge between two lead atoms. One aspect of this type of complex is the presence of a physical gap in the coordination sphere; i.e., the ligands are not placed symmetrically around the metal ion. This is potentially due to a lone pair of lead electrons, also found in lead complexes with an imidazole ligand.

== Applications ==
Lead nitrate has been used as a heat stabiliser in nylon and polyesters, as a coating for photothermographic paper, and in rodenticides.

Heating lead nitrate is convenient means of making nitrogen dioxide:

2 Pb(NO_{3})_{2} 2 PbO + 4 NO_{2} + O_{2}

In the gold cyanidation process, addition of lead(II) nitrate solution improves the leaching process. Only limited amounts (10 to 100 mg lead nitrate per kilogram gold) are required.

In organic chemistry, it may be used in the preparation of isothiocyanates from dithiocarbamates. Its use as a bromide scavenger during S_{N}1 substitution has been reported.

== Safety ==
Lead(II) nitrate is toxic, and ingestion may lead to acute lead poisoning, as is applicable for all soluble lead compounds. All inorganic lead compounds (but not elemental lead) are classified by the International Agency for Research on Cancer (IARC) as probably carcinogenic to humans (Category 2A). They have been linked to renal cancer and glioma in experimental animals and to renal cancer, brain cancer and lung cancer in humans, although studies of workers exposed to lead are often complicated by concurrent exposure to arsenic. Lead is known to substitute for zinc in a number of enzymes, including δ-aminolevulinic acid dehydratase (porphobilinogen synthase) in the haem biosynthetic pathway and pyrimidine-5′-nucleotidase, important for the correct metabolism of DNA and can therefore cause fetal damage.

== See also ==
- Pigments containing lead, such as white lead, Naples yellow, and red lead
