= Coastal plain =

Area of flat, low-lying land adjacent to a seacoast

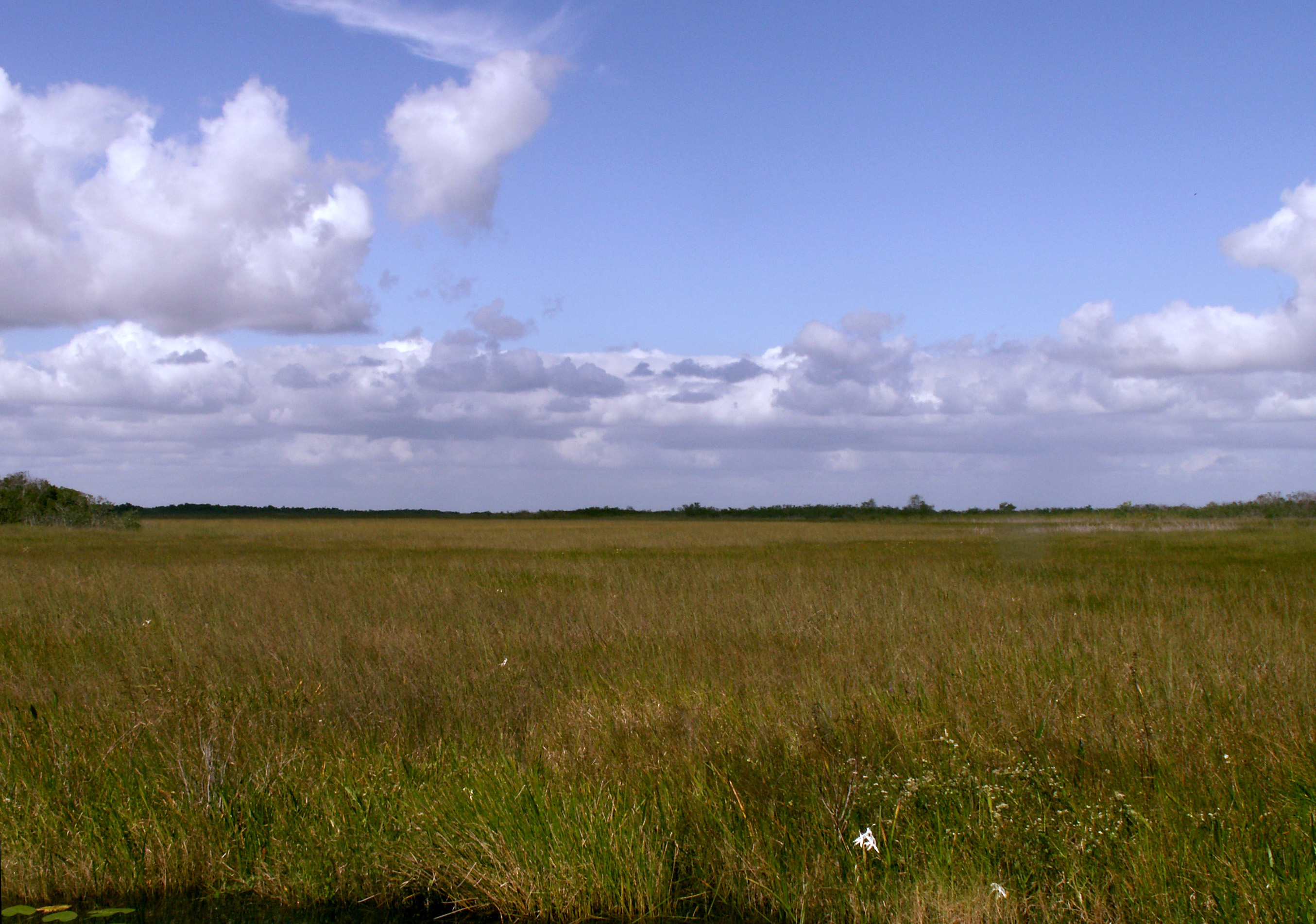
Florida's Everglades is a popular outdoor site on the Atlantic coastal plain.

A coastal plain (also coastal plains, coastal lowland, coastal lowlands) is an area of flat, low-lying land adjacent to a sea coast. A fall line commonly marks the border between a coastal plain and an upland area.

== Formation ==
Coastal plains can form in one of two ways; some begin as a continental shelf a flat piece of land located below sea level, and are created when the ocean level falls, exposing the land. Others develop when river currents carry sediment into the ocean, which is deposited and builds up over time until it forms a coastal plain. They are generally separated from the rest of the interior by proximate landforms, like mountains.

== Locations ==
Some of the largest coastal plains are in Alaska and the southeastern United States. The Gulf Coastal Plain of North America extends northwards from the Gulf of Mexico along the Lower Mississippi River to the Ohio River, which is a distance of about 981 miles (1,579 km). The Atlantic Coastal Plain runs from the New York Bight to Florida.

The Coastal Plains of India lie on either side of the Deccan Plateau, along the western and eastern coasts of India. They extend for about 6,150 km from the Rann of Kutch in the west to West Bengal in the east. They are broadly divided into the Western Coastal Plains and the Eastern Coastal Plains. The two coastal plains meet at Kanyakumari, the southernmost tip of the Indian mainland. The eastern coastal plain is located between The Bay of Bengal and the eastern Ghats and the western coastal plain is located between the Arabian Sea and the western Ghats.

In Australia, there exists the South East Coastal Plain in Victoria that includes the Gippsland Plain, the eastern portion of Melbourne, Otway Plain and Warrnambool Plain subregions. The Gippsland Plain features the depressed coastal and alluvial plains, barrier dunes and swampy flatlands. They mostly consist of grassland and grassy woodlands on yellow and grey textured fertile soils. Another is the Swan Coastal Plain in Western Australia, which includes the city of Perth. It is one of the distinct physiographic provinces of the larger West Australian Shield division.

== See also ==
- Alluvial plain
- Atlantic Plain
- Coastal plains of Chile
- Israeli coastal plain
- Mississippi embayment
- North European Plain
