= Pan de Azúcar Formation =

Geological formation in Chile

- Stratigraphic range: Hettangian-Sinemurian; ~201–191 Ma
- Type: Geological formation
- Underlies: La Negra Formation
- Overlies: Cifuncho Formation
- Thickness: 700 m (2,300 ft)

Lithology
- Primary: Sandstone, tuff, mudstone, limestone

Location
- Coordinates: 25.6°S 70.5°W
- Region: Antofagasta Region
- Country: Chile
- Pan de Azúcar Formation (Chile)

Pan de Azúcar Formation (Spanish: Formación Pan de Azúcar, Sugar-loaf formation) is a geologic formation of Hettangian–Sinemurian (Jurassic) age made up of chiefly by sandstone, tuff, mudstone and limestone. The formation is located in the Coast Range of northern Chile. The formation interdigitates and is coeval with the Posada de los Hidalgo Formation. It concordantly overlies the Cifuncho Formation and is overlain by the La Negra Formation.

At least one location the formation is intruded by a roughly coeval dacite dyke which adds to the evidence that the formation was coeval with the early stages of "Andean" volcanism.
