= Urban Wetlands Law =

Chilean law regulating urban wetlands

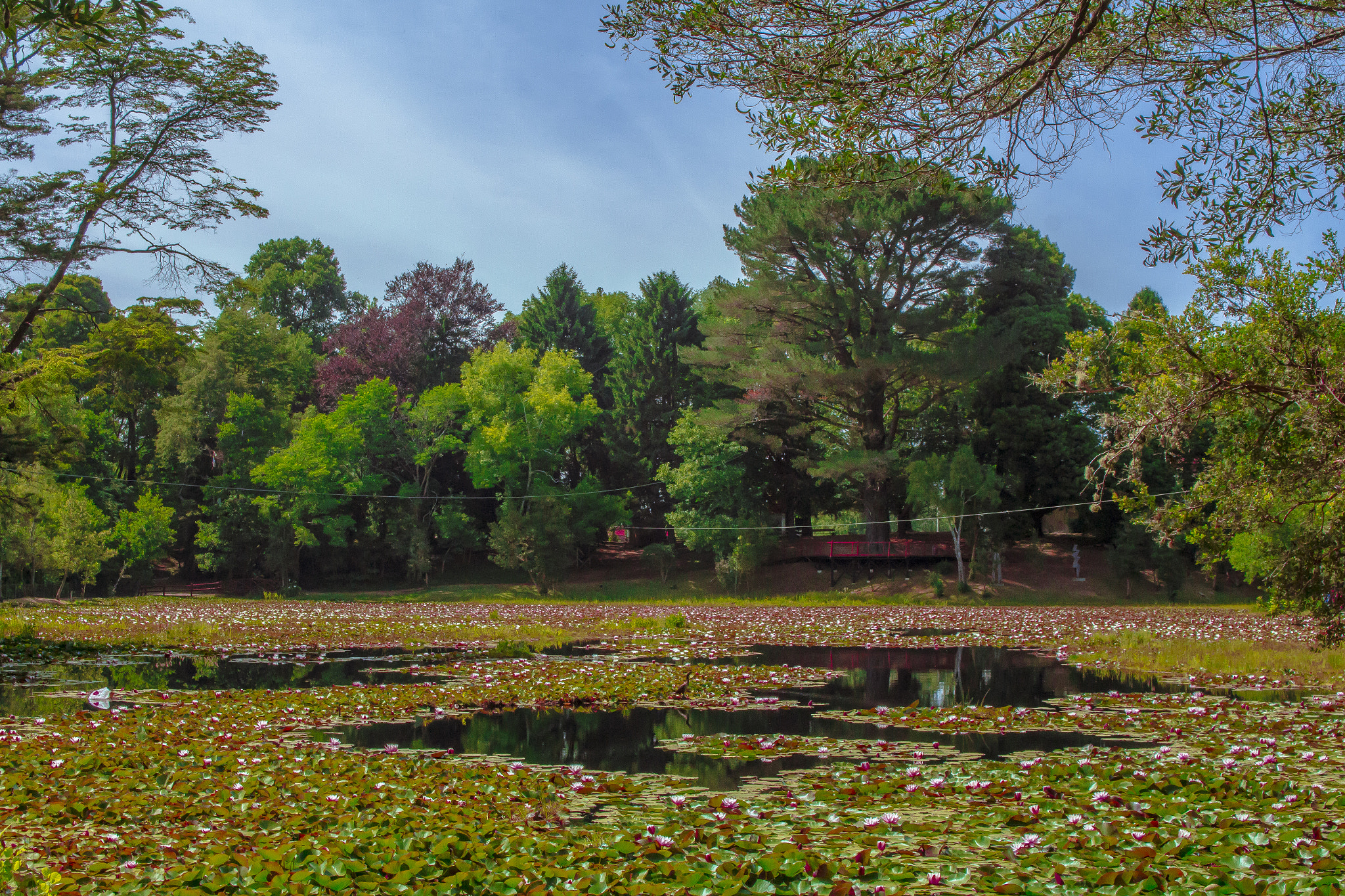
Laguna de los lotos in Parque Saval, an urban wetland in Valdivia.

Urban Wetlands Law (Spanish: Ley de Humedales Urbanos) is a Chilean law regulating wetlands in urban areas. The law intends to provide a set of "minimal criteria for the sustainability of urban wetlands, safeguarding its ecological characteristics and their functioning, and to maintain the hydrological regime, both on surface and under the ground". (Note: Este Reglamento tiene por objeto establece los criterios mínimos para la sustentabilidad de los humedales urbanos, para el resguardo de sus características ecológicas y su funcionamiento, y la mantención del régimen hidrológico, tanto superficial como subterráneo, integrando las dimensiones sociales, económicas y ambientales.)

At the request of municipal government the law allows for the Ministry of the Environment to declare official urban wetlands. The Ministry of the Environment can also declare official urban wetlands by its own initiative.

The law modidies the General Environmental Law (Ley 19300) and the General Law on Urbanism and Constructions (Decreto 458) as to consider either wetlands in general or urban wetlands in their provisions.

As of July 2023 about hundred urban wetlands had been legally established, yet in eleven cases the declaration had been challenged and rejected. Also by July 2023, the declaration of 18 urban wetlands remained in dispute. Real estate developers have been the main challengers to the legal establishment of urban wetlands.

== Scope of the law and definition of wetlands and urban wetlands ==
The scope of the law includes "marshes, swamps, peatlands or water-covered surfaces, be these either natural or artificial, permanent or temporal, stagnant or flowing, sweet, brackish or salt, including areas of sea water, whose depth a low tide does not exceed 6 m". (Note: ...la ley define a los humedales como aquellas extensiones de marismas, pantanos y turberas, o superficies cubiertas de agua, sean estas de régimen natural o artificial, permanentes o temporales, estancadas o corrientes, dulces, salobres o saladas, incluidas las extensiones de agua marina, cuya profundidad en marea baja no excede los 6 metros, y que se encuentren total o parcialmente dentro del radio urbano.) The law consider urban wetlands those wetlands that are wholly or partially within an urban area.

== See also ==
- Borde costero
- Chilean law on Sphagnum harverst
- List of cities in Chile
- List of towns in Chile
