= Valle de la Mocha =

Coordinates: 36°49′30″S 73°02′48″W

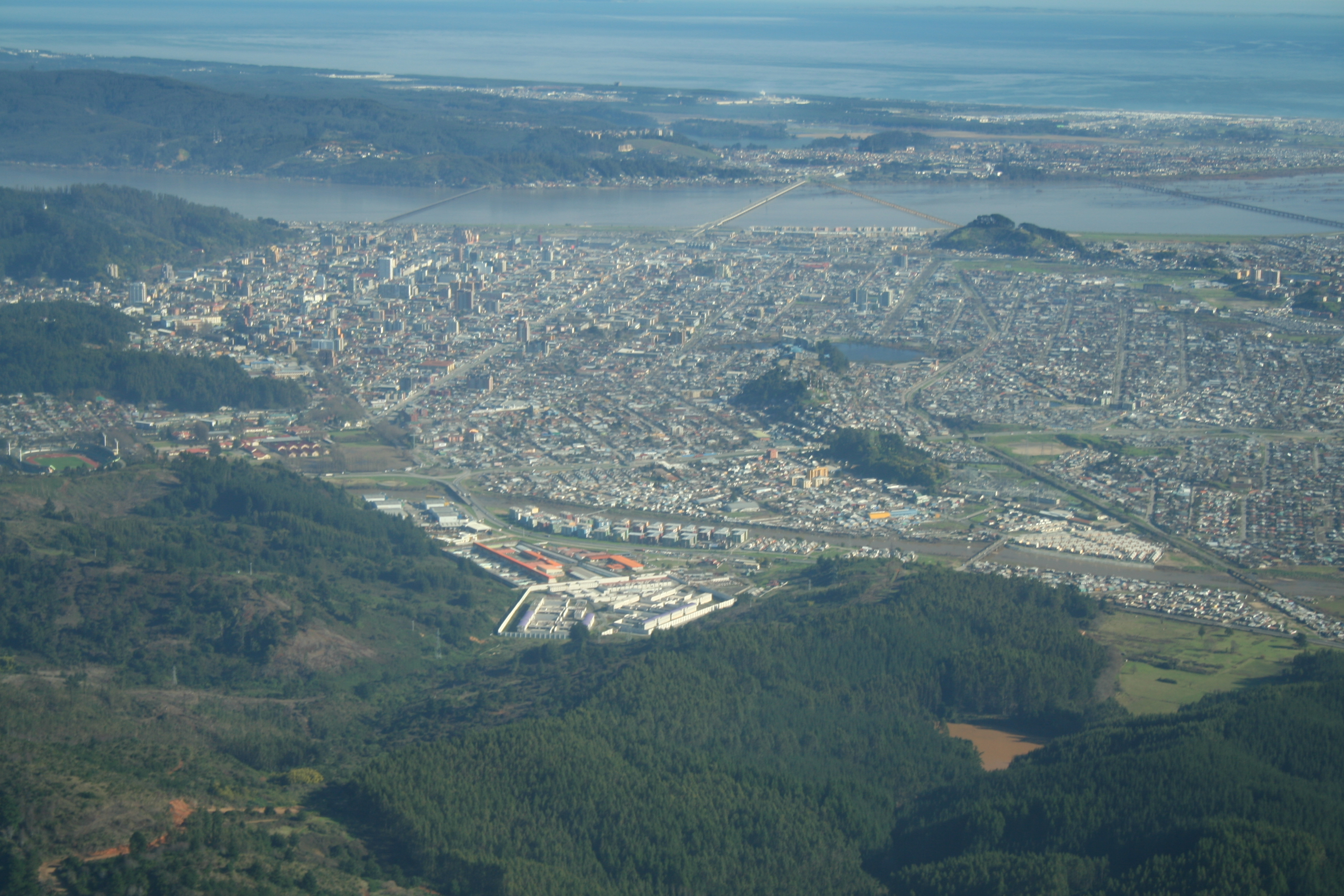
Valle de la Mocha upon which the city of Concepción is emplaced is one of various coastal plains in Chile.

Valle de la Mocha ("the Valley of Mocha") is a plain in Chile on the north shore of the Bio-Bio River that contained the reducción of Mapuche who were transported in 1685, from Mocha Island by Governor José de Garro; from which the valley and plain took its name. Governor Domingo Ortiz de Rosas transferred the old city of Concepcion to this site from Penco after the May 25, 1751 Concepción earthquake.

== See also ==
- Coastal plains of Chile

== Sources ==
- Francisco Solano Asta-Buruaga y Cienfuegos, Diccionario geográfico de la República de Chile, SEGUNDA EDICIÓN CORREGIDA Y AUMENTADA, NUEVA YORK, D. APPLETON Y COMPAÑÍA. 1899. pg. 450 Valle de la Mocha
