= Decrepitation =

Decrepitation can be:

- the noise produced when certain chemical compounds are heated
- the cracking, or breaking up of compounds (such as lumps of limestone) during heating. Such compounds may also include lead nitrate and calcine.

== Mineralogy ==
Decrepitation is one of the most accurate ways to calculate a mineral-deposit scale so that the analysis of the hydrothermal system is advanced and improved. Fluid inclusions are important in regard to decrepitation because they are the microscopic areas of gas and liquid within crystals that are decrepitated, or broken, with the application of heat.

When decrepitating the crystal or salt, the liquid pressure is released which can result in a crack. However, in some cases the fluid inclusions are not fully decrepitated, in which case other methods must be used. Despite this shortcoming, decrepitation is the preferred procedure for identifying minerals because it allows for the quickest and greatest number of inclusions to be measured.

The pressure necessary to spur decrepitation is reliant upon the size of the fluid inclusions; bigger inclusions decrepitate more easily at pressures between 700 and 900 atmospheres, while smaller fluid inclusions may require upwards of 1200 atmospheres, contrastingly, when fluid inclusions become even smaller, the amount of pressure applied will have no effect and decrepitation will not occur.

== Decrepitation in metamorphic rock ==
If the decrepitation begins at a temperature less than the temperature required to form the mineral, it is likely that the rate of decrepitation will speed up once the temperature exceeds that of the initial heating.

For metamorphic rocks, there are certain principles for measuring the decrepitations. What is known as D1 decrepitation, is classified as a temperature range of about 200-300 °C and is caused by the liquid phase which occupies intricate inclusions, as in hydrothermal minerals. D2 decrepitation is characterized by a starting heat range of about 300-700 °C, the temperature can also increase rapidly for a few hundred degrees, such as in solid inclusions. D3 decrepitation is continuously heated until the rate reaches its maximum out at about 350-450 °C, D3 decrepitation can be observed in carbonates and is defined by the effect of an inversion of the mineral. Once decrepitation of a D4 mineral is reached it should reach completion within a few degrees, which is seen in the decrepitation of quartz. Decrepitation as a result of decomposition is known as D5 decrepitation, it is characterized by a sharp upwards rate, a definite peak, and a sharp downwards rate, this can be detected by comparing the peaks of various minerals within a rock.
