= 2,2'-Bithiazole =

Names
- Preferred IUPAC name 2,2′-Bi-1,3-thiazole

Identifiers
CAS Number	13816-21-2
3D model (JSmol)	Interactive image
ChemSpider	715653
PubChem CID	819109
CompTox Dashboard (EPA)	DTXSID40902751
- InChI: InChI=1S/C6H4N2S2/c1-3-9-5(7-1)6-8-2-4-10-6/h1-4H Key: SMSLWFZHCONMGQ-UHFFFAOYSA-N
- SMILES: C1=CSC(=N1)C2=NC=CS2

Properties
Chemical formula	C_{6}H_{4}N_{2}S_{2}
Molar mass	168.23 g·mol^{−1}
Appearance	white solid
Density	1.82 g/cm^{3}
Melting point	102.5 °C (216.5 °F; 375.6 K)
- Except where otherwise noted, data are given for materials in their standard state (at 25 °C [77 °F], 100 kPa). Infobox references

2,2'-Bithiazole is an organic compound with the formula (H_{2}C_{3}NS)_{2}. The molecule consists of two thiazole rings linked by a C-C bond. Diverse isomers are possible depending on the carbon atoms that are coupled, but the 2,2' isomer is common. The compound was first prepared by Ullmann coupling of 2-bromothiazole using copper metal.

2,2'-Bithiazole is planar, according to X-ray crystallography.

== Occurrence ==
Bleomycin A2, a bithiazole-containing natural product

2,2'-Bithiazole itself is mainly of academic interest, but substituted, isomeric bithiazoles have attracted attention in medicinal chemistry. Naturally occurring bithiazoles are derived from cysteine, as are most naturally occurring thiazoles. Well-studied derivatives are the bleomycins, which feature 2,4'-bithiazole incorporated into glycopeptides. The cystothiazoles are another family of bithiazoles, but they feature 2,5-linkage. Luciferin contains a benzothiazole subunit linked to a thiazolidine (dihydrothiazole) via a 2,2' linkage.

2,2'-Bithiazole forms a variety of coordination complexes.
