= Mejillones Peninsula =

Coordinates: 23.29°S 70.51°W

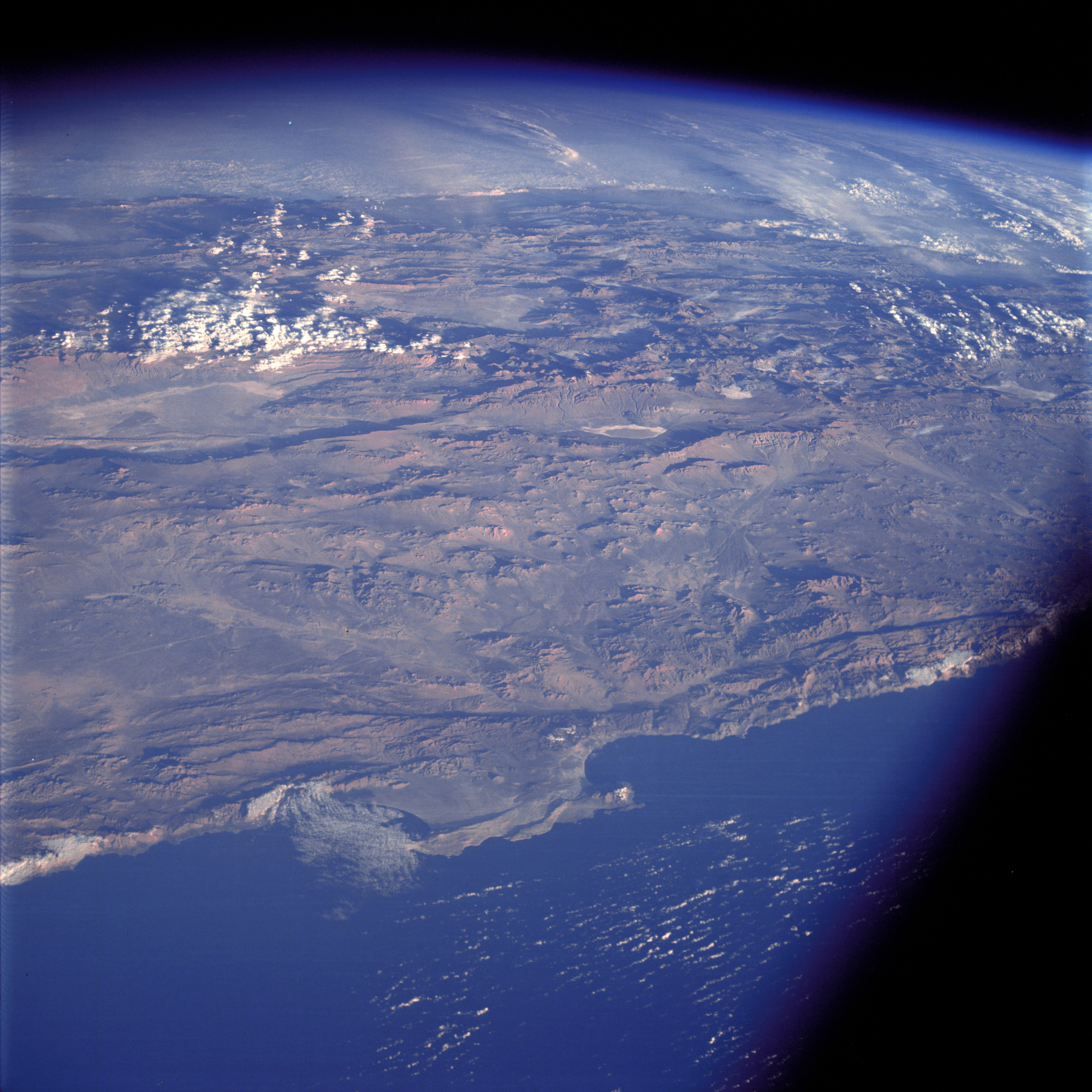
Satellite picture showing Mejillones Peninsula and part of Atacama Desert.

Mejillones Peninsula (Spanish: península de Mejillones) protrudes from the coast of northern Chile north of Antofagasta and south of the port of Mejillones.

The basement rocks of the peninsula are made of metamorphic and igneous rocks that formed in the Late Triassic plus plutons formed in the Early Jurassic. The eastern part of the peninsula hosts various normal faults. Extensional tectonics in the peninsula begun no later than in the Early Miocene and has resulted in the formation of two half graben basins. The uplift that the peninsula had in the Pliocene and Pleistocene has been attributed to subcrustal accretion in the subduction system.

== See also ==
- Arauco Peninsula
- Atacama Fault
- Coastal Cliff of northern Chile
- Guano
