= Borde costero =

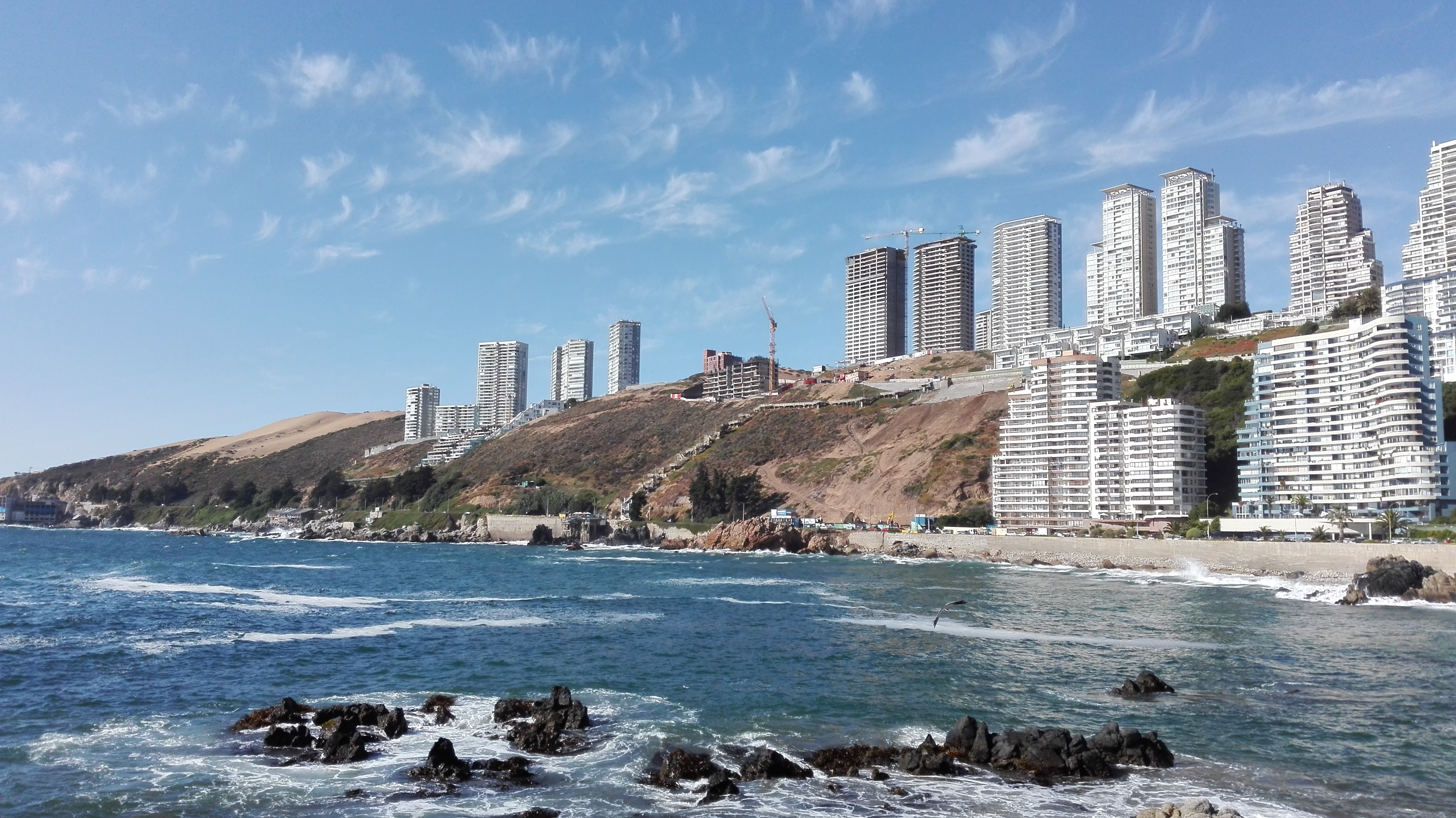
Urbanized area in a dune between Concón and Reñaca in Valparaíso Region.

In Chilean law borde costero (lit. "coastal border") is defined as; "the said strip of territory that include the public land, the playas, the bays, gulfs, straits and interior channels, and the territorial sea of the republic, [which] makes up a geographic and physical unit of special importance for the integral and harmonic development of the country." (Note: ...aquella franja del territorio que comprende los terrenos de playa fiscales, la playa, las bahías, golfos, estrechos y canales interiores, y el mar territorial de la República, conforma una unidad geográfica y física de especial importancia para el desarrollo integral y armónico del país.) The land area within the highest tide, or annual lake level high, and up to 80 m inland from this level is known as the playa (lit. "beach") of borde costero. The concept of the playa is based on article 594 of the Chilean Civil Code and this condition is independent of the actual ground type.

The decree formally defining borde costero and many of its regulations was issued in December 1994. Its scope is based on an interpretation of the Chilean Civil Code. Borde costero is considered a sui generis definition without equivalents in legislation outside Chile. The Subsecretariat of the Armed Forces is tasked with granting concessions in borde costero except in rivers and lakes that have not been declared navigable for ships over 100 tons where municipal administrations do so.

The Chilean regulations regarding borde costero have been criticized as failing to balance competing land use interests such as port facilities, real estate development, and environmental and landscape conservation, leading to a total dominance of the two former. Regulations are also criticized for lacking citizen participation mechanisms. The coast of Valparaíso Region in particular has been the site of socio-environmental conflicts, and environmental and landscape degradation attributed to real estate development allowed by the borde costero regulations. Various coastal wetlands and dunes in Valparaíso Region have been urbanized since 1994, for example, those in the area between Concón and Reñaca.

In May 2023 the National Commission on the Use of Borde Costero announced that the concept of borde costero will be replaced for that of zona costera. Reportedly the change has been made to widen the geographical scope of regulations beyond beaches and 80 m inland from the highest tide.

Additional decrees, laws and treaties regulating borde costero
Translated name	Code	Issued by	Year
Organic Law of the General Direction of the Maritime Territory and Merchant Marine	DFL Nº 292	Ministry of Finance	1953
On Marine Concessions	DFL Nº 340	Ministry of Finance	1960
Establishes Norms About the Acquisition, Administration and Disposal of the Assets of the State	DL Nº 1.939	Ministry of Land and Colonization	1977
Regularizes the Situation of Irregular Occupations in the Borde Costero it Points Out and Introduces Modifications to the Decree Law No. 1.939 of 1977	Ley Nº 20.062	Ministry of National Assets	1977
Substitutes the Navigation Law	DL Nº 2.222	Ministry of National Defense	1978
Establishes the Rewritten, Coordinated and Systematized Text of Law no. 18.892 General Law of Fishing and Aquaculture	D.S. Nº 430 de 1991	Ministry of Economy	1991
Regulation of Aquaculture Concessions and Authorizations	D.S. Nº 290 de 1993	Ministry of Economy	1993
On the General Rules of the Environment	Ley Nº 19.300	Ministry General Secretariat of the Presidency	1994
Regulation of the Areas of Management and Exploitation of Benthonic Resources	D.S. Nº 355	Ministry of Economy	1995
Prohibits the Access of Vehicles to the Beaches of the Coast	O.M. N°2 de 15 de enero de 1998	Ministry of National Defense	1998
Official Inventory of Lakes Navigable by Ships over 100 tons	D.S. Nº 11 de 1998	Ministry of National Defense	1998
Official Inventory of Rivers Navigable by Ships over 100 tons	D.S. Nº 12 de 1998	Ministry of National Defense	1998
Establishes the Official Inventory of Artisan Fishermen's Coves	D.S. Nº 240 de 1998	Ministry of National Defense	1998
Modifies the Official Inventory of Artisan Fishermen's Coves	D.S. Nº 337 de 2004	Ministry of National Defense	2004
Replaces Regulation of Maritime Concessions	D.S. Nº 2 de 2005	Ministry of National Defense	2005
Indigenous and Tribal Peoples Convention, 1989	D.S. Nº 236	Ministry of Foreign Affairs	2008
Creates Coastal Marine Spaces of the Indigenous Peoples	Ley Nº 20.249	Ministry of Planning	2008
Regulations of the Coastal Marine Spaces of Indigenous Peoples	D.S. Nº 134	Ministry of Planning	2008
Modifies the Official Inventory of Navigable Lakes (Cahuil)	D.S. (M) Nº 380 de 2008	Ministry of National Defense	2008
Modifies the Official Inventory of Artisan Fishermen's Coves	D.S. Nº 237 de 2009	Ministry of National Defense	2009
Modifies the Official Inventory of Navigable Rivers (Caucau)	D.S. Nº 56 de 2009	Ministry of National Defense	2009

== See also ==
- Fjords and channels of Chile
- List of lighthouses in Chile
- Urban Wetlands Law
