= Peperite =

Sedimentary rock that contains fragments of younger igneous material

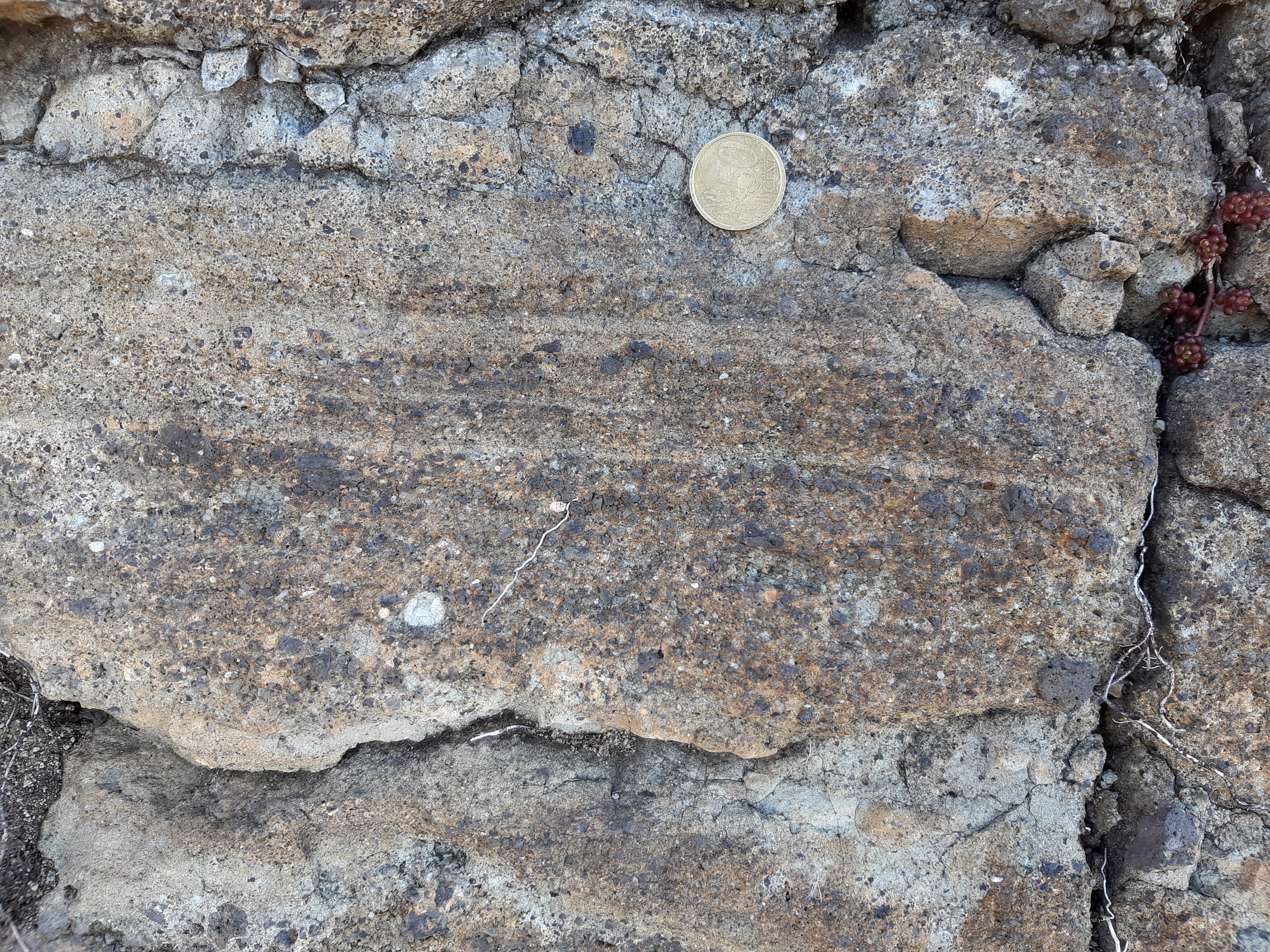
Peperite at Puy de Crouel in Auvergne, France

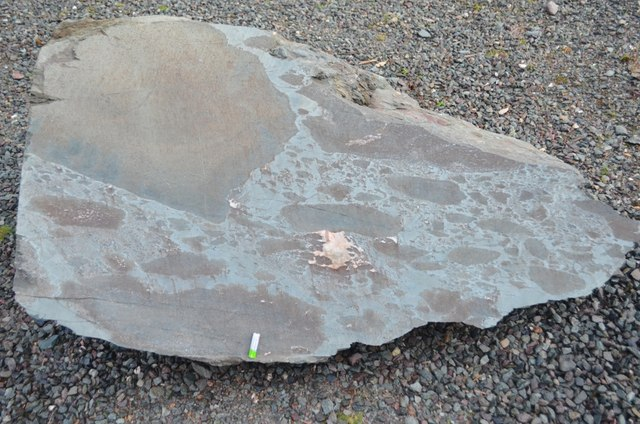
Peperite from Cumbria, England. This example was formed during the Ordovician Period and it is of andesitic composition.

A peperite is a type of volcaniclastic rock consisting of sedimentary rock that contains fragments of younger igneous material and is formed when magma comes into contact with wet sediments. The term was originally used to describe rocks from the Limagne region of France, from the similarity in appearance of the granules of dark basalt in the light-coloured limestone to black pepper. Typically the igneous fragments are glassy and show chilled-margins to the sedimentary matrix, distinguishing them from clasts with a sedimentary origin.

== Terminology ==
The term has been used to describe a wide variety of rocks that are interpreted to have formed by the interaction between magma and sediments. This usage has led to overlap with other terms such as hyaloclastite. In the 2002 edition of "Igneous Rocks" by Le Maître et al., the definition is given as "A local term for a tuff or breccia, formed by the intrusion of magma into wet sediments. Usually consists of glassy fragments of igneous rock and some sedimentary rock", while White (2000) defines peperite as "a genetic term applied to a rock formed essentially in situ by disintegration of magma intruding and mingling with unconsolidated or poorly consolidated, typically wet sediments. The term also refers to similar mixtures generated by the same processes operating at the contacts of lavas and other hot volcaniclastic deposits with such sediments".

== Formation ==
When magma comes into contact with wet sediment several processes combine to produce the mixture of sedimentary and igneous clasts which is characteristic of a peperite. These processes are required to produce both the disintegration or fragmentation of magma to form juvenile clasts and the mingling of these clasts within the sediment. Mechanisms proposed for the fragmentation of the magma include; fracturing due to the stresses associated with quenching, autobrecciation due to continuing flow in the cooling magma, pore-water steam explosions and magma-sediment density contrasts. The main mechanism suggested for mingling of the igneous clasts with the sediment is fluidisation, in the sense of particle support and transport by a fluid.

== Occurrence ==
Peperites are found world-wide in sediments with a significant water content at the time of formation associated with igneous rocks covering the compositional range from basalt to rhyolite.
