= Intra-arc basin =

Sedimentary basin within a volcanic arc

In geology an intra-arc basin is a sedimentary basin that exists amidst a volcanic arc. Being located next to volcanoes intra-arc basins tend to host volcano-sedimentary sequences. Cura-Mallín at the border of Chile and Argentina is an example of an intra-arc basin.

Some Neoproterozoic clastic metasedimentary rocks in the Central Eastern Desert of Egypt (CED) derived from bimodal volcanic sources appear to have been deposited in arc-related basins, including interarc or back-arc basins, intra-arc basins, and retro-arc basin of active continental margin.
