= Chromium oxide =

Chromium oxide may refer to:

- Chromium(II) oxide, CrO
- Chromium(III) oxide, Cr_{2}O_{3}
- Chromium dioxide (chromium(IV) oxide), CrO_{2}, which includes the hypothetical compound chromium(II) chromate
- Chromium trioxide (chromium(VI) oxide), CrO_{3}
- Chromium(VI) oxide peroxide, CrO_{5}
- Mixed valence species, such as Cr_{8}O_{21}

== See also ==
- Chromate and dichromate
- CRO (disambiguation)
