= Registration office =

A registration office commonly refers to a government agency at which compulsory information must be lodged.

The most common type of a registration offices are companies registration offices, business name registers, and trade register offices. In most countries, trade and company registers are freely accessible (list of company registers). Additional commerce registers include patent registers and trademark registers (e.g. U.S. Patent and Trademark Office).

There are also civil registers for registration of births, marriages and death. In countries with compulsory resident registration the term registration office is commonly short for resident registration office (e.g. German Meldeamt is short for Einwohnermeldeamt). Additional resident registers include immigration offices. Access to these registries is often limited, with information being publicly available only in the form of statistical overviews. There exist a multitude of registers and relevant offices that are incorporated by the government to allow for taxation and to monitor regulations. In some countries, the management of these register databases is handled by a separate agency or it is part of a larger body, e.g. aircraft registration or vehicle registration.

== See also ==
- personally identifiable information
