= CRO =

CRO, Cro, or CrO may refer to:

== Arts and entertainment ==
- Cro (musician) (born 1990), German rapper and singer
- Cro (TV series), a 1993 American children's animated series

== Occupations ==
- Certified Radio Operator (United States)
- Chief reputation officer
- Chief research officer
- Chief restructuring officer
- Chief revenue officer
- Chief risk officer
- Combat Rescue Officer, in the United States Air Force

== Businesses and organizations ==
- Cave Rescue Organisation, England
- Český Rozhlas, a Czech public radio broadcaster (station designator prefix ČRo)
- Civilian Repair Organisation, a British World War II aircraft repair scheme
- Commonwealth Relations Office, UK, 1947-1966
- Companies Registration Office (Ireland)
- Contract research organization, a company that provides support to the pharmaceutical, biotechnology, and medical device industries
- Crown Airways (ICAO code CRO)
- Conversion rate optimization, (marketing term)
- Companies Registration Office (disambiguation)

== Science and technology ==
- Cathode-ray oscilloscope
- Chromate and dichromate
- Chromium(II) oxide, with chromium in the +2 oxidation state
- Contract research organization or Clinical Research Organization, for pharmaceuticals
- cro, a Lambda phage repressor protein

== Law ==
- Civil restraint order, against vexatious litigation, UK
- Cro in early Scots law (see Leges inter Brettos et Scottos)

== Other uses ==
- Croatia (IOC and FIFA country code CRO)
- Conversion rate optimization, in internet marketing
- Credit Repair Organization, see Credit Repair Organizations Act

== See also ==
- Crow (disambiguation)
- Cro-Magnon
