= Josef Anton Hofmann =

American audio engineer

- Born: July 22, 1924; London, England
- Died: November 12, 2010 (aged 86); Waltham, Massachusetts, U.S.
- Education: Harvard University (AB, MA, PhD)
- Occupation: Audio engineer
- Years active: 1954–1989
- Known for: Hofmann's Iron Law
- Spouse: Trudi Takayama
- Children: 3
- Parent(s): Josef Hofmann and Betty Short

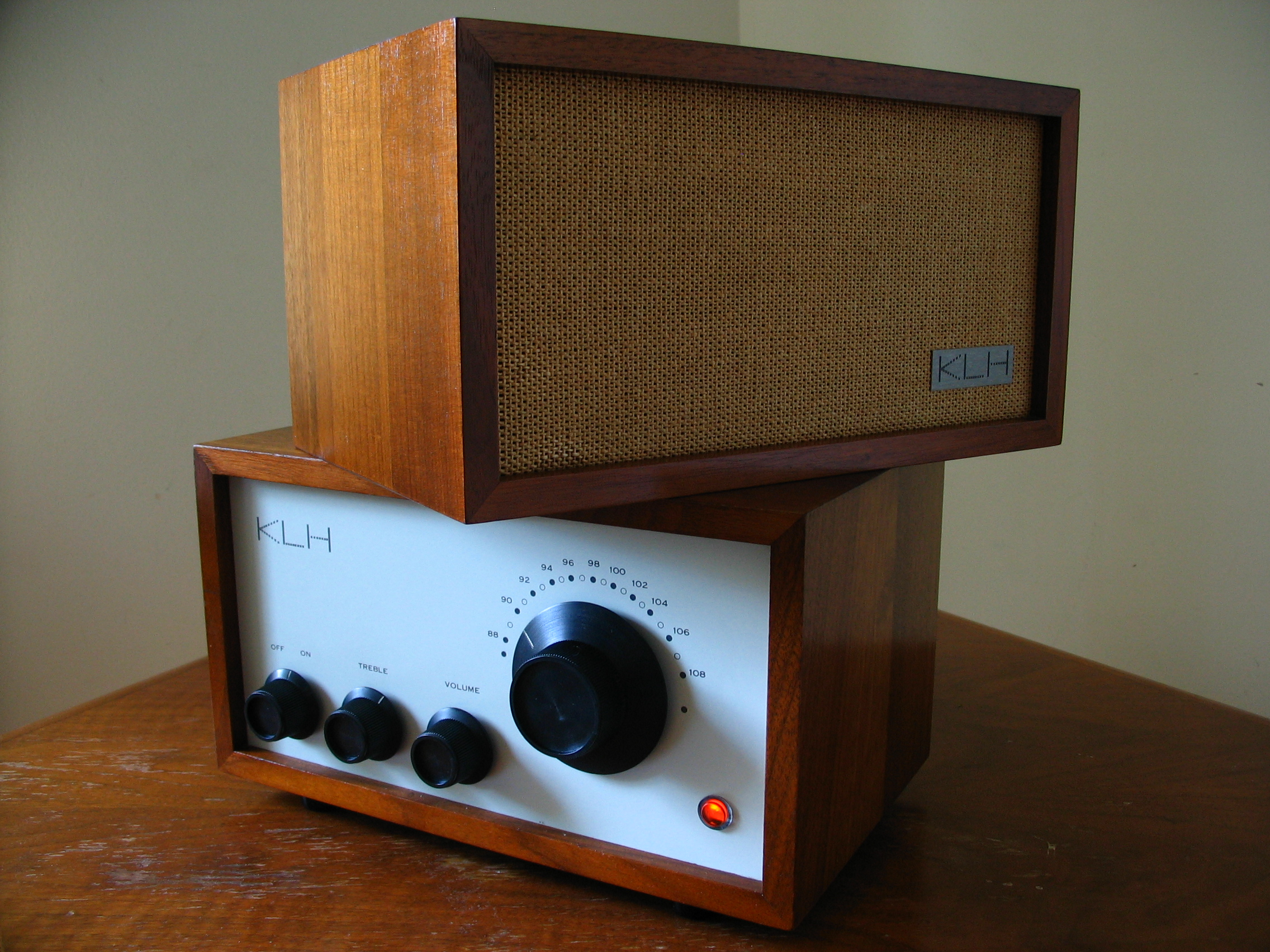
A KLH Model Eight radio

Josef Anton Hofmann (July 22, 1924 – November 12, 2010) was a London-born American audio engineer and speaker-system designer. He is known for Hofmann's Iron Law, and was a son of pianist Josef Hofmann.

== Biography ==
Hofmann was born in London in 1924, grew up in Philadelphia and Los Angeles, and graduated from Fairfax High School of Los Angeles in 1942. He studied at the California Institute of Technology and the University of Pennsylvania and worked on the Manhattan Project as a member of the United States Army. After World War II, Hofmann attended Harvard University, ultimately earning a doctorate there in 1953. Hofmann went on to have a 35-year career as an audio engineer, including work at Acoustic Research, KLH, and Advent Corporation, all in Cambridge, Massachusetts. Hofmann was the "H" of KLH, which he co-founded with Henry Kloss and Malcolm S. Low.

Hofmann and his wife, who were married in 1951, had three children. Hofmann died from lung cancer in 2010 in Waltham, Massachusetts.

== Hofmann's Iron Law ==
Hofmann theorized that when woofers are mounted in speaker enclosures, the designer would have to accept that there are three trade-offs. Hofmann argued that the designer had "...three parameters that cannot all be had at the same time. They are low-bass reproduction, small (enclosure) size, and high (output) sensitivity." Hofmann stated that designers could pick two of these three parameters, but in doing so, it would compromise the third parameter.

For example, a designer who wants good, deep low-frequency sound and high sensitivity can obtain these goals, but they will have to use a large speaker enclosure. Similarly, if a designer is forced by space constraints to use a very small cabinet, and they aim to get good, deep low-frequency sound, the sensitivity will be compromised (i.e., a small cabinet with deep bass would need a very powerful amplifier).
