= Speiermann, Weigel & Co =

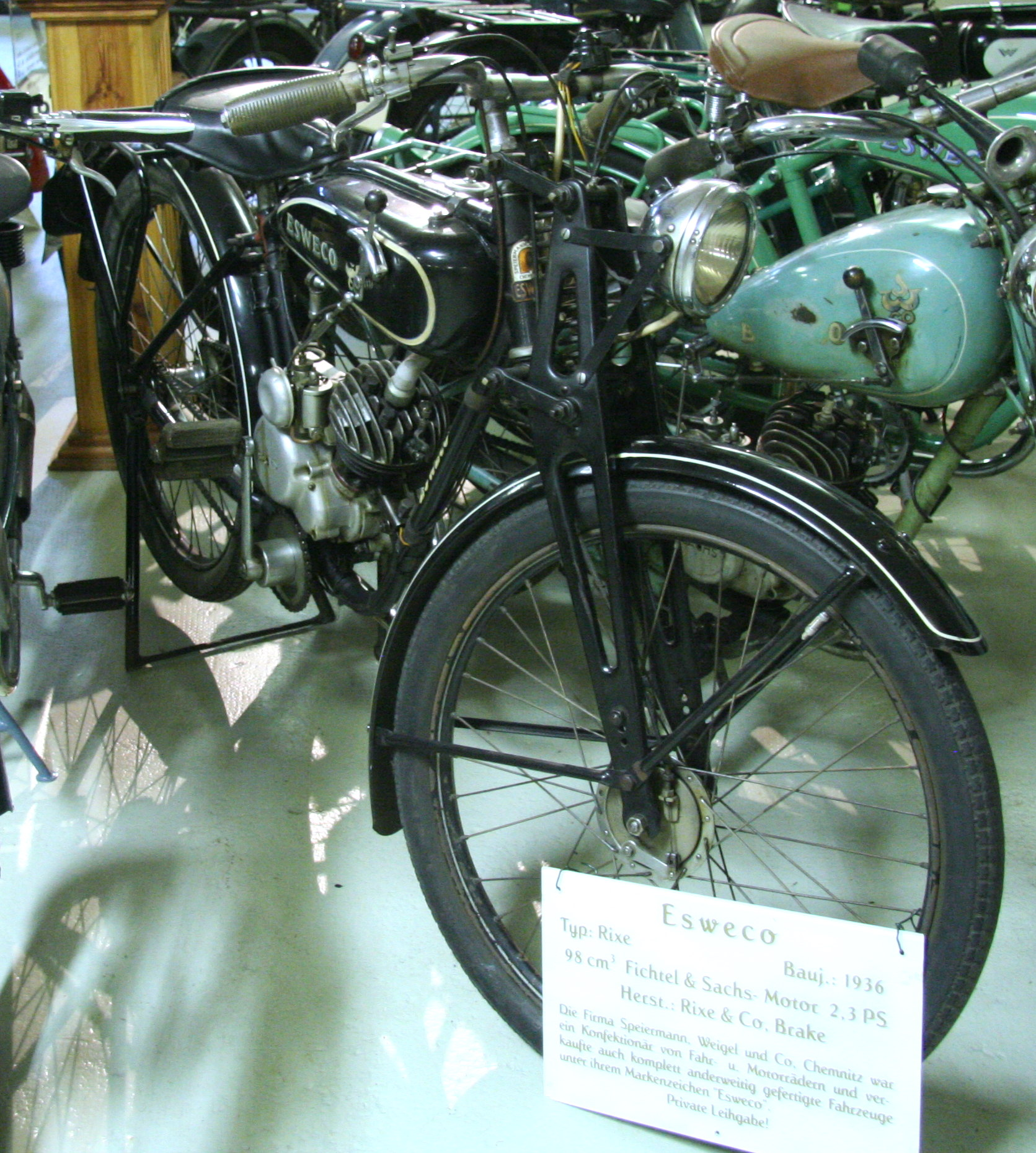
Exhibit at Museum für sächsische Fahrzeuge, Chemnitz

Speiermann, Weigel & Co was a manufacturer and wholesaler of bicycles and motorcycles based in Chemnitz, Germany.

== History ==
The company was founded on 1 July 1910 as "Speiermann & Weigel" by merchants Johann Karl Georg August Speiermann and Arno Walter Weigel. Originally trading bicycles and selling sewing machines and spare parts, it was soon renamed in 1912, following William Johannes Walther Schmidt's ownership of the company. In 1924, the company was registered as a trademark of Esweco, and began manufacturing bicycles, motorcycles and batteries.

In November 1950, Speiermann, Weigel & Co was removed from the commercial register.
