= Nonprofit organization laws by jurisdiction =

Legal forms and activity limitations

Laws regulating nonprofit organizations, nonprofit corporations, non-governmental organizations, and voluntary associations vary in different jurisdictions. They all play a critical role in addressing social, economic, and environmental issues. These organizations operate under specific legal frameworks that are regulated by the respective jurisdictions in which they operate. Such law can facilitate the workings of nonprofit organizations, but they can also hamper their functioning.

== Algeria ==
In Algeria, nonprofit organizations are regulated by Law No. 12-06 of 12 January 2012 on Associations. This law provides guidelines for the establishment, registration, and operation of nonprofit organizations. It sets out the requirements for formation, membership, governance, financial reporting, and dissolution of associations. Nonprofit organizations are required to register with the local authorities to obtain legal recognition and must comply with reporting obligations as stipulated by the law.

Algeria, during its third and fourth UN Human Rights Council universal periodic reviews, made a commitment to revoke Law No.12-06 of 2012 concerning associations and develop a new legislation. These reviews highlighted the significant limitations imposed by the existing law on the formation of associations, the registration procedures, funding, and the discretionary authority of the administration when it came to dissolving associations.

== Australia ==
In Australia, nonprofit organizations include trade unions, charitable entities, co-operatives, universities and hospitals, mutual societies, grass-root and support groups, political parties, religious groups, incorporated associations, not-for-profit companies, trusts and more. Furthermore, they operate across a multitude of domains and industries, from health, employment, disability and other human services to local sporting clubs, credit unions, and research institutes. A nonprofit organization in Australia can choose from a number of legal forms depending on the needs and activities of the organization: co-operative, company limited by guarantee, unincorporated association, incorporated association (by the Associations Incorporation Act 1985) or incorporated association or council (by the Commonwealth Aboriginal Councils and Associations Act 1976). From an academic perspective, social enterprise is, for the most part, considered a sub-set of the nonprofit sector as typically they too are concerned with a purpose relating to a public good. However, these are not bound to adhere to a nonprofit legal structure, and many incorporate and operate as for-profit entities.

In Australia, nonprofit organizations are primarily established in one of three ways: companies limited by guarantee, trusts, and incorporated associations. However, the incorporated association form is typically used by organizations intending to operate only within one Australian state jurisdiction. Nonprofit organizations seeking to establish a presence across Australia typically consider incorporating as a company or as a trust.

== Belgium ==
Under Belgian law, there are several kinds of nonprofit organization:

- Non-profit associations by membership, called Vereniging zonder winstoogmerk (abbreviated VZW) in Dutch, or Association sans but lucratif (abbreviated ASBL) in French, or Vereinigung ohne Gewinnerzielungsabsicht in German.
- International non-profit association, called Internationale vereniging zonder winstoogmerk (Dutch, often abbreviated IVZW) or Association internationale sans but lucratif (French, often abbreviated AISBL) for international nonprofit organizations.
- Stichting van openbaar nut (Dutch, abbreviated SON) or Fondation d'utilité publique (French, abbreviated FUP); a private non-membership organization for the common good.
- Feitelijke vereniging (Dutch) or Association de fait (French), an informal organization, often started for a short-term project, or managed alongside another NPO that does not have any status in law, and thus cannot purchase property, etc.

Vereniging zonder winstoogmerk (Dutch, abbreviated VZW) or Association sans but lucratif (French, abbreviated ASBL) or Vereinigung ohne Gewinnerzielungsabsicht (German, abbreviated VoG) is the legal term for a basic non-profit organization in Belgium and Luxembourg. It is a formal designation under Belgian and Luxembourg law, and organisations are entered in a register and allocated numeric identifiers.

=== Prominence ===
It is estimated that 497,400 employees work for associations without lucrative purpose in Belgium. The international associations without lucrative purpose employ an estimated 20,000 to 30,000 people in Belgium. Brussels is the second largest city in terms of housing of international associations after Washington, DC. The category includes among others professional associations, foundations and NGOs.

=== Legal reforms ===
In 2019, Belgium adopted new legal rules for private companies which also cover associations without lucrative purpose. The new rules allow an association without lucrative purpose to undertake commercial activities, although they are not permitted to distribute their profits.

Associations without lucrative purpose have been in the past criticized for their poor management practices. In response, the new rules also increase the liability for the administrators of an association without lucrative purpose with respect to the association.

== Burundi ==
In January 2017, Burundi announced an entry-into-force of a new law governing foreign NGOs. This law introduced ethnic quotas on foreign NGOs, designating that local staff must remain 60 percent Hutu and 40 percent Tutsi. In October 2018, Burundi's National Security Council announced an immediate suspension of a large number of foreign NGOs, with the exemption of hospital and school-based organizations. The suspended NGOs were required to present four documents reinforcing the organizations' commitment to banking regulations and ethnic staffing quotas, among others; or face deregistration.

== Canada ==
Canada allows nonprofit organizations to be incorporated or unincorporated. They may incorporate either federally, under Part II of the Canada Business Corporations Act, or under provincial legislation. Many of the governing Acts for Canadian nonprofits date to the early 1900s, meaning that nonprofit legislation has not kept pace with legislation that governs for-profit corporations, particularly with regards to corporate governance. Federal, and in some provinces (including Ontario), incorporation is by way of Letters Patent, and any change to the Letters Patent (even a simple name change) requires formal approval by the appropriate government, as do bylaw changes. Other provinces (including Alberta) permit incorporation as of right, by the filing of Articles of Incorporation or Articles of Association.

During 2009, the federal government enacted new legislation repealing the Canada Corporations Act, Part II – the Canada Not-for-Profit Corporations Act. This Act was last amended on 10 October 2011, and the act was current until 4 March 2013. It allows for incorporation as of right, by Articles of Incorporation; does away with the ultra vires doctrine for nonprofits; establishes them as legal persons; and substantially updates the governance provisions for nonprofits. Ontario also overhauled its legislation, adopting the Ontario Not-for-Profit Corporations Act during 2010; the new Act is expected to be in effect as of 1 July 2013.

Canada also permits a variety of charities (including public and private foundations). Charitable status is granted by the Canada Revenue Agency (CRA) upon application by a nonprofit; charities are allowed to issue income tax receipts to donors, must spend a certain percentage of their assets (including cash, investments, and fixed assets) and file annual reports in order to maintain their charitable status. In determining whether an organization can become a charity, CRA applies a common law test to its stated objects and activities. These must be:

- The relief of poverty
- The advancement of education
- The advancement of religion, or
- Certain other purposes that benefit the community in a way the courts have said is charitable

Charities are not permitted to engage in partisan political activity; doing so may result in the revocation of charitable status. However, a charity can carry out a small number of political activities that are non-partisan, help further the charities' purposes, and subordinate to the charity's charitable purposes.

== Ethiopia ==
On March 12, 2019, the government of Ethiopia enacted a new law on civil society organizations (CSOs), the Organization of Civil Societies Proclamation No. 1113/2019 (CSO Proclamation). The CSO Proclamation replaces the Proclamation of Charities and Societies No. 621/2009 (2009 Proclamation). The 2009 Proclamation was criticized by many NGOs as extremely restrictive, requiring NGOs to report to the Charities and Societies Agency; NGOs were also required to follow a '70/30' rule in which organizations were to allocate 70 percent of their budget to operational costs and 30 percent to administrative costs.

== France ==
In France, nonprofits are called associations. They are based on a law enacted 1 July 1901. As a consequence, the nonprofits are also called associations loi de 1901.

A nonprofit can be created by two people to accomplish a common goal. The association can have industrial or commercial activities or both, but the members cannot make any profit from the activities. Thereby, worker's unions and political parties can be organized from this law.

In 2008, the National Institute of Statistics and Economic Studies (INSEE) counted more than a million of these associations in the country, and about 16 million people older than 16 are members of a nonprofit in France (a third of the population over 16 years old). The nonprofits employ 1.6 million people, and 8 million are volunteers for them.

This law is also relevant in many former French colonies, particularly in Africa.

== Hong Kong ==
The Hong Kong Company Registry provides a memorandum of procedure for applying to Registrar of Companies for a Licence under Section 21 of the Companies Ordinance (Cap.32) for a limited company for the purpose of promoting commerce, art, science, religion, charity, or any other useful object.

== India ==
In India, non-governmental organizations are the most common type of societal institutions that do not have commercial interests. However, they are not the only category of non-commercial organizations that can gain official recognition. For example, memorial trusts, which honor renowned individuals through social work, may not be considered as NGOs.

They can be registered in four ways:

- Trust
- Society
- Section-25 company (Section 8 as per the new Companies Act, 2013)
- Special licensing

Registration can be with either the Registrar of Companies (RoC) or the Registrar of Societies (RoS).

The following laws or Constitutional Articles of the Republic of India are relevant to the NGOs:

- Articles 19(1)(c) and 30 of the Constitution of India
- Income Tax Act, 1961
- Public Trusts Acts of various states
- Societies Registration Act, 1860
- Section 25 of the Indian Companies Act, 1956 (Section 8 as per the new Companies Act, 2013)
- Foreign Contribution (Regulation) Act, 1976.

== Israel ==
In Israel nonprofit organizations (NPOs) and non-governmental organizations (NGOs) are usually established as registered nonprofit associations (Hebrew: עמותה, amutah; plural: עמותות, amutot) or public benefit companies (Hebrew: חברה לתועלת הציבור, Chevrah LeTo’elet Hatzibur or חל”צ, Chalatz, not to be confused with public benefit corporations). The structure of financial statements of nonprofit organizations is regulated Israel's Accounting Standard No. 5, and must include a balance sheet, a report on activities, the income and expenditure for the particular period, a report on changes in assets, a statement of cash flows, and notes to the financial statements. A report showing the level of restriction imposed on the assets and liabilities can be given, though this is not required.

Amutot are regulated by the Associations Law, 1980. An amutah is a body corporate, though not a company. Public benefit companies are governed solely by company law; if their regulations and objectives meet the two conditions specified in Section 345A of the Companies Act, they will in effect be amutot in all but name.

An amutah must register with the Rasham Ha’amutot (רשם העמותות, 'Registrar of Amutot'); a public benefit company must register with the Rasham HaChavarot (רשם החברות, 'Registrar of Companies'). Both are under the purview of the Rashot Hata’agidim (רשות התאגידים, 'Corporations Authority') of the Ministry of Justice.

The amutot are distinguished from the Ottoman Association which predated the State of Israel, and was established by the 1909 Ottoman Law on Associations, based on the French law of 1901.

== Japan ==
In Japan, an NPO is any citizen's group that serves the public interest and does not produce a profit for its members. NPOs are given corporate status to assist them in conducting business transactions. As at February 2011, there were 41,600 NPOs in Japan. Two hundred NPOs were given tax-deductible status by the government, which meant that only contributions to those organizations were tax deductible for the contributors.

== Kenya ==
Since 1990, the rights and obligations of nonprofits in Kenya have been regulated by the NGO Coordination Act, which in the eyes of many CSOs and even some politicians contains arduous and complex conditions for the sector. In 2013, the Public Benefits Organizations (PBO) Act was drafted as a replacement, aiming for a more transparent and efficient legal framework. However, it did not enter into force due to the general elections in March 2013.

Government-NGO relations deteriorated after the elections, primarily due to the involvement of Kenyan human rights NGOs in providing evidence against the new president and vice president to the International Criminal Court (ICC) regarding the post-election violence in 2007–2008. Local NGOs formed a protest coalition under the Civil Society Organizations Reference Group (CSORG) and adopted a two-track approach of lobbying MPs and mobilizing the public. They highlighted the negative socioeconomic impacts of the amendments, emphasizing the importance of the NGO sector for the Kenyan economy and service delivery.

The lobbying activities aimed to convince MPs that the amendments would harm their constituencies, while the public mobilization campaign sought to activate public pressure. Social media campaigns, media statements, petitions, and personal meetings were used to mobilize public support. External actors, including international non-governmental organizations (INGOs) and development partners, criticized the amendments and supported the socioeconomic narrative presented by the Kenyan NGO alliance. The proposed amendments to the PBO Act were rejected by the majority of parliamentarians, including those from opposition parties and the governing parties. The resistance from local NGOs, along with external support, played a role in this outcome.

== New Zealand ==
In New Zealand, nonprofit organizations usually are established as incorporated societies or charitable trusts. An incorporated society requires a membership of at least 10 people.

== Republic of Ireland ==
The Irish Nonprofits Database was created by Irish Nonprofits Knowledge Exchange (INKEx) to act as a repository for regulatory and voluntarily disclosed information about Irish public-benefit nonprofits. The database lists more than 10,000 nonprofit organizations in Ireland. In 2012 INKEx ceased to operate due to lack of funding.

== Russia ==
Russian law contains many legal forms of non-commercial organization (NCO), resulting in a complex, often contradictory, and limiting regulatory framework. The primary requirements are that NCOs, whatever their type, do not have the generation of profit as their main objective and do not distribute any such profit among their participants (Article 50(1), Civil Code). Most commonly there are five forms of NCO:

- Public associations – A public association is the form most comparable to an 'association' as used in international parlance. A public association is a membership-based organization of individuals who associate on the basis of common interests and goals stipulated in the organization's charter.
- Foundations – Foundations are property-based, non-membership organizations created by individuals or legal persons (or both) to pursue social, charitable, cultural, educational, or other public benefit goals.
- Institutions – The institution (uchrezhdeniye) is a form that exists in Russia and several other countries of the former Soviet Union. Like foundations, institutions do not have members. Unlike foundations, however, institutions do not acquire property rights in the property conveyed to them (Article 120, Civil Code, and Article 20, NCO Law). Moreover, the founders are liable for any obligations of the institution that it cannot meet on its own.
- Non-commercial partnerships – A non-commercial partnership (NP) (Article 8, NCO Law) is a membership organization pursuing activities for the mutual benefit of members. Therefore, assets that have been transferred to an NP as donations can be used for purposes other than those having public benefit.
- Autonomous non-commercial organizations – An autonomous non-commercial organization (ANO) (Article 10, NCO Law) is a non-membership organization undertaking services in the field of education, social policy, culture, etc., which in practice often generates income by providing its services for a fee.

== South Africa ==
In South Africa, nongovernmental organizations are governed by the Nonprofit Organisations Act of 1997 (NPO Act). The NPO Act has been generally characterized as a "good" law, seeking to enable and assist civil society organizations in the country.

Certain types of charity may issue a tax certificate when requested, which donors can use to apply for a tax deduction. Charities/NGOs may be established as voluntary associations, trusts or nonprofit companies (NPCs). Voluntary associations are established by agreement under the common law, and trusts are registered by the Master of the High Court.

Nonprofit companies (NPCs) are registered by the Companies and Intellectual Property Commission. All of these may voluntarily register with The Directorate for Nonprofit Organisations and may apply for tax-exempt status to the South African Revenue Service (SARS).

== Ukraine ==
In Ukraine, nonprofit organizations include non-governmental organizations, cooperatives (inc. housing cooperatives), charitable organizations, religious organizations, political parties, commodities exchanges (in Ukraine, commodities exchanges cannot be organized for profit) and more. Nonprofit organizations obtain their non-profit status from tax authorities. The state fiscal service is the main registration authority for nonprofit status.

== United Kingdom ==
In the UK a nonprofit organization may take any of the following forms:

- unincorporated association
- charitable trust
- charitable incorporated organisation (CIO)
- company limited by guarantee
- charter organization, including livery companies
- charitable company
- community interest company (CIC)
- community benefit society
- cooperative society

Of these, a charitable trust, charitable incorporated association, or charitable company is required to be charitable, while the others may be for a charitable purpose or not. Unincorporated associations may be for any non-profit purpose, but do not have legal personality and so cannot own property, enter into contracts, sue or be sued in their own name and the liability of their members and officers is unlimited. Charitable unincorporated associations are nonetheless common because they require no registration or other bureaucracy to set up and are not subject to stringent controls on the nature of their activities.

== United States ==
After a nonprofit organization has been formed at the state level, the organization may seek recognition of tax-exempt status with respect to U.S. federal income tax. That is done typically by applying to the Internal Revenue Service (IRS), although statutory exemptions exist for limited types of nonprofit organization. The IRS, after reviewing the application to ensure the organization meets the conditions to be recognized as a tax-exempt organization (such as the purpose, limitations on spending, and internal safeguards for a charity), may issue an authorization letter to the nonprofit granting it tax-exempt status for income-tax payment, filing, and deductibility purposes. The exemption does not apply to other federal taxes such as employment taxes. Additionally, a tax-exempt organization must pay federal tax on income that is unrelated to their exempt purpose. Failure to maintain operations in conformity to the laws may result in the loss of tax-exempt status.

Individual states and localities offer nonprofits exemptions from other taxes such as sales tax or property tax. Federal tax-exempt status does not guarantee exemption from state and local taxes and vice versa. These exemptions generally have separate applications, and their requirements may differ from the IRS requirements. Furthermore, even a tax-exempt organization may be required to file annual financial reports (IRS Form 990) at the state and federal levels. A tax-exempt organization's 990 forms are required to be available for public scrutiny.

=== Governance ===
The board of directors has ultimate control over the organization, but typically an executive director is hired. In some cases, the board is elected by a membership, but commonly, the board of directors is self-perpetuating. In these 'board-only' organizations, board members nominate new members and vote on their fellow directors' nominations. Part VI Governance, Management, and Disclosure, section A, question 7a of the Form 990 asks "Did the organization have members, stockholders, or other persons who had the power to elect or appoint one or more members of the governing body?"; the IRS instructions added "(other than the organization's governing body itself, acting in such capacity)".

== Zimbabwe ==
In February 2023, Zimbabwean President Emmerson Mnangagwa announced that he will sign into law the Private Voluntary Organization (PVO) Bill. The PVO Bill was introduced in 2021, seeking to restrict and supervise civil society in Zimbabwe.
