= Cromags =

Cromags may refer to:

- Cro-Mags, a hardcore punk band from New York City
- Kromaggs, a species of humanoid primates from the science fiction television show Sliders

== See also ==
- Cro-Magnon (disambiguation)
