= Magnon (disambiguation) =

A magnon is a collective excitation of the electrons' spin structure in a crystal lattice.

Magnon may also refer to:

== Places ==
- Magnon, Gabon, a village

== People ==
- Jean Magnon (died 1662), French playwright
- Leonor Villegas de Magnon (1876–1955), political activist, teacher, and journalist
- Magnon, the 19th-century landowner in Les Eyzies, France, on whose land Cro-Magnon Man was discovered

== Other uses ==
- Magnon Solutions, an Indian company

== See also ==
- Cro-Magnon, early humans
- Cro-Magnon (disambiguation)
