= Cro-Magnon (disambiguation) =

Cro-Magnon is a general term for European early modern humans.

Cro-Magnon may also refer to:

- the Abri de Cro-Magnon archaeological site
- the human fossils discovered there:
  - "Old Man of Cro-Magnon", "Cro-Magnon Man", the fossil Cro-Magnon 1
  - "Woman of Cro-Magnon", the fossil Cro-Magnon 2
- "Cro-Magnon Man", or "Cro-Magnons"; an obsolete term for anatomically modern humans in general

== Popular culture ==
- Cromagnon (band), a 1960s American band
- The Cro-Magnons, a Japanese rock band
- Cro-Mags, American hardcore punk band
- "Cro-Magnon" (Ally McBeal), a 1998 television episode
- "Cromagnon Man", a song by Snout
- "Cro-Magnon Man", a song by Squid

== See also ==
- The República Cromañón nightclub fire in Argentina
- Magnon (disambiguation)
- Cro (disambiguation)
