= Hashemite (mineral) =

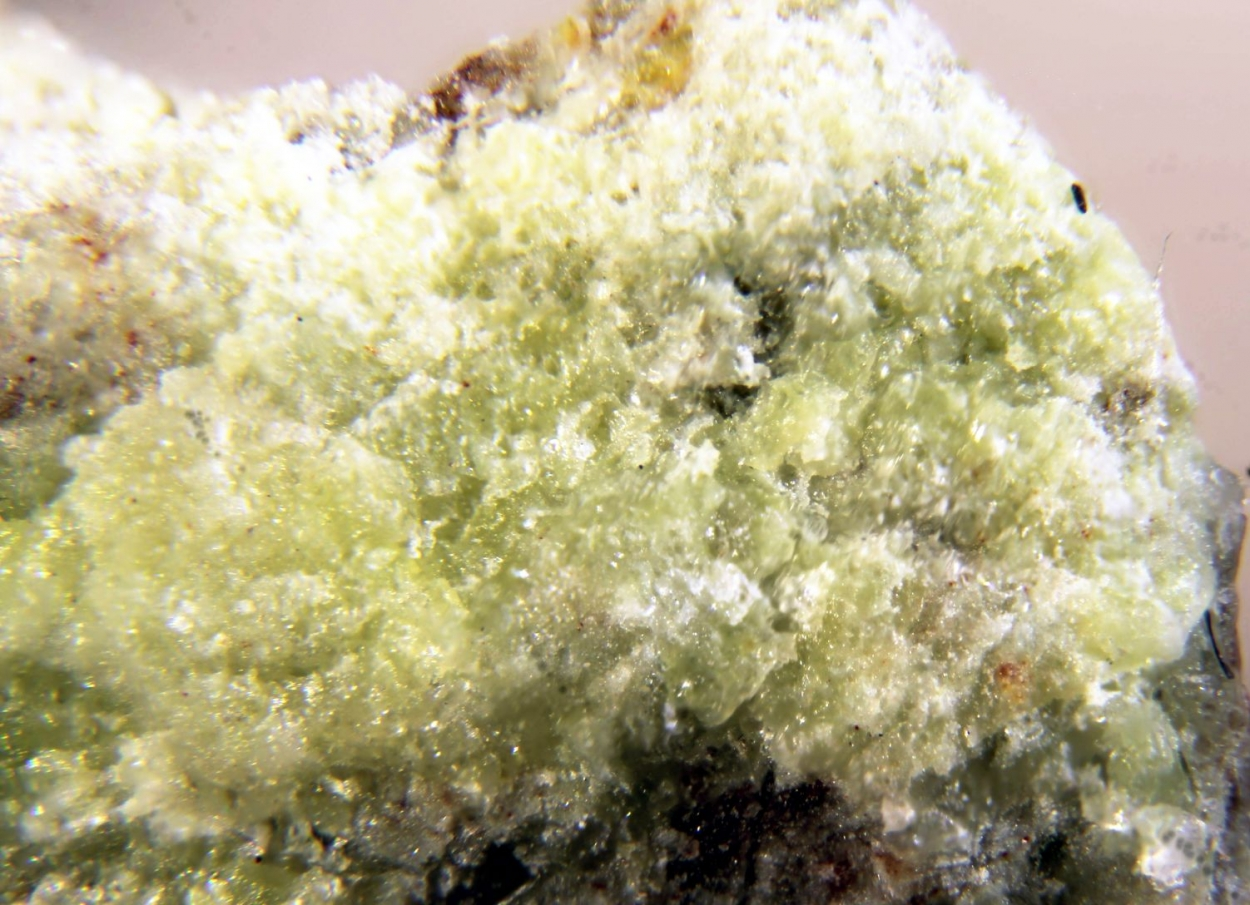
- Hashemite from the Lisdan-Siwaga Fault, Hashem Region, Amman, Jordan

General
- Category: Chromate minerals
- Formula: Barium Chromate Ba(S,Cr)O_{4}
- Crystal system: Orthorhombic

Identification
- Color: Brown to yellow
- Cleavage: Perfect {001}, good {010} {100}
- Mohs scale hardness: 3.5
- Luster: Adamantine
- Diaphaneity: Translucent
- Specific gravity: 4.54 - 4.59

Hashemite is a very rare barium chromate mineral with the formula Ba(Cr,S)O_{4}. It is a representative of natural chromates - a relatively small and rare group of minerals. Hashemite is the barium-analogue of tarapacáite. It is also the chromium-analogue of baryte, and belongs to the baryte group of minerals. Hashemite is stoichiometrically similar to crocoite and chromatite. Hashemite is orthorhombic, with space group Pnma. It was found together with chromium-bearing ettringite and an apatite group mineral in the Hatrurim Formation, known for the occurrence of rocks formed due to natural pyrometamorphism. Hashemite is named after the Hashemite Kingdom of Jordan.
