= Tivoli Audio =

American electronics manufacturing company

- Founded: 2000
- Founder: Tom DeVesto
- Headquarters: Boston, Massachusetts
- Key people: Paul De Pasquale (CEO)
- Products: Tivoli Audio PAL; Tivoli Audio Model One; Tivoli Audio SongBook; Tivoli Audio Model One Digital
- Number of employees: 30+
- Website: tivoliaudio.com

Tivoli Audio Inc. is an American company that produces radios. It was founded in 2000 by Tom DeVesto and Henry Kloss.

== History ==
The company was founded in Massachusetts by Henry Kloss, an audio engineer, and Tom DeVesto, an entrepreneur. Their first product, the Model One, was designed to receive FM radio signals in congested urban locations and distant or low-power stations, as Kloss noted; the mid-60s wave of Japanese radios struggled to do this. Kloss died in 2002, but the company continued to operate. By 2006, Tivoli Audio was selling products in over 30 countries.

The company has had partnerships with Ritz-Carlton, Marriott Hotels, and Ace Hotels. It also partnered with Supreme in 2018 for a limited-edition model.

In 2016, Tivoli Audio launched the ART Wireless collection with features such as Wi-Fi streaming and Spotify Connect. As of 2019, Tivoli Audio opened a flagship showroom and shop on Boston's Newbury Street.

As of 2024, Paul De Pasquale is Chief Executive Officer and the Designer.

== Products ==
After the Model One, the next decade saw several new releases, such as the PAL (Portable Audio Laboratory), Model Three (Alarm Clock Radio), and the All-In-One Music System. This range of products was sold in Scandinavian DAB+ countries, such as Denmark and Norway following the PAL+ in 2011. In 2016, Tivoli Audio released the ART Collection.

Tivoli has collaborated with brands like Coach, Cappellini, Anthropologie, NPR, and Supreme to produce collections.

== Product release timeline ==
- 2000: Model One AM/FM Radio
- 2001: Model Two AM/FM Radio Stereo with subwoofer and CD player
- 2002: PAL (Portable Audio Laboratory)
- 2003: Model Three Alarm Clock Radio with subwoofer and extra speaker
- 2004: Songbook AM/FM Alarm clock travel radio
- 2005: iSongbook Portable Music System with built-in iPod dock
- 2006: Music System All-in-one stereo system
- 2007: iYiYi High-Fidelity stereo system for iPod
- 2008: Networks Global Audio System with internet capabilities, stereo speaker and CD player
- 2010: Model 10 AM/FM clock radio; The Connector iPod dock
- 2011: PAL+ Portable radio with DAB/DAB+/FM
- 2012: Model One Bluetooth, PAL BT, Model Three Bluetooth, BlueCon Music Receiver with Bluetooth connectivity, redesign of the Music System to include Bluetooth (Music System BT) and DAB+ (Music System+)
- 2013: Albergo AM/FM clock radio with Bluetooth as well as the DAB+ variant, the Albergo+
- 2014: Music System Three portable Hi-Fi system with AM/FM and Bluetooth connectivity as well as the DAB+ variant (Music System Three+), PAL+BT Portable radio with DAB/DAB+/FM/Bluetooth
- 2016: ART Collection Orb/Sphera, Cube, ConX, limited edition PAL BT GLO
- 2017: ART Collection Model One Digital, Model One Digital+, Model Sub (WiFi), Model CD (WiFi)
- 2018: PAL+BT redesigns and limited edition models, Tivoli Go line: Andiamo Bluetooth Speaker & Fonico Wireless Stereo Earbuds, Music System Home Hi-Fi system with Amazon Alexa/CD/FM/DAB+, WiFi and Bluetooth connectivity (DAB+ in selected countries only)
- 2019: Revive (desktop lamp and Bluetooth speaker with wireless phone charging)
