= Tivoli Audio PAL =

Portable radio model

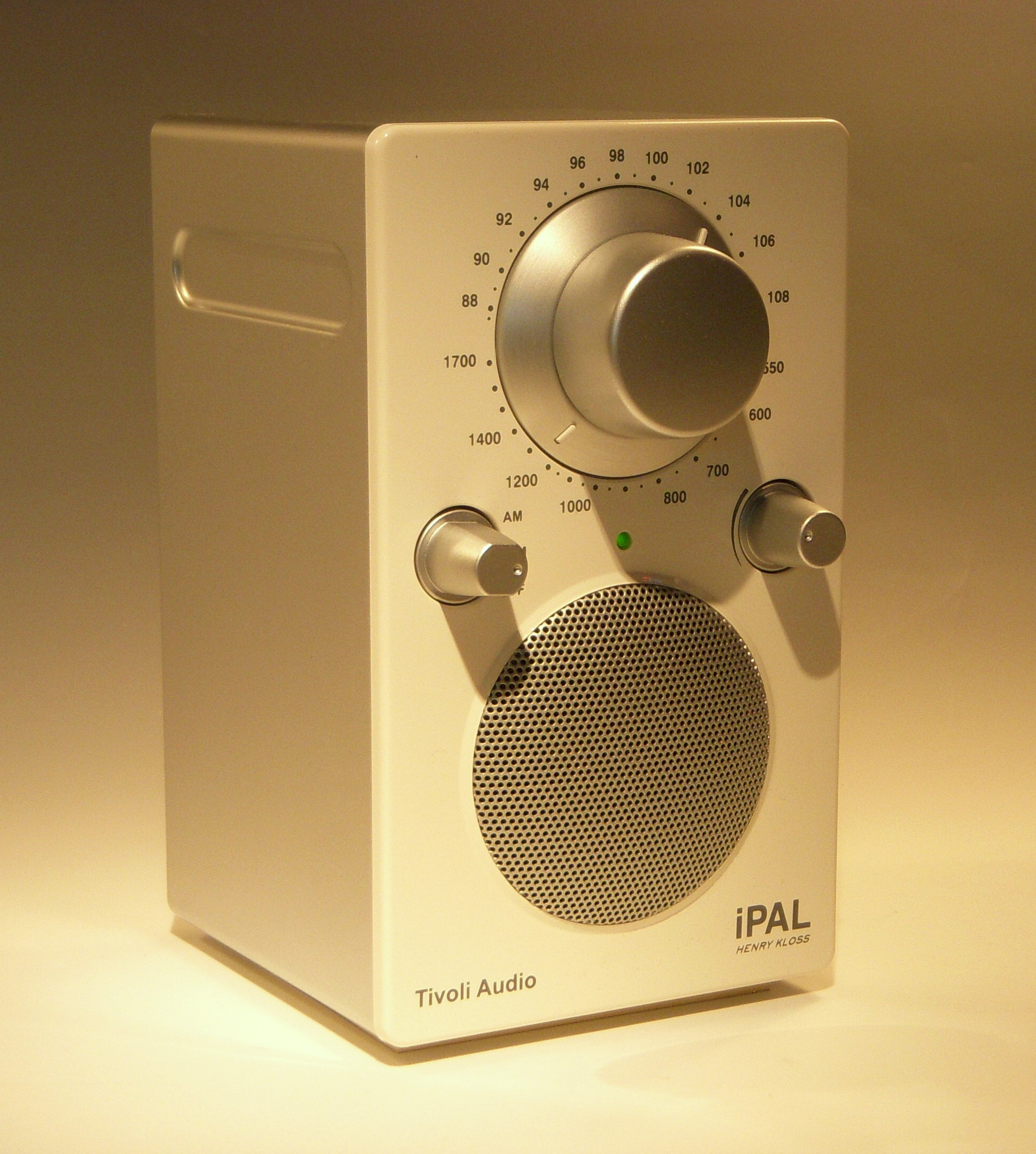
Tivoli Audio PAL
Features
I/O	3,5 mm stereo output 3,5 mm stereo AUX; DC adaptor port (12V)

The PAL or Portable Audio Laboratory is a radio produced by Tivoli Audio. It was designed by Henry Kloss (1929–2002). Supporting both the FM and AM bands, it was designed as an outdoor, portable version of the earlier Model One.

== Features ==
- 2.5" magnetically shielded, treated full-range speaker
- 5:1 ratio analog tuning dial
- AC/DC operation (External AC power supply/charger included)
- Auxiliary Input
- Battery status indicator
- Built-in battery charger
- Built-in telescoping FM antenna
- Designers colors available
- Henry Kloss Analog AM/FM Tuner with AFC
- NiMH rechargeable battery pack (Included)
- One Year Warranty
- Optional Carry Bag
- Portable
- Stereo Headphone Output
- Water-resistant cabinet
