= KLH (company) =

American audio company

KLH Audio
- Formerly: KLH Research and Development Corporation; KLH Audio Systems
- Industry: Audio electronics
- Founded: 1957; 69 years ago in Cambridge, Massachusetts, U.S.
- Founders: Henry Kloss; Malcolm S. Low; Josef Anton Hofmann
- Headquarters: Denver, Colorado, U.S.
- Owner: Innovative Technology Electronics, LLC, DBA Victrola.
- Website: klhaudio.com

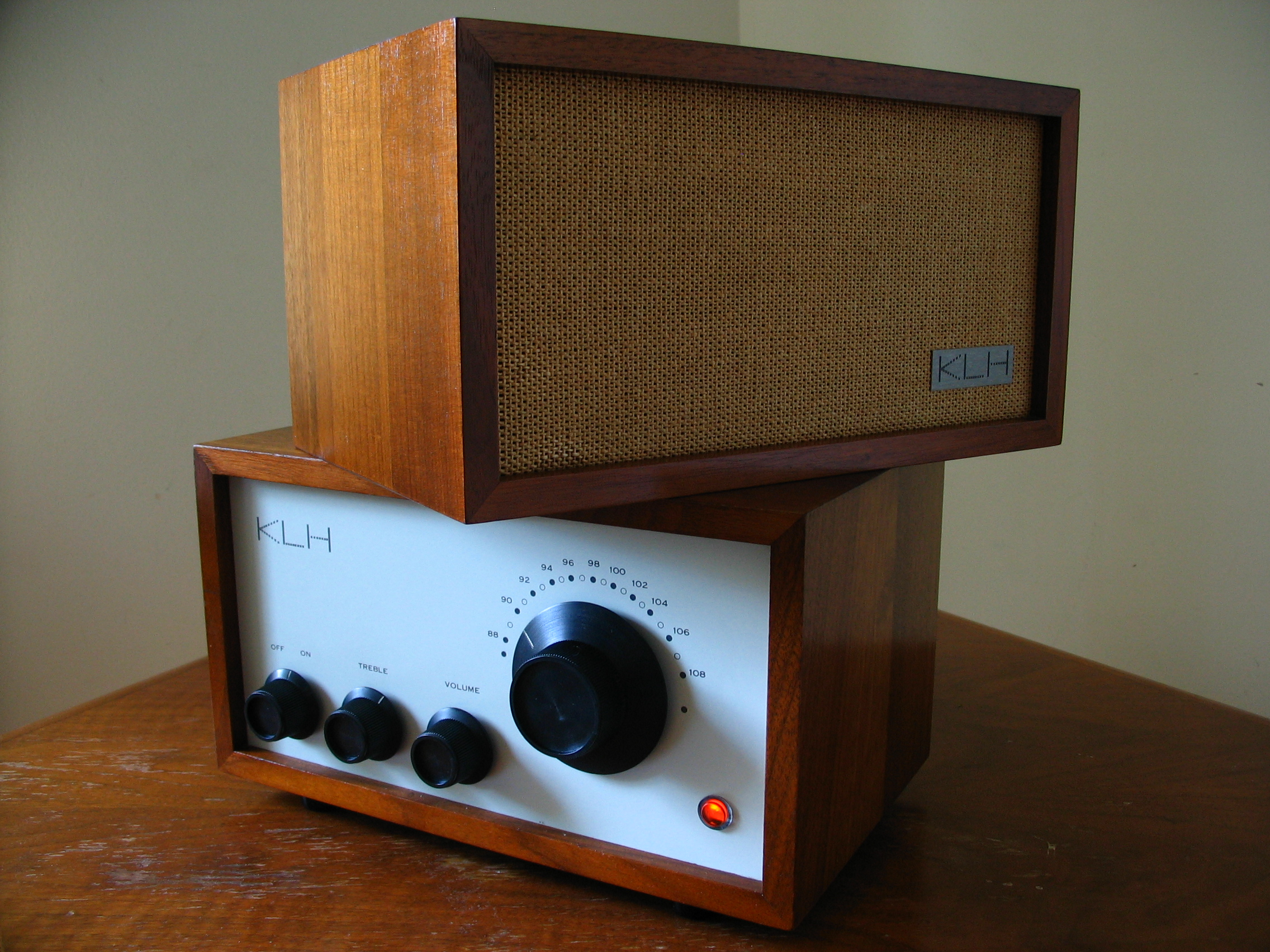
Model Eight Radio

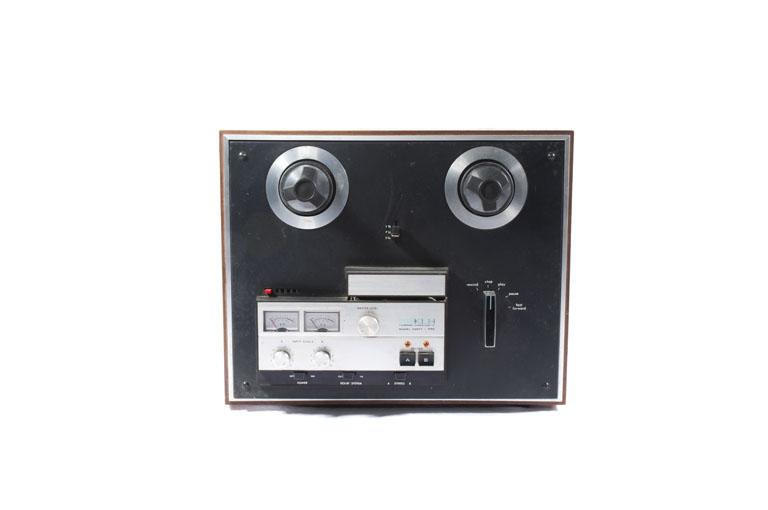
Model 41 Reel-to-Reel Tape Deck

KLH Audio is an American audio electronics company based in Denver, Colorado. Originally founded in 1957 as KLH Research and Development Corporation in Cambridge, Massachusetts, the company takes its name from the initials of its founders: Henry Kloss, Malcolm S. Low, and Josef Anton Hofmann.

== History ==
The original aim of the company was to design and produce loudspeakers in speaker enclosures. KLH had sales of $17 million, employed over 500 people and sold over 30,000 speakers a year before it was sold to Singer Corporation in 1964. In 1970, KLH became a wholly owned subsidiary of Electro Audio Dynamics (EAD) of Great Neck, New York. EAD moved KLH's headquarters to Canoga Park, Los Angeles, in 1980.

Japanese conglomerate Kyocera acquired KLH in 1982, and production was shifted overseas. Kyocera later decided to stop manufacturing audio products, and sought a buyer for the KLH brand. In 1989, KLH was acquired by Wald Sound of Sun Valley, Los Angeles.

In 2003, Sony filed a lawsuit against KLH (then Lavcon, Inc., trading as KLH Audio Systems) asserting copyright infringement of a Sony home theater system.

In January 2017, Kelley Global Brands bought the company and renamed it KLH Audio. The company makes premium high-end speakers.

In April 2025, Victrola, America's longest-living record player brand and a pioneer in consumer audio, announced the acquisition of KLH Audio.
