= Trade Register =

Trade register may refer to:

- Finnish Trade Register
- German Trade Register

== See also ==
- List of company registers
- Companies Registration Office (Ireland)
- Companies House, England and Wales
- Companies and Intellectual Property Commission (CIPC), South Africa
