= Henry Kloss =

American audio engineer and entrepreneur

- Born: February 21, 1929; Altoona, Pennsylvania, United States
- Died: January 31, 2002 (aged 72); Cambridge, Massachusetts, United States
- Occupations: Inventor; Audio Engineer; Entrepreneur

Henry Kloss (February 21, 1929 – January 31, 2002) was a prominent American audio engineer and entrepreneur who helped advance high fidelity loudspeaker and radio receiver technology beginning in the 1950s. Kloss (pronounced with a long o, like "close") was an undergraduate student in physics at the Massachusetts Institute of Technology (class of 1953), but never received a degree. He was responsible for a number of innovations, including, in part, the acoustic suspension loudspeaker and the high fidelity cassette deck. In 2000, Kloss was one of the first inductees into the Consumer Electronics Association's Hall of Fame. He earned an Emmy Award for his development of a projection television system, the Advent VideoBeam 1000.

== Career ==
During the course of his half-century career, Kloss founded or co-founded several significant audio and video equipment manufacturing companies, most of which were located in Cambridge, Massachusetts, at least during the period he was directly associated with them.

After entering MIT as a student in 1948, Kloss bought woodworking tools which he used to make enclosures in his Cambridge loft for a loudspeaker cabinet designed by an MIT professor and his grad student, the Baruch-Lang speaker. This corner speaker had four 5" drivers ("and 15 holes"), and sold for $25 (or $30 for the Deluxe Model "with a handsome frame and grill cloth").. Henry dropped out of MIT after being drafted. He was assigned to work in New Jersey, and took a night course in high fidelity taught by Edgar Villchur at New York University.

Kloss was an early adopter of new technology, including the transistor, Dolby noise reduction, and chromium dioxide magnetic recording tape.

=== Acoustic Research ===
Kloss co-founded Acoustic Research, Inc. (AR) with Edgar Villchur in the summer of 1954. Villchur, a former teacher of Kloss, had designed what he called the "acoustic suspension" loudspeaker, an elegant solution to the problem of bass harmonic distortion. Villchur had written and was awarded a patent for the acoustic-suspension loudspeaker system [US Patent No. 2,775,309, December 15, 1956], and had built a prototype of the design at his home in Woodstock, New York. Villchur had tried to sell the patent to both Altec Lansing and Bozak, manufacturers of large speakers at the time, but neither company was interested. Altec told Villchur, "if something like what you describe was possible, our engineers would have already discovered it".

After class one afternoon in the spring of 1954, Villchur and Kloss rode from New York City to Woodstock in Villchur's 1938 Buick, to allow Kloss to hear the prototype. After this, they jointly decided to manufacture the new speaker design which became known as the "AR-1", the first commercial acoustic-suspension loudspeaker system. Villchur was 100% responsible for the design and patent of the system; Kloss was responsible for perhaps 75% of the mechanical design of the speaker cabinet and system.

=== KLH (KLH Research and Development Corporation) ===
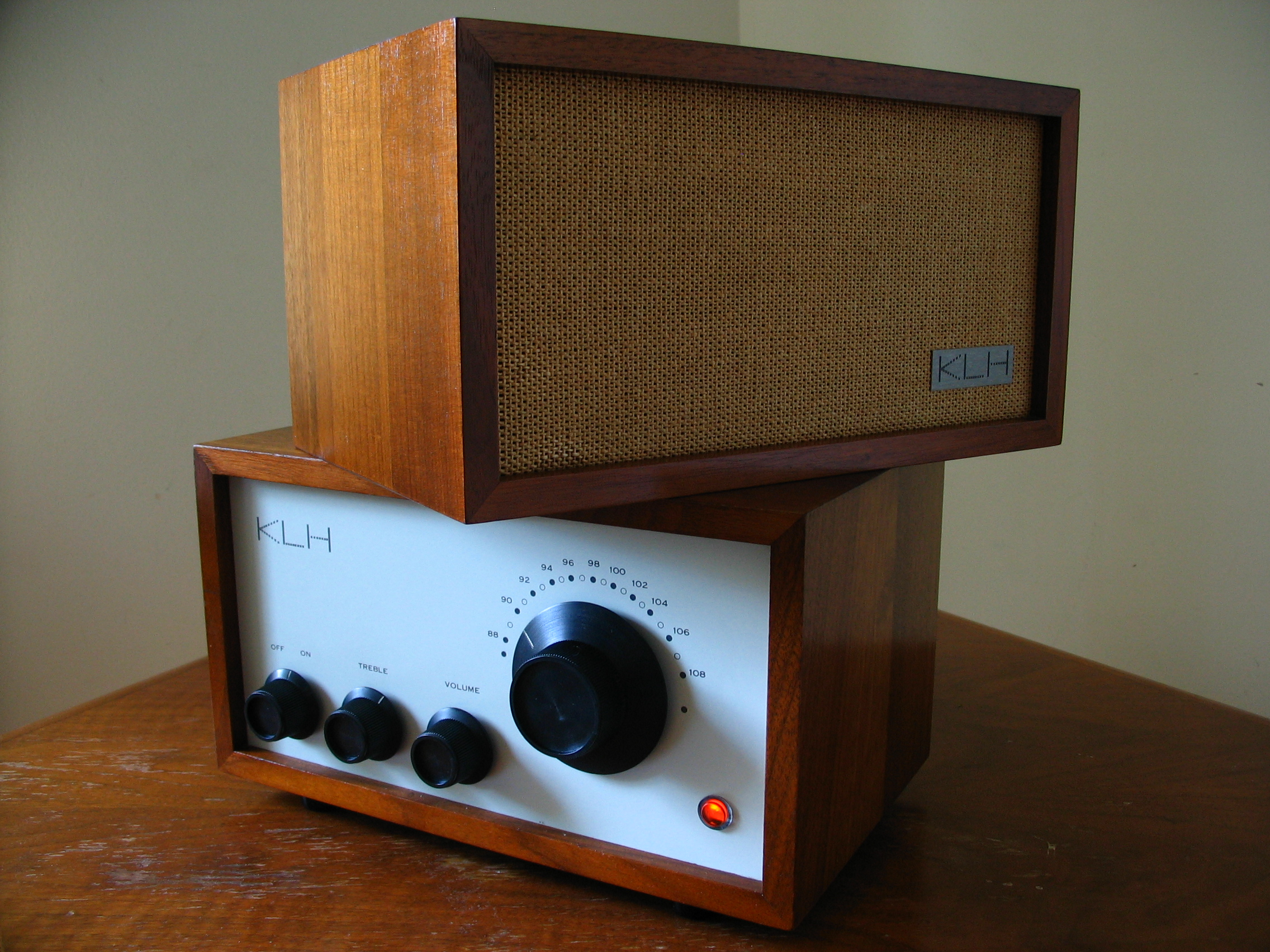
The KLH Model Eight FM table radio featured a precision planetary-geared knob for tuning, excellent sound quality, and a minimalist design.

Kloss began his custom of eponymous products by lending his last name's initial to KLH as a founder in 1957, along with Malcolm Low and J. Anton Hofmann (son of pianist Józef Hofmann), who had also been investors in AR. At Cambridge-based KLH, Kloss continued to build speakers such as the classic KLH Model Five and Six, and produced one of the first small FM radios with high selectivity, the Model Eight. The KLH Nine was the world's first full range (flat from 40 Hz - 20 kHz) electrostatic loudspeaker (1960). The tweeter was mounted near the middle, with ten woofer panels occupying the remaining area. Prototypes were completed at JansZen Laboratory and put into field tests starting in 1957, and once perfected, the speakers were put into production at KLH.

Though KLH was sold to the Singer Corporation in 1964, Kloss remained at the firm for a short time to assist in the development of additional speakers and electronic music products, and the firm continued to attract design and engineering talent. In 1967, he collaborated with Ray Dolby of Dolby Laboratories to develop the lower-cost "B" version of the Dolby noise reduction system to reduce tape hiss. This resulted in the KLH Model Forty reel-to-reel tape recorder, the first appearance of Dolby technology in the consumer product market.

By 1967, Kloss had left KLH; it was eventually sold to the Japanese firm Kyocera, and production was shifted overseas. By 1979, nearly all of the original design and engineering team had left the company.

=== Advent Corporation ===
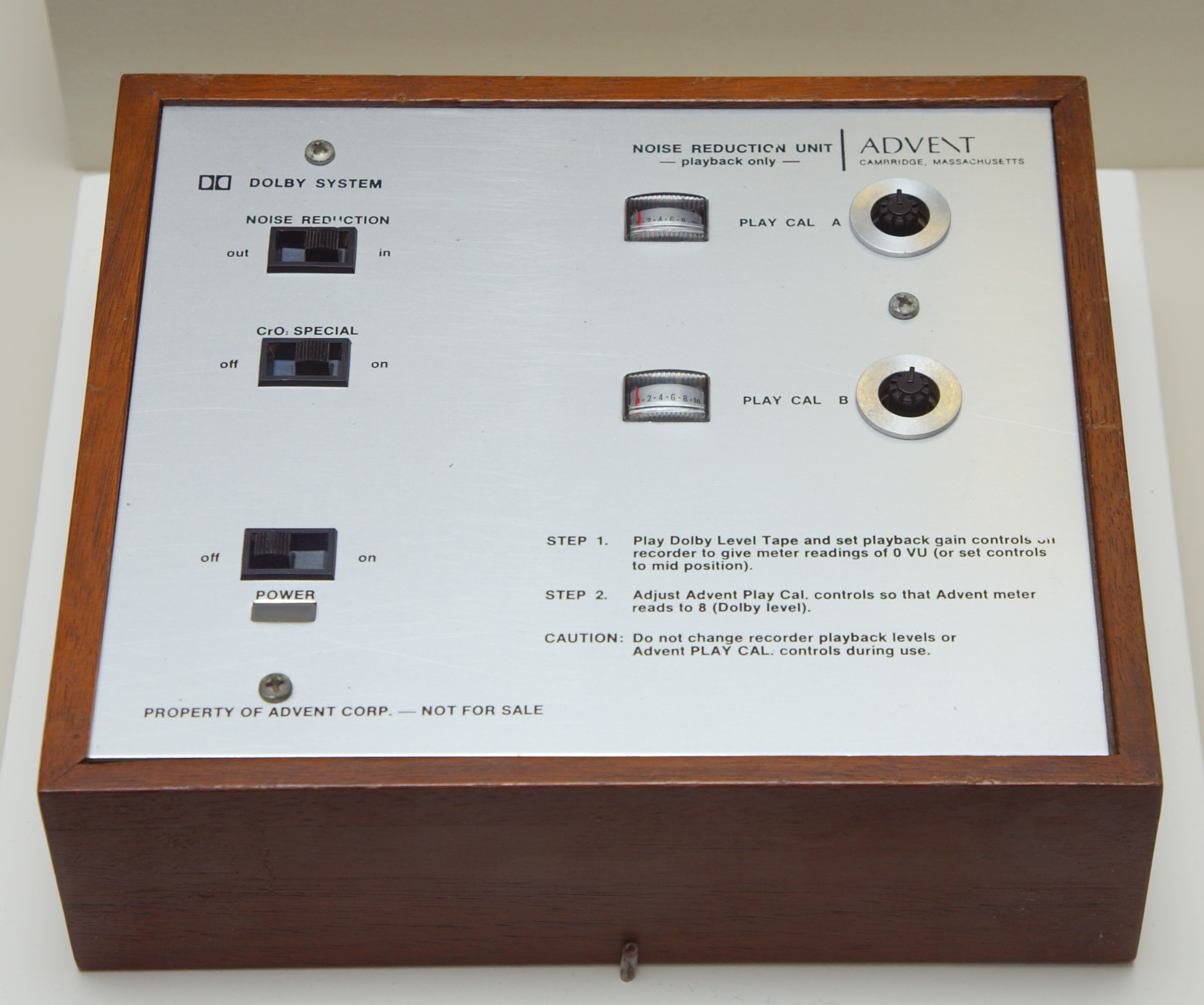
An early stand-alone Advent Dolby noise reduction unit, for tape playback use only. Later models also supported recording on tape.

Kloss founded Advent Corporation in 1967. Around 1968, Kloss had quit KLH to develop a low-cost projection television, but had trouble financing the leading-edge research and development that was still required. To earn some money, he decided to build a high-performance, low-cost, dual-driver speaker system, "The Advent Loudspeaker". A still lower-cost speaker of similar design, "The Smaller Advent Loudspeaker", was released later.

Advent designed and produced the Advent 201, the first high-fidelity cassette tape player and recorder incorporating Dolby B noise reduction. The new tape recorder had a plain, prosaic appearance that downplayed its revolutionary design and capabilities. A later incrementally-improved model, the Advent 201A, featured new Sendust tape heads which were more resistant than standard permalloy heads to abrasion from high-performance chromium dioxide coated tapes.

In 1972, the Advent VideoBeam 1000 was finally released, the first large screen projection color television for home use.

=== Kloss Video Corporation ===
In 1977, Kloss founded Kloss Video Corporation (KVC) as a spin-off company. He invented the Novatron tube there, which increased the efficiency of projection TVs. Having pioneered large-screen video projection systems, Kloss found himself undercut by lower-cost models from Japan, and he eventually shut down his company.

=== Cambridge SoundWorks ===
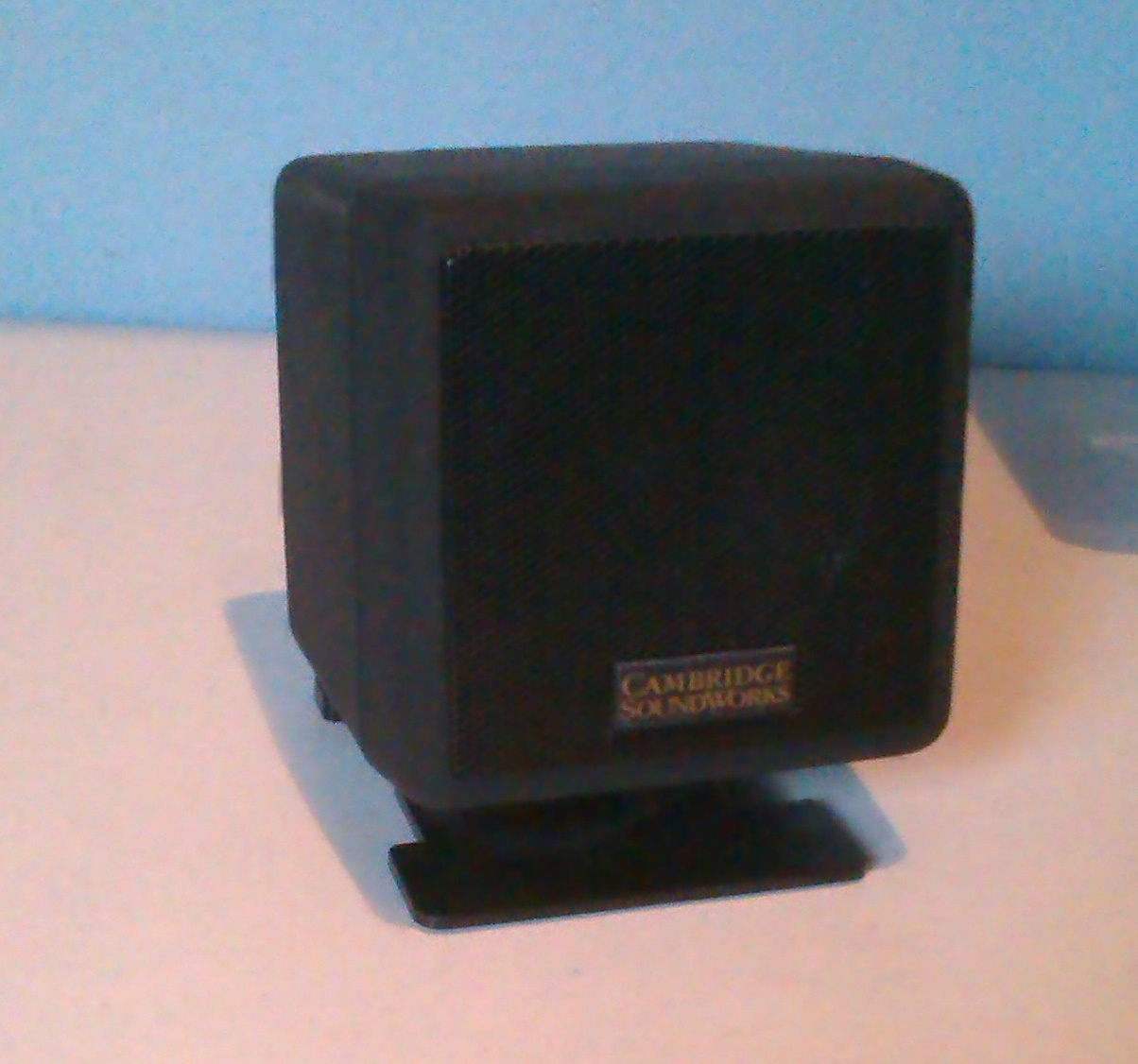
Cambridge SoundWorks - A Satellite speaker from a FPS2000 surround set

Cambridge SoundWorks was founded by Kloss and Tom DeVesto in 1988. That company was quite successful, producing dozens of different models of speakers. They also produced table radios and high quality speaker systems for computers. Kloss left Cambridge SoundWorks in 1997, and the company became a subsidiary of Creative Technology.

=== Tivoli Audio ===
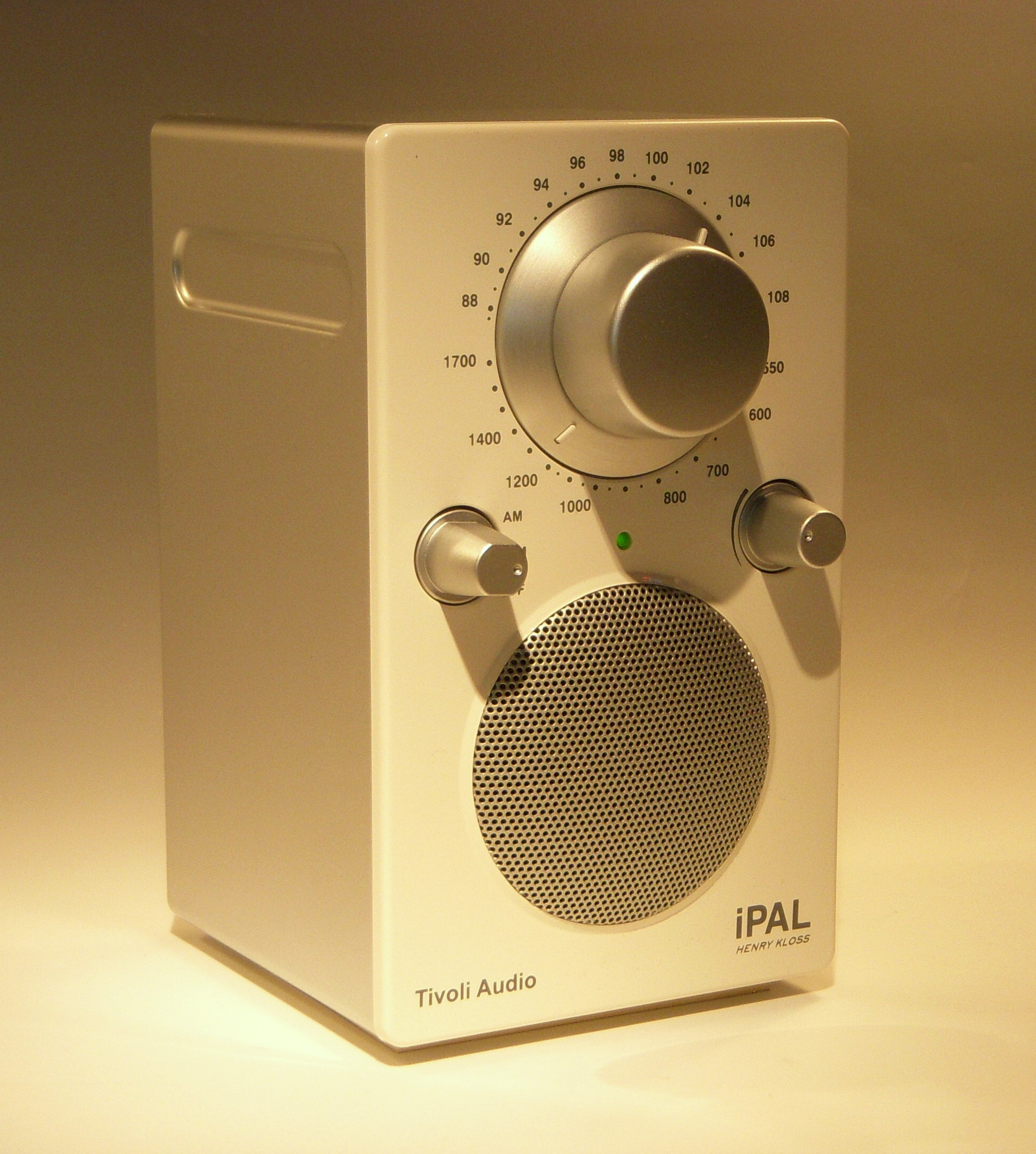
Henry Kloss design: Tivoli Audio PAL

Former Cambridge SoundWorks co-founder Tom DeVesto founded Tivoli Audio in 2000 to sell a new table radio which Kloss designed after a brief retirement. Tivoli made the Model One (mono) and Model Two (stereo) table radios using off-the shelf Integrated Circuits with MOSFET technology to increase selectivity; both radios have a classic appearance similar in appearance to Kloss' KLH Model Eight radio. The high-quality tuner combined with a good speaker arrangement led some reviewers to call these modern radios "Bose killers". However, the Cambridge SoundWorks Model 88 had used some similar technology, leading to a lawsuit between Cambridge Soundworks and Tivoli Audio.

== Design and marketing philosophy ==
Very early in his career, Kloss decided to concentrate on designing audiovisual equipment which combined high quality, often with leading-edge consumer technology, with moderate pricing. The external appearance of his products was strongly influenced by the minimalist Bauhaus esthetic style.

In his marketing and advertising, he emphasized both the high performance and the moderate cost of his products. To keep prices low, he often sold products via mail order, with generous trial period and return policies.

== Personal life ==
Kloss was sometimes seen riding an old bicycle on the streets of Cambridge, or driving an old but durable car. He usually dressed informally in well-worn clothes, and had a direct, pragmatic approach to problem-solving. Old customers would sometimes drop by his house looking for long-discontinued replacement parts, which Kloss would obligingly retrieve from the basement. His offices were cluttered with equipment and circuit boards, and he wore his gray hair pulled back out of the way in a ponytail.

He died suddenly of a subdural hematoma on January 31, 2002. He was survived by a son, two daughters, and seven grandchildren.
