= Chromium(III) oxide =

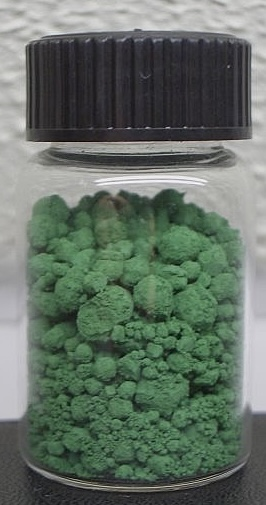

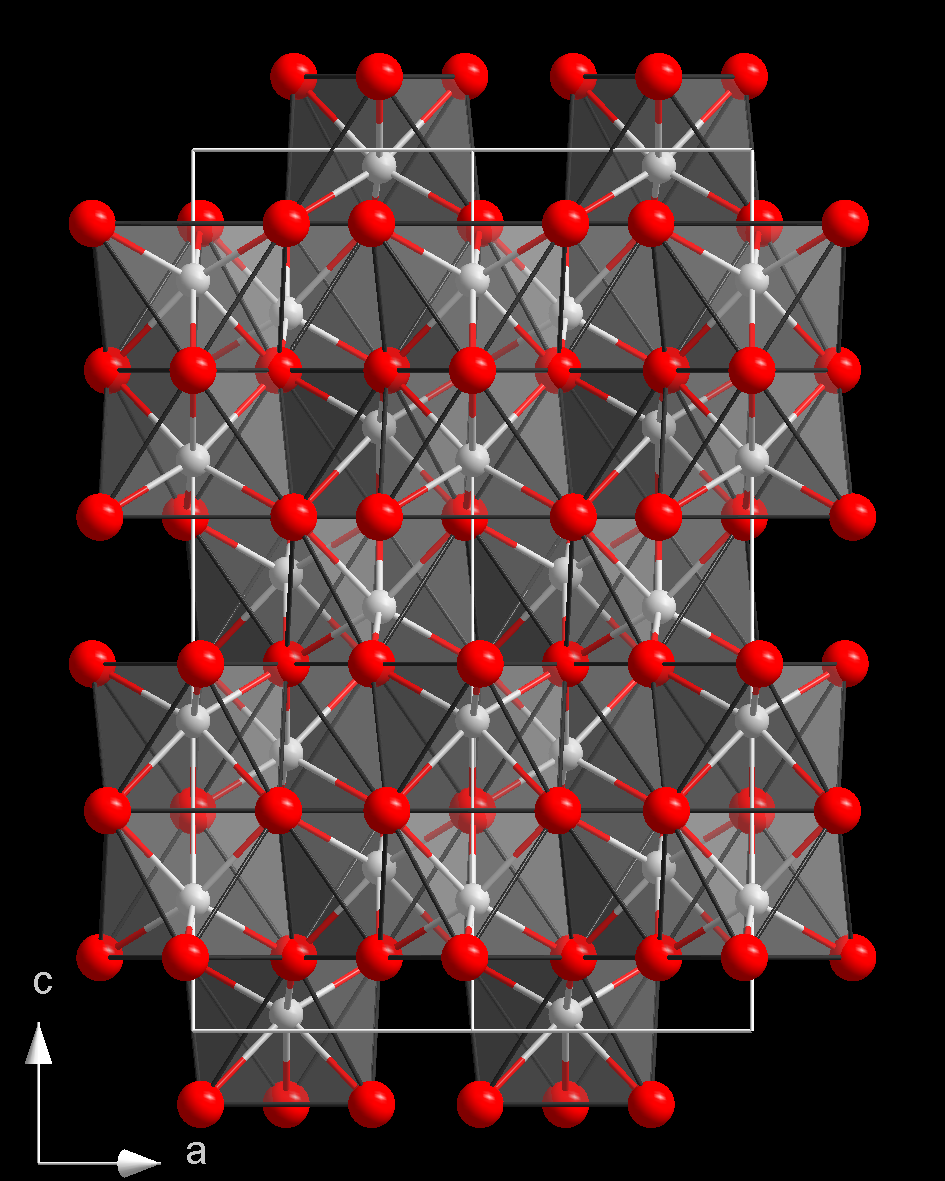

Names
- Other names Chromium sesquioxide Chromia; Chrome green Eskolaite

Identifiers
CAS Number	1308-38-9
3D model (JSmol)	Interactive image
ChEBI	CHEBI:48242
ChemSpider	451305
ECHA InfoCard	100.013.783
EC Number	215-160-9
Gmelin Reference	11116
PubChem CID	517277
RTECS number	GB6475000
UNII	X5Z09SU859
UN number	3077
CompTox Dashboard (EPA)	DTXSID4043721
- InChI: InChI=1S/2Cr.3O Key: QDOXWKRWXJOMAK-UHFFFAOYSA-N; InChI=1/2Cr.3O/rCr2O3/c3-1-5-2-4 Key: QDOXWKRWXJOMAK-LUXALHLMAR
- SMILES: O=[Cr]O[Cr]=O

Properties
Chemical formula	Cr_{2}O_{3}
Molar mass	151.9904 g/mol
Appearance	light to dark green, fine crystals
Density	5.22 g/cm^{3}
Melting point	2,435 °C (4,415 °F; 2,708 K)
Boiling point	4,000 °C (7,230 °F; 4,270 K)
Solubility in water	insoluble
Solubility in alcohol	insoluble in alcohol, acetone, acids
Magnetic susceptibility (χ)	+1960.0×10^{−6} cm^{3}/mol
Refractive index (n_{D})	2.551

Structure
Crystal structure	Corundum
Space group	R3̅c (No. 167)
Lattice constant	a = 495 pm, c = 1358 pm

Thermochemistry
Std molar entropy (S^{⦵}_{298})	81 J·mol^{−1}·K^{−1}
Std enthalpy of formation (Δ_{f}H^{⦵}_{298})	−1128 kJ·mol^{−1}

Hazards
- GHS labelling
Pictograms	(GHS07: Exclamation mark) (GHS08: Health hazard)
Signal word	Danger
Hazard statements	H302, H317, H319, H360
Precautionary statements	P201, P202, P261, P264, P270, P272, P280, P281, P301+P312, P302+P352, P305+P351+P338, P308+P313, P321, P330, P333+P313, P337+P313, P363, P405, P501
- NIOSH (US health exposure limits)
PEL (Permissible)	TWA 1 mg/m^{3}
REL (Recommended)	TWA 0.5 mg/m^{3}
IDLH (Immediate danger)	250 mg/m^{3}

Related compounds
Related compounds	Chromium(II) oxide; Chromium(IV) oxide; Chromium(VI) oxide; Chromic acid
- Except where otherwise noted, data are given for materials in their standard state (at 25 °C [77 °F], 100 kPa). verify (what is ?) Infobox references

Chromium(III) oxide (or chromia) is an inorganic compound with the formula Cr_{2}O_{3}. It is one of the principal oxides of chromium and is used as a pigment. In nature, it occurs as a rare mineral called eskolaite.

== Structure and properties ==
Cr_{2}O_{3} has the corundum structure, consisting of a hexagonal close packed array of oxide anions with two thirds of the octahedral holes occupied by chromium. Similar to corundum, Cr_{2}O_{3} is a hard, brittle material (Mohs hardness 8 to 8.5). It is antiferromagnetic up to 307 K (34 °C), the Néel temperature. It is not readily attacked by acids.

Cr_{2}O_{3} exhibits weak Tellegen response, also known as the magnetoelectric effect. Its magnetoelectric properties, predicted Igor Dzyaloshinskii in 1959, were later verified experimentally in 1960.

== Occurrence ==
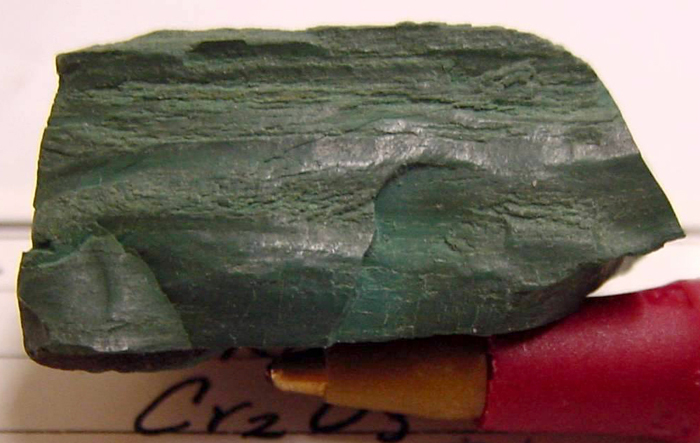
Eskolaite mineral

Cr_{2}O_{3} occurs naturally as the mineral eskolaite, which is found in chromium-rich tremolite skarns, metaquartzites, and chlorite veins. Eskolaite is also a rare component of chondrite meteorites. The mineral is named after Finnish geologist Pentti Eskola.

== Production ==
The Parisians Pannetier and Binet first prepared the transparent hydrated form of Cr_{2}O_{3} in 1838 via a secret process, sold as a pigment. It is derived from the mineral chromite, (Fe,Mg)Cr_{2}O_{4}. The conversion of chromite to chromia proceeds via Na_{2}Cr_{2}O_{7}, which is reduced with sulfur at high temperatures:

Na_{2}Cr_{2}O_{7} + S → Na_{2}SO_{4} + Cr_{2}O_{3}

The oxide is also formed by the decomposition of chromium salts such as chromium nitrate, or by the exothermic decomposition of ammonium dichromate:

(NH_{4})_{2}Cr_{2}O_{7} → Cr_{2}O_{3} + N_{2} + 4 H_{2}O

== Applications ==
Because of its considerable stability, chromia is a commonly used pigment. It was originally called viridian. It is used in paints, inks, and glasses. It is the colorant in "chrome green" and "institutional green". Chromium(III) oxide is a precursor to the magnetic pigment chromium dioxide by the following reaction:

Cr_{2}O_{3} + 3 CrO_{3} → 5 CrO_{2} + O_{2}

Along with many other oxides, it is used as a compound when polishing (also called stropping) the edges of knives, razors, surfaces of optical devices etc. on a piece of leather, balsa, cloth or other material. It is available in powder or wax form, and in this context it is known as "green compound".

It is used as a component of refractories due to its high melting point.

Once used as an inert marker in livestock intake research, its use in animal science research has been diminishing with the increased use of titanium dioxide due to the latter being considered more food-safe. Titanium dioxide as a digestion marker allows the public sale of animals used in research trials.

== Reactions ==
Chromium(III) oxide is amphoteric. Although insoluble in water, it reacts with acid to produce salts of hydrated chromium ions such as [Cr(H_{2}O)_{6}]^{3+}. It is also attacked by concentrated alkali to yield salts of [Cr(OH)_{6}]^{3−}.

When heated with finely divided carbon or aluminium, it is reduced to chromium metal:

Cr_{2}O_{3} + 2 Al → 2 Cr + Al_{2}O_{3}

Unlike the classic thermite reaction involving iron oxides, the chromium oxide thermite creates few or no sparks, smoke or sound, but glows brightly. Because of the very high melting point of chromium, chromium thermite casting is impractical.

Heating with chlorine and carbon yields chromium(III) chloride and carbon monoxide:

Cr_{2}O_{3} + 3 Cl_{2} + 3 C → 2 CrCl_{3} + 3 CO

Chromates salts form by the oxidation of chromium(III) oxide in the presence an alkali metal oxide (M_{2}O):

Cr_{2}O_{3} + 2 M_{2}O + 1.5 O_{2} → 2 M_{2}CrO_{4}

A similar oxidation proceeds with alkaline earth oxides:

Cr_{2}O_{3} + 2 MO + 1.5 O_{2} → 2 MCrO_{4}

Several million kilograms are processed in this way as a means of winning chromium from its ore. The ore is fused with a base, typically sodium carbonate, at around 1000 °C in the presence of air (source of oxygen):

2 Cr_{2}O_{3} + 4 Na_{2}CO_{3} + 3 O_{2} → 4 Na_{2}CrO_{4} + 4 CO_{2}

This step solubilizes the chromium and allows it to be extracted into hot water, separating the chromium from aluminium- and iron-containing compounds.

== See also ==
- Green pigments
- List of inorganic pigments
