= German Commercial Register =

Registration authority

A German Commercial Register (German: Handelsregister, pronounced [ˈhandl̩sʁeˌɡɪstɐ]) is a public company register that contains details of all tradespeople and legal entities in the district of the registrar, which is generally the Amtsgericht (local district court) of the place where the Landgericht (superior court) is also situated.

Each German Commercial Register contains two branches. Branch A deals with partnerships, sole traders and registered associations (Vereine) without share capital. Branch B contains all incorporated companies with share capital. Applications (for new entries, changes and liquidations) must be made in notarized form in the presence of a public notary.

== Operations ==
Amongst other things a Commercial Register contains information on:

- legal name of a company
- registered office
- people representing the company (managing director, board of directors, holders of proxy)
- subscribed capital if any.

The functions of the Commercial Register with respect to the information submitted are publication, examination, control and safekeeping. The content may be taken as accurate by any party referring to the register.

The entries to the Commercial Register are made by a judge or an authorised employee (Rechtspfleger, lit. "law caretaker"). As of 2007 all submissions to the Register have to be made electronically. Companies in the Register are given a unique Handelsregisternummer by their local district court (Amtsgericht).

Anybody may request an extract from the Commercial Register about a specific company, the so-called Ausdruck (printout), which was formerly known as Handelsregisterauszug or HR-Auszug. A simple extract is usually priced at €10.00, a notarized one about €20.00 (as of May 2016). Information about registered companies can also be downloaded online (Handelsregister online, the common register portal of the German federal states), but may require prior registration. It is possible to retrieve PDF printouts (then called Abdruck) with different level of information, e.g. AD - Aktueller Abdruck contains only the most current information whereas CD - Chronologischer Abdruck comprises current and historical data. A fee of €4.50 for each printout will be charged (as of May 2016). Simple publications (VÖ - Veröffentlichungen) are free of charge.

Until 2005 legal entities were mostly obliged to publish their Annual Reports by sending it to the Commercial Register. Starting with fiscal year 2006 this obligation has been transferred to the Bundesanzeiger, the (electronic) Federal gazette of the German government. Electronic submission is also mandatory here. Entries to the Commercial Register are also sent to the Bundesanzeiger and published by them. Newspapers sometimes also publish new entries, although since 2009, entries to newspapers are no longer mandatory.

== See also ==
- Companies Registration Office (disambiguation)
- Companies House, the comparable office for England and Wales
- Secretary of State (U.S. state), the comparable offices in states of the United States of America
- List of company registers
