= Chromium(VI) oxide peroxide =

- Chromium(VI) oxide peroxide coordination complex

Names
- IUPAC name Chromium(VI) oxide diperoxide
- Other names: Chromium oxide peroxide; Chromium pentoxide

Identifiers
CAS Number	35262-77-2 applies to "CrO_{5}", which exists only as adducts, see image
3D model (JSmol)	Interactive image
ChEBI	CHEBI:30726
ChemSpider	21865108
Gmelin Reference	101104
PubChem CID	22222816
CompTox Dashboard (EPA)	DTXSID201029514
- InChI: InChI=1/Cr.5O/q;;;-2;2*-1/rCrO4.O/c2-1(3,4)5;/q2*-2 Key: ZWPVWTIRZYDPKW-NIUFNKCUAY
- SMILES: O0O[Cr]01(=O)OO1

Properties
Chemical formula	CrO(O_{2})_{2}
Molar mass	131.991 g·mol^{−1}
Appearance	Dark blue
Solubility in water	soluble (decomposes)

Hazards
- Occupational safety and health (OHS/OSH)
Main hazards	May suddenly explode if unstabilized/dry, toxic and create highly carcinogenic chromium fumes.
- Except where otherwise noted, data are given for materials in their standard state (at 25 °C [77 °F], 100 kPa). verify (what is ?) Infobox references

Chromium(VI) oxide peroxide is a chemical compound with the chemical formula CrO(O_{2})_{2}. The name "chromium(VI) oxide peroxide" is also given to a collection of chromium coordination complexes. They have the formula CrO(O_{2})_{2}L where L is a ligand. These species are dark blue and often labile. They all feature one oxo ligand and two peroxo ligands, with the remaining coordination sites occupied by water, hydroxide, diethyl ether, pyridine, or other Lewis bases.

== Preparation and properties ==
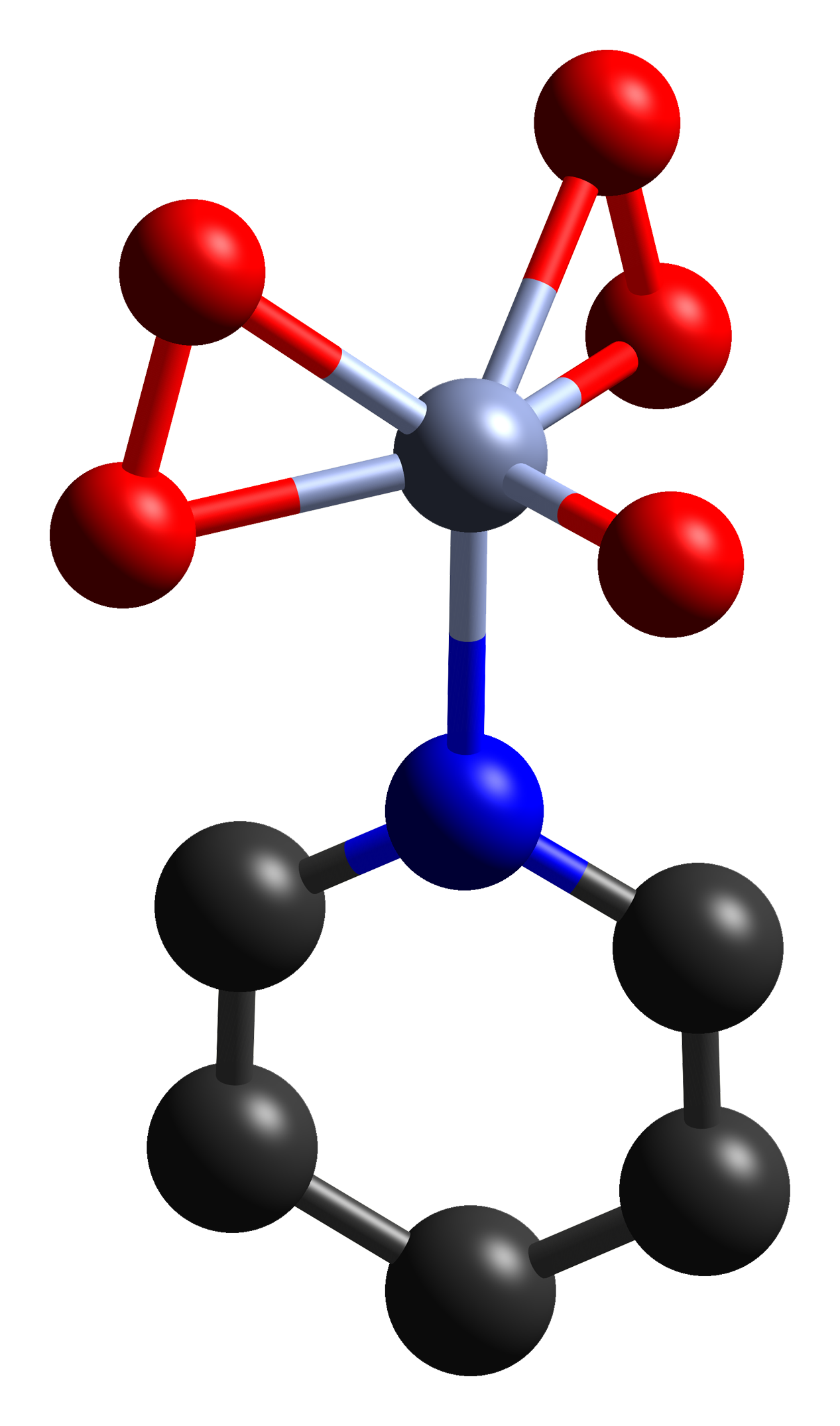
Structure of CrO(O_{2})_{2}(pyridine). Hydrogen atoms bonded to carbon atoms are omitted. Color code: Cr = gray, C= black, H = white, O= red, N = blue.

"Butterfly structure"

Chromium(VI) oxide peroxide is formed by the addition of acidified hydrogen peroxide solutions to solutions of metal chromates or dichromates, such as sodium chromate or potassium dichromate. The generally yellow chromates or orange dichromates turn to dark blue as "chromium(VI) oxide peroxide" forms:

CrO^{2−}_{4} + 2 H_{2}O_{2} + H^{+} → [CrO(O_{2})_{2}OH]^{−} + 3 H_{2}O

The structure of the pyridine complex has been determined crystallographically. Adducts with other N-heterocycles have also been characterized similarly.

Aqueous chromium(VI) oxide peroxide decomposes in a few seconds, turning green as chromium(III) compounds are formed.

2 CrO(O_{2})_{2} + 7 H_{2}O_{2} + 6 H^{+} → 2 Cr^{3+} + 10 H_{2}O + 7 O_{2}

Stable adducts of the type CrO(O_{2})_{2}L include those with L = diethyl ether, 1-butanol, ethyl acetate, or amyl acetate. They form by adding a layer of the organic solvent above the chromate/dichromate solution and shaking during the addition of hydrogen peroxide.

The etherate, bis(pyridine) and pyridine complexes of this compound have been found to be effective oxidants in organic chemistry.

CrO(O_{2})_{2} is sometimes said to have a "butterfly-like" structure due to its arrangement according to valence bond theory.

== Gallery ==
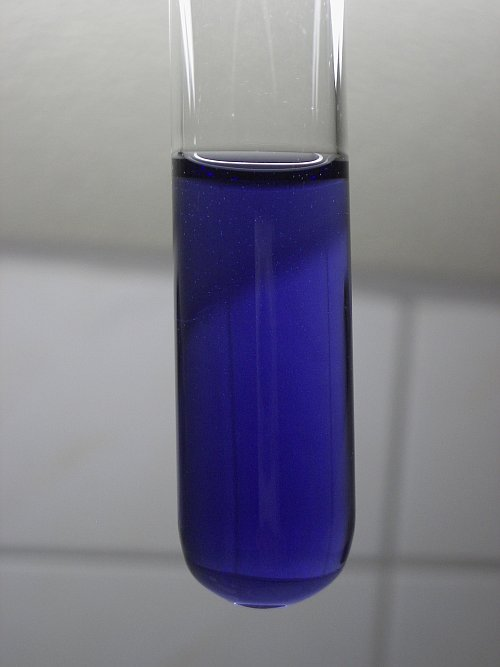
An aqueous solution of "chromium peroxide"

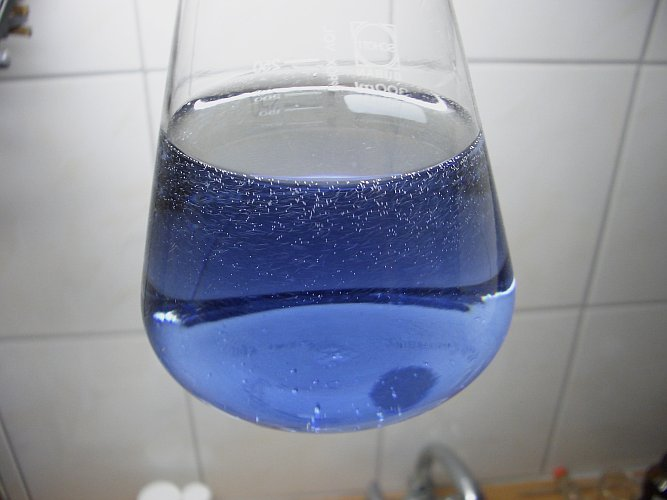
A dilute solution of "chromium peroxide"

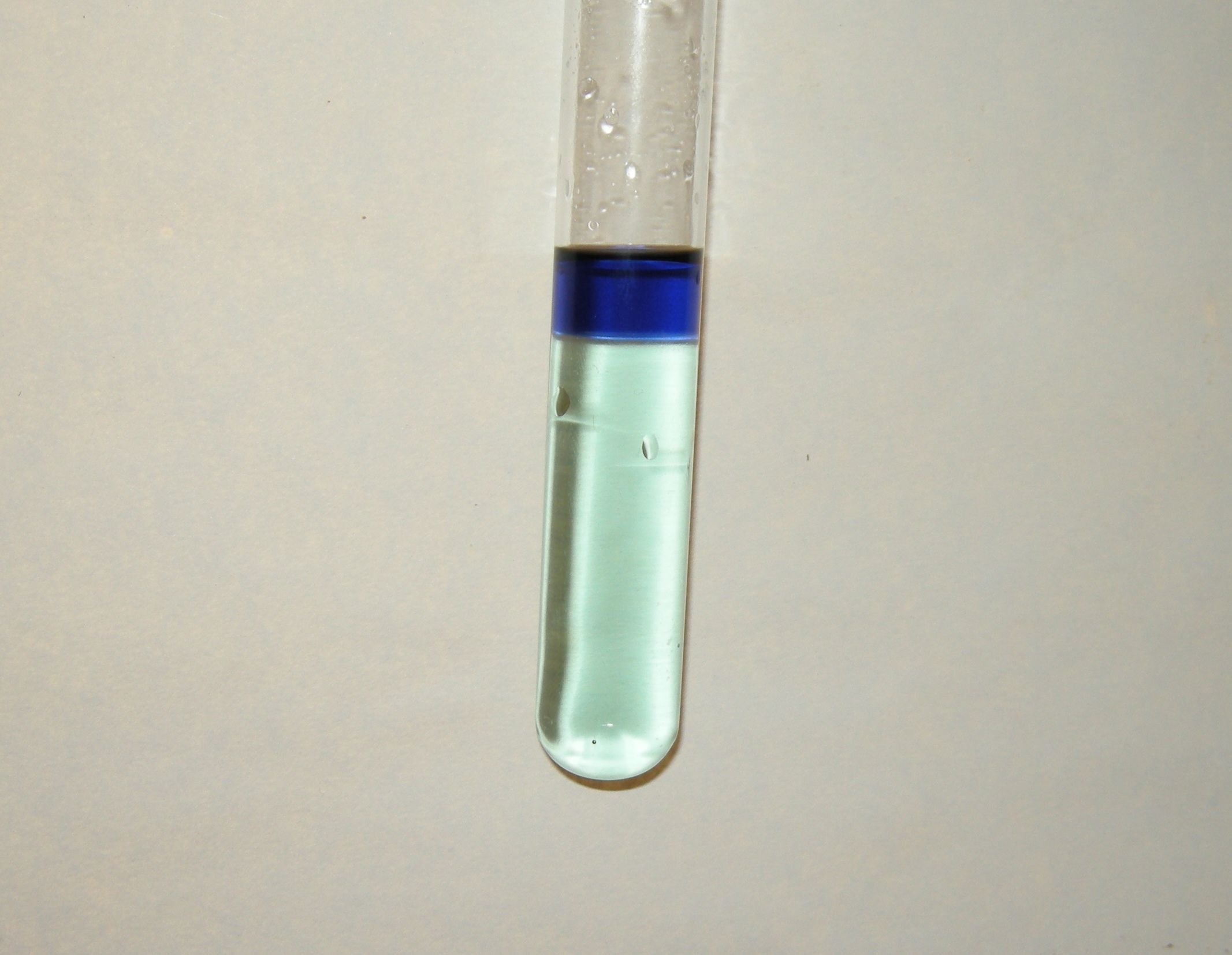
"chromium(VI) oxide peroxide" in ether phase (above) and chromium(III) aqueous solution (below).

== See also ==
- Tetraperoxochromate - a similarly synthesized analogous chromium(V) peroxide complex
- MoOPH - a molybdenum(VI) oxide peroxide complex
