= Companies Registration Office =

Companies Registration Office can be:

- Companies Registration Office (Ireland)
- Swedish Companies Registration Office
- Companies House - England and Wales
- Companies and Intellectual Property Commission (CIPC), South Africa
- Trade Register (disambiguation) in the Netherlands, Switzerland, Germany, and Finland
