= Chief reputation officer =

Executive position at an organization

A chief reputation officer (CRO) is an executive-level position at a corporation, company, organization, or institution, typically reporting directly to the CEO or board of directors and belonging to the executive board of directors.

The chief reputation officer is responsible for reputation, brand, public relations/public affairs, and the integrated management and effective and efficient coherence and consistency of all internal and external communications, throughout all physical and virtual touch-points, in order to create a favorable base for strong and lasting relationships with the stakeholders on which the organization depends.

The CRO is the corporate officer primarily responsible for:

1. Developing and implementing an integrated communication policy actively embedded in the organization’s global business strategy.
2. Helping the organization in deeply understanding its market, and stakeholders and providing knowledge and management tools on how to translate this understanding into differentiating, attractive perceptions and supportive behaviors.
3. Assisting the organization in building and maintaining strong relationships with key stakeholders among all strata of society.
4. Supporting the organization in creating global strategic alignment through company’s vision, mission, brand values and positioning, as the starting points for internal and external alignment with de organization.
5. Helping the organization in creating a strong corporate brand.
6. Assessing the organization in creating and enhancing a sustainable reputation
7. Supporting the organization in the identification and mitigation of reputational risks and to advise and participate in decisions that may impact its
8. Preparing top executives and management throughout the business for intense persuasive communication with relevant
9. Advising and supporting the top executive / CEO in building and maintaining his/her personal
10. Developing an integrated management dashboard to measure the corporate communications, brand, reputation and intangibles performance and to reveal accountability and value creation towards business and financial return.
11. Fostering the organization in its permanent transformation using reputation management to achieve corporate excellence.
