= Chromium(IV) oxide =

Chemical compound

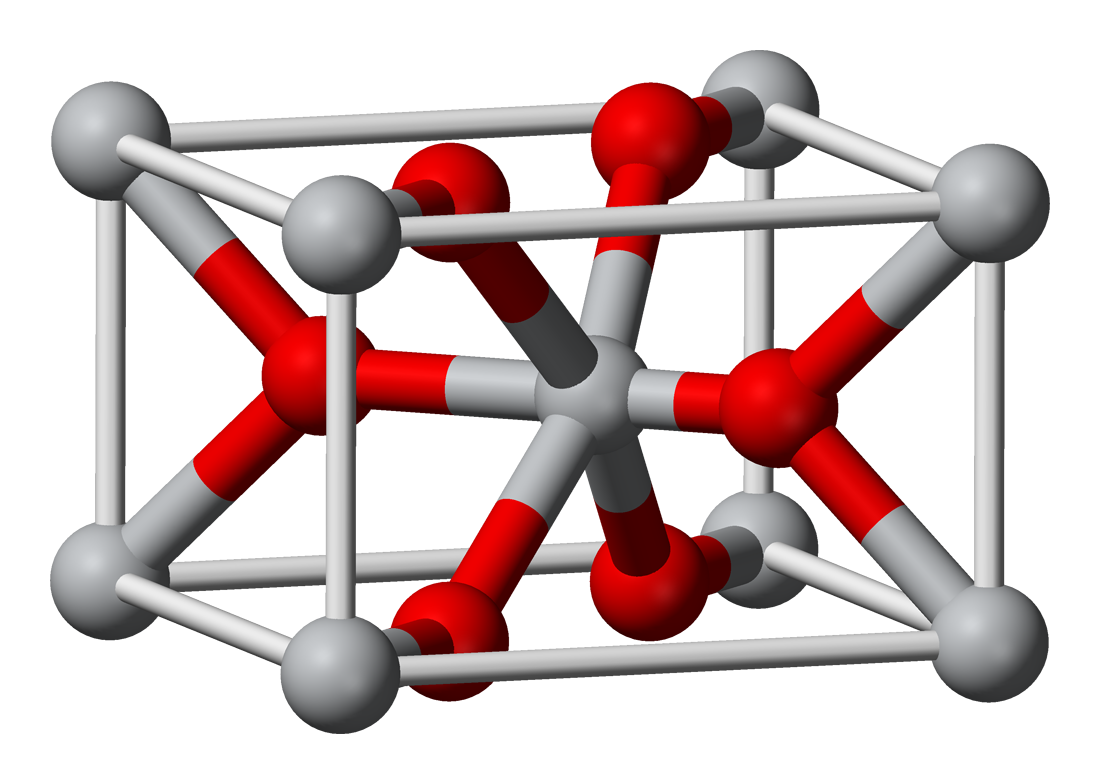
- Chromium(IV) oxide

Names
- IUPAC name Chromium(IV) oxide, Chromium dioxide
- Other names: Crolyn; magtrieve

Identifiers
CAS Number	12018-01-8
3D model (JSmol)	Interactive image
ChEBI	CHEBI:48263
ChemSpider	21171202
ECHA InfoCard	100.031.470
PubChem CID	73415796
RTECS number	GB6400000
UNII	7BHJ7466GL
CompTox Dashboard (EPA)	DTXSID7065174
- InChI: InChI=1S/Cr.2O Key: AYTAKQFHWFYBMA-UHFFFAOYSA-N; InChI=1/Cr.2O/rCrO2/c2-1-3 Key: AYTAKQFHWFYBMA-QAVXBIOBAI
- SMILES: O=[Cr]=O

Properties
Chemical formula	CrO_{2}
Molar mass	83.9949 g/mol
Appearance	black tetrahedral ferromagnetic crystals
Density	4.89 g/cm^{3}
Melting point	375 °C (707 °F; 648 K) (decomposes)
Solubility in water	Insoluble

Structure
Crystal structure	Rutile (tetragonal), tP6
Space group	P4_{2}/mnm, No. 136

Hazards
Flash point	Non-flammable
- NIOSH (US health exposure limits)
PEL (Permissible)	TWA 1 mg/m^{3}
REL (Recommended)	TWA 0.5 mg/m^{3}
IDLH (Immediate danger)	250 mg/m^{3}
Safety data sheet (SDS)	ICSC 1310

Related compounds
Other cations	Vanadium(IV) oxide; Manganese(IV) oxide
Related	Chromium(II) oxide; Chromium(II,III) oxide; Chromium(III) oxide; Chromium trioxide
- Except where otherwise noted, data are given for materials in their standard state (at 25 °C [77 °F], 100 kPa). verify (what is ?) Infobox references

Chromium dioxide or chromium(IV) oxide is an inorganic compound with the formula CrO_{2}. It is a black, synthetic, magnetic solid. It once was widely used in magnetic tape emulsion. With the increase in popularity of CDs and DVDs and more recently digital media, the use of chromium(IV) oxide has declined. However, it is still used in data tape applications for enterprise-class storage systems. It is still considered by many oxide and tape manufacturers to have been one of the best magnetic recording particulates ever invented.

== Preparation and basic properties ==
CrO_{2} was first prepared by Friedrich Wöhler by decomposition of chromyl chloride. Acicular chromium dioxide was first synthesized in 1956 by Norman L. Cox, a chemist at E.I. DuPont, by decomposing chromium trioxide in the presence of water at a temperature of 800 K (527 °C; 980 °F) and a pressure of 200 MPa. The balanced equation for the hydrothermal synthesis is:

3 CrO_{3} + Cr_{2}O_{3} → 5 CrO_{2} + O_{2}

The magnetic crystal that forms is a long, slender glass-like rod – useful as a magnetic pigment for recording tape. When commercialized in the late 1960s as a recording medium, DuPont assigned it the trade name of Magtrieve.

CrO_{2} adopts the rutile structure (as do many metal dioxides). As such, each Cr(IV) center has octahedral coordination geometry and each oxide is trigonal planar.

== Uses ==
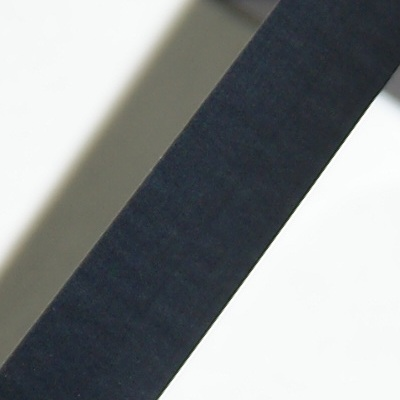
CrO_{2} cassette tape

The crystal's magnetic properties, derived from its ideal shape such as anisotropy which imparted high coercivity and remanent magnetization intensities, resulted in exceptional stability and efficiency for short wavelengths, and it almost immediately appeared in high performance audio tape used in audio cassettes for which treble response and hiss were always problems. Unlike the imperfectly formed ferric oxide coating commonly used, the chromium dioxide crystals were perfectly formed and could be evenly and densely dispersed in a magnetic coating, leading to higher signal-to-noise ratios in audio recordings. Chrome tapes did, however, require audio cassette recorders to be equipped with a higher-bias current capability (roughly 50% greater) than that used by ferric oxide to properly magnetize the tape particles. Also introduced was a new equalization (70 μs) that traded some of the extended high-frequency response for lower noise, resulting in a 5–6 dB improvement in signal-to-noise ratio over ferric oxide audio tapes. These bias and EQ settings were later carried over to "chrome-equivalent" cobalt-modified tapes introduced in the mid-1970s by TDK, Maxell, and others. Later research significantly increased the coercivity of the particle by doping or adsorbing rare elements such as iridium onto the crystal matrix or by improving the axial length-to-deprecated ratios. The resulting product was potentially a competitor to metallic iron pigments but apparently achieved little market penetration.

=== Problems ===
Until manufacturers developed new ways to mill the oxide, the crystals could easily be broken in the manufacturing process, and this led to excessive print-through (echo). Output from a tape could drop about 1 dB or so in a year's time. Although the decrease was uniform across the frequency range and noise also dropped the same amount, preserving the dynamic range, the decrease misaligned Dolby noise reduction decoders that were sensitive to level settings. The chrome coating was harder than competitive coatings, and that led to accusations of excessive head wear. Although the tape initially wore hard ferrite heads faster than oxide-based tapes, it actually wore softer permalloy heads at a slower rate; and head wear was more a problem for permalloy heads than for ferrite heads. However, after 500 hours of running across ferrite heads, chrome tape had polished the granular ferrite surface enough that there was no more detectable wear; and, unlike the wear from ferric and ferric-cobalt tapes, the edges of the head gaps remained sharp and distinct. The head wear scare and licensing issues with DuPont kept blank consumer chrome tapes at a great disadvantage versus the eventually more popular Type II tapes that used cobalt-modified iron oxide, but chrome was the tape of choice for the music industry's cassette releases. Because of its low Curie temperature of approximately 386 K (113 °C; 235 °F), chrome tape lent itself to high-speed thermomagnetic duplication of audio and video cassettes for pre-recorded product sales to the consumer and industrial markets.

== Producers ==
DuPont licensed the product to Sony in Japan and BASF in Germany in the early 1970s for regional production and distribution. Japanese competitors developed cobalt-adsorbed (TDK: Avilyn) and cobalt ferrite (Maxell: Epitaxial) "chrome equivalent" Type II audio cassettes and various videotape formats as substitutes. Added to that was the problem that the production of CrO_{2} yielded toxic by-products of which Japanese manufacturers had great difficulty properly disposing. BASF eventually became the largest producer of both the chromium dioxide pigments and chrome tapes, basing its VHS & S-VHS video tape, audio cassettes, and 3480 data cartridges on different versions of this magnetic pigment. DuPont and BASF had also introduced chrome-cobalt "blended" oxide pigments which combined about 15% cobalt-modified iron oxide with 85% chrome oxide into a single coating in order to improve maximum output levels at longer wavelengths. Many high-grade VHS tapes also used much smaller amounts of chrome in their formulations because its magnetic properties combined with its cleaning effects on heads made it a better choice than aluminium oxide or other non-magnetic materials added to VHS tape to keep heads clean. DuPont discontinued its production of chromium dioxide particles in the 1990s. In addition to BASF, which no longer owns a tape manufacturing division, Bayer AG of Germany, as well as Toda Kogyo and Sakai Chemical of Japan, can also produce the magnetic particles for commercial applications.
