= Chromium(II) oxide =

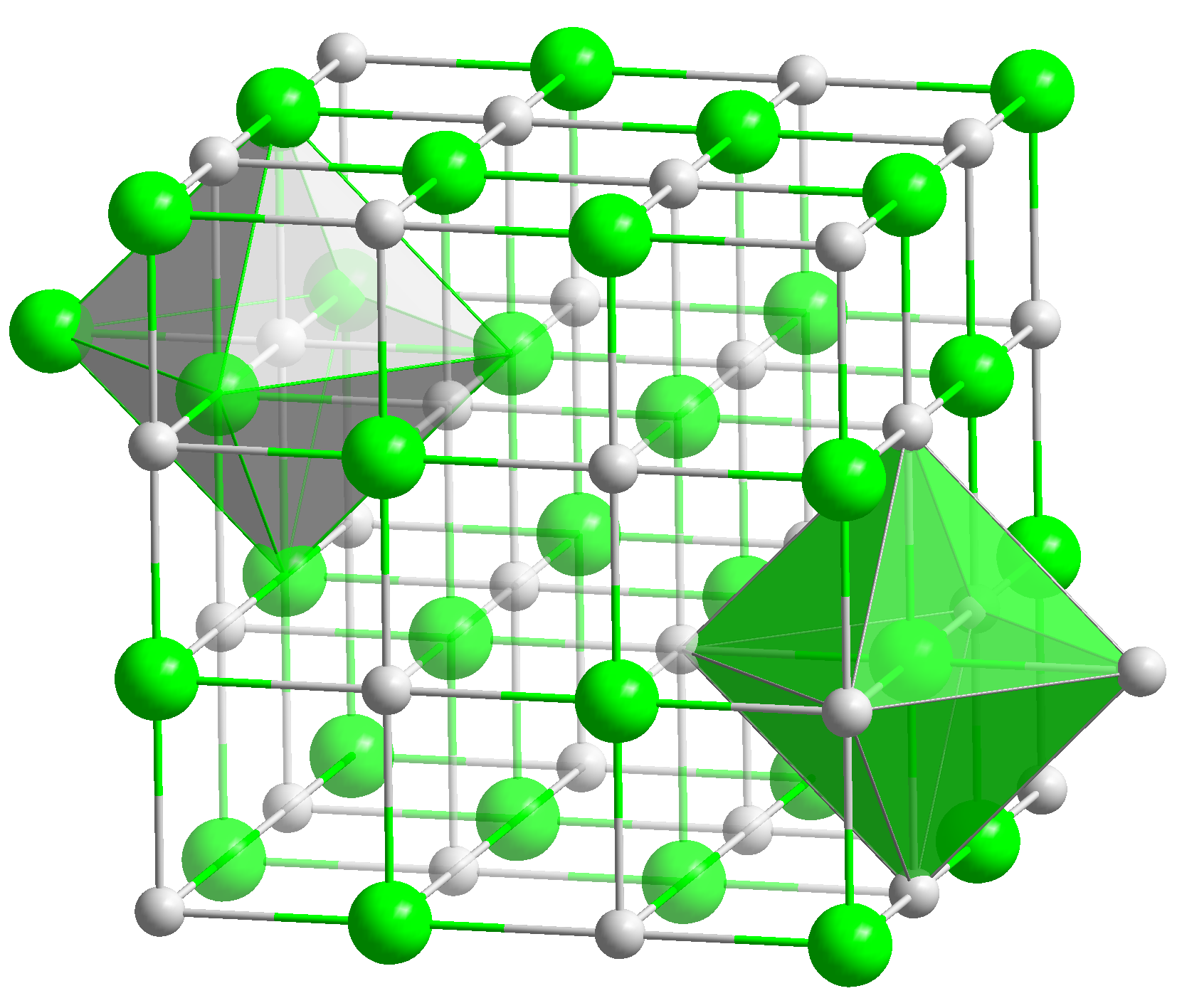

Names
- IUPAC name chromium(II) oxide

Identifiers
CAS Number	12018-00-7
3D model (JSmol)	Interactive image
ChemSpider	2300900
PubChem CID	3037052
CompTox Dashboard (EPA)	DTXSID701314334 DTXSID20152717, DTXSID701314334
- InChI: InChI=1S/Cr.O Key: XVOFZWCCFLVFRR-UHFFFAOYSA-N
- SMILES: O=[Cr]

Properties
Chemical formula	CrO
Molar mass	67.996 g/mol
Appearance	black
Melting point	300 °C (572 °F; 573 K) (decomposes)

Structure
Crystal structure	cubic, cF8
Space group	Fm3̅m, No. 225

Related compounds
Related compounds	Chromium(III) oxide; Chromium(IV) oxide; Chromium(VI) oxide
- Except where otherwise noted, data are given for materials in their standard state (at 25 °C [77 °F], 100 kPa). verify (what is ?) Infobox references

Chromium(II) oxide (CrO) is an inorganic compound composed of chromium and oxygen. It is a black powder that crystallises in the rock salt structure.

== Properties ==
It is readily oxidized by the atmosphere. CrO is basic, while CrO_{3} is acidic, and Cr_{2}O_{3} is amphoteric.

== Occurrence ==
CrO occurs in the spectra of luminous red novae, which occur when two stars collide. It is not known why red novae are the only objects that feature this molecule; one possible explanation is an as-yet-unknown nucleosynthesis process.

== Preparation ==
Hypophosphites such as hypophosphorous acid can reduce chromium(III) oxide to chromium(II) oxide:

H_{3}PO_{2} + 2 Cr_{2}O_{3} → 4 CrO + H_{3}PO_{4}
