= Chromate and dichromate =

Chromium(VI) anions

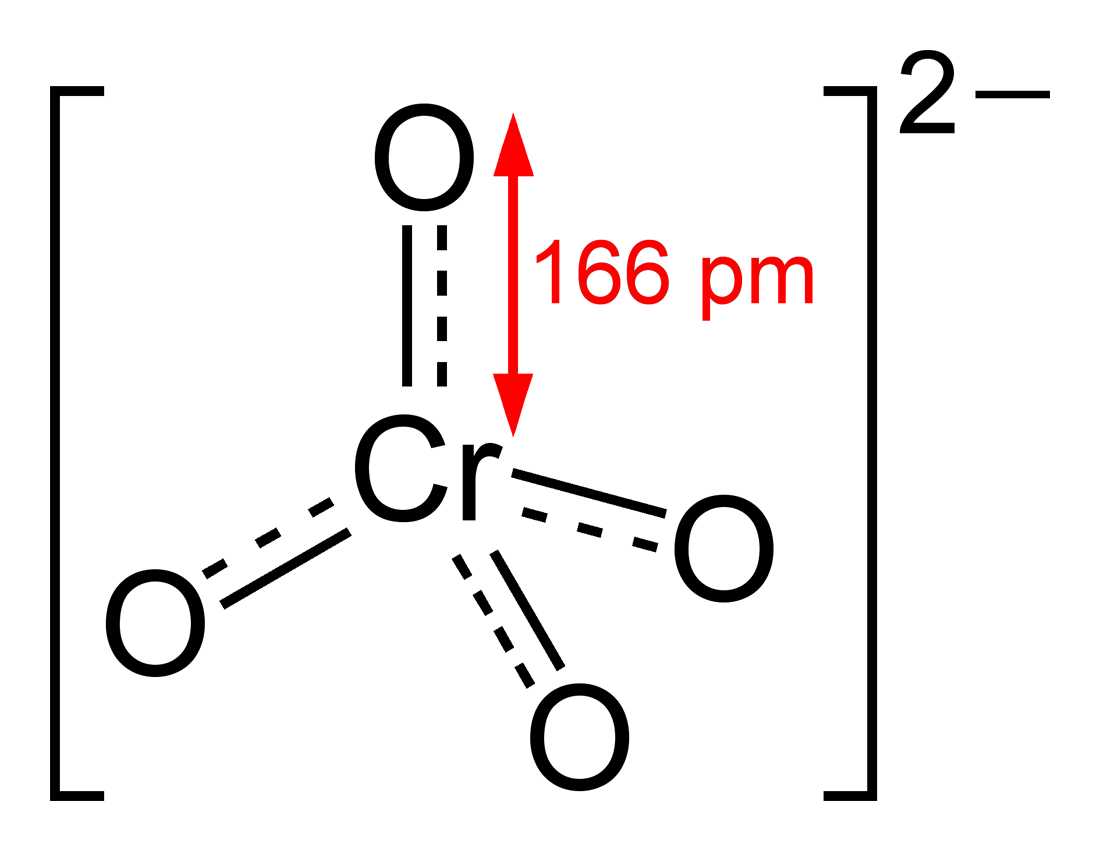

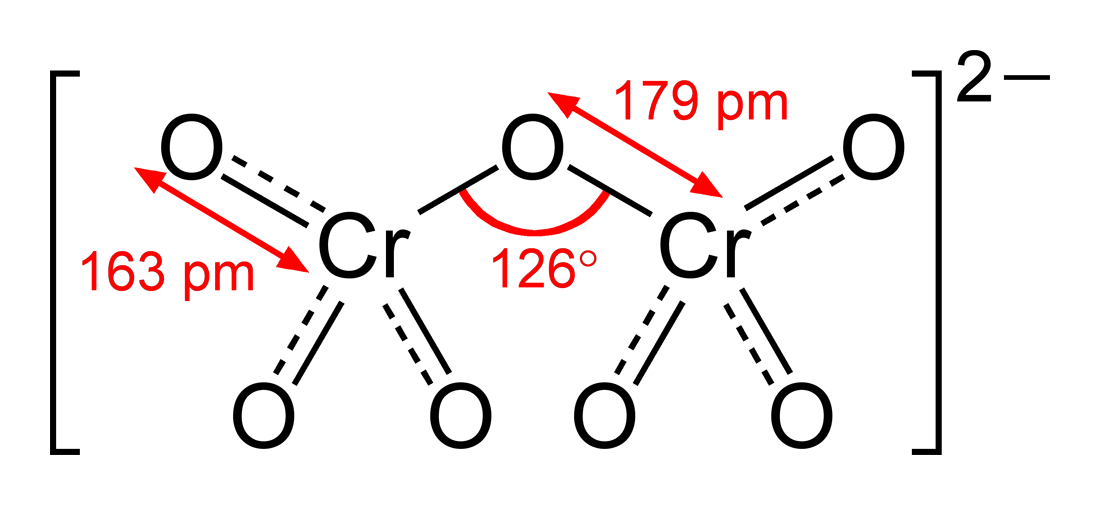

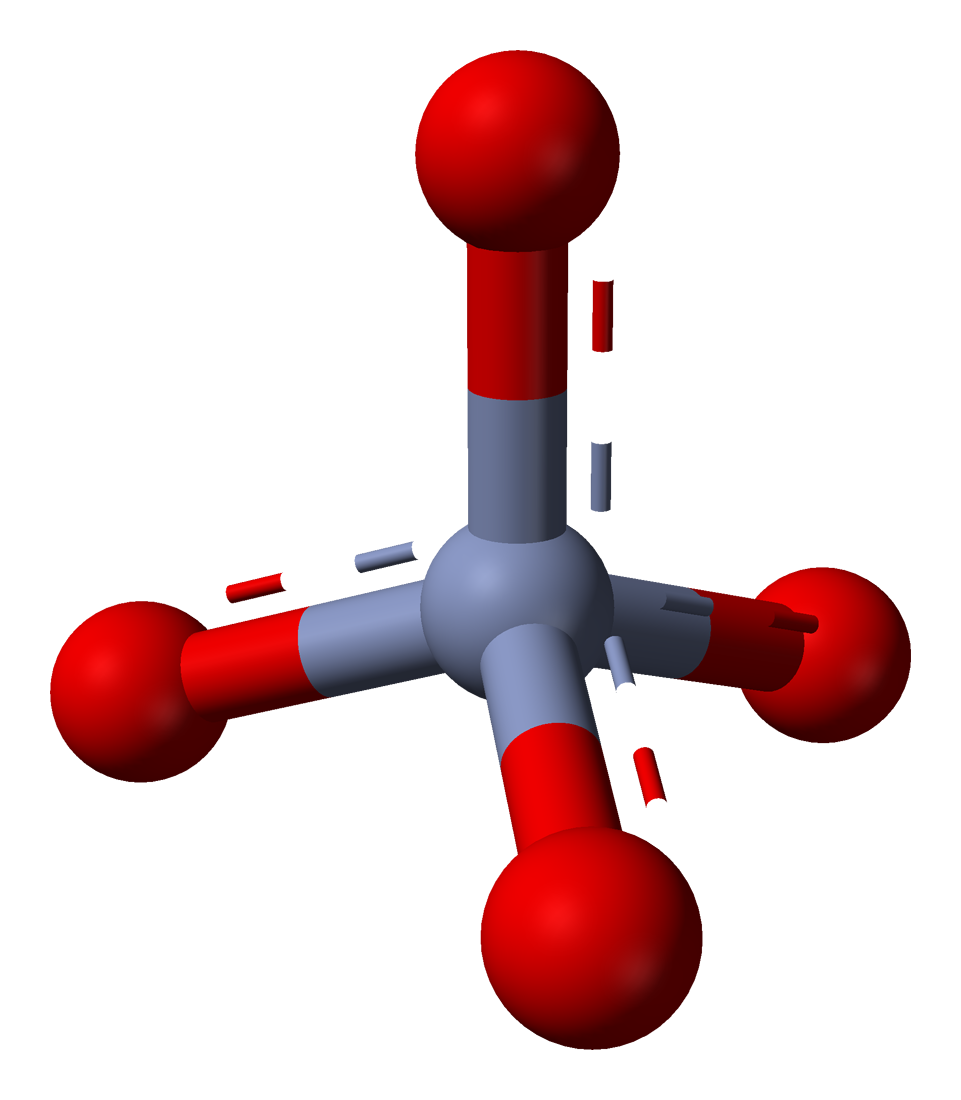

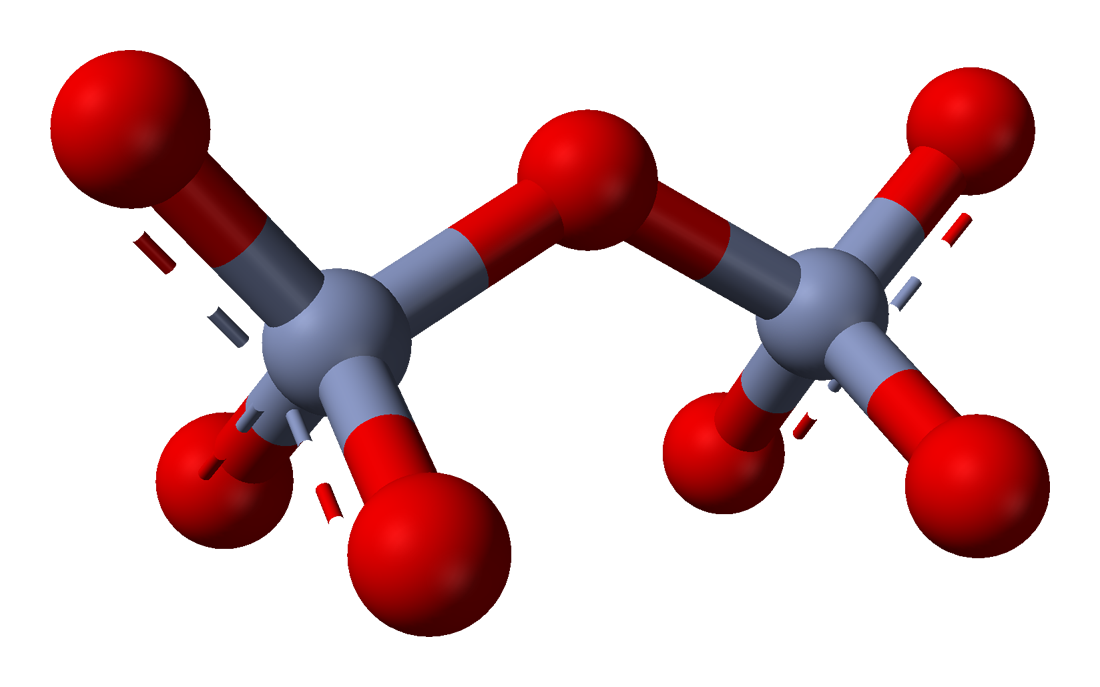

Names
- Systematic IUPAC name Chromate and dichromate

Identifiers
CAS Number	chromate: 13907-45-4; dichromate: 13907-47-6
3D model (JSmol)	chromate: Interactive image; dichromate: Interactive image
ChEBI	chromate: CHEBI:35404; dichromate: CHEBI:33141
ChemSpider	chromate: 22869; dichromate: 22911
DrugBank	dichromate: DB14182
PubChem CID	chromate: 24461; dichromate: 24503
UNII	chromate: 9S2Y101D6M; dichromate: 9LKY4BFN2V
CompTox Dashboard (EPA)	chromate: DTXSID7065675; dichromate: DTXSID5074004
- InChI: chromate: InChI=1S/Cr.4O/q;;;2*-1 Key: ZCDOYSPFYFSLEW-UHFFFAOYSA-N; dichromate: InChI=1S/2Cr.7O/q;;;;;;;2*-1 Key: SOCTUWSJJQCPFX-UHFFFAOYSA-N
- SMILES: chromate: [O-][Cr](=O)(=O)[O-]; dichromate: O=[Cr](=O)([O-])O[Cr](=O)(=O)[O-]

Properties
Chemical formula	CrO_{4}^{2−} and Cr_{2}O_{7}^{2−}
Molar mass	115.994 g mol^{−1} and 215.988 g mol^{−1}
Conjugate acid	Chromic acid
- Except where otherwise noted, data are given for materials in their standard state (at 25 °C [77 °F], 100 kPa). Infobox references

Chromate salts contain the chromate anion, CrO_{4}^{2−}. Dichromate salts contain the dichromate anion, Cr_{2}O_{7}^{2−}. They are oxyanions of chromium in the +6 (hexavalent) oxidation state and are moderately strong oxidizing agents. In an aqueous solution, chromate and dichromate ions can be interconvertible.

== Chemical properties ==
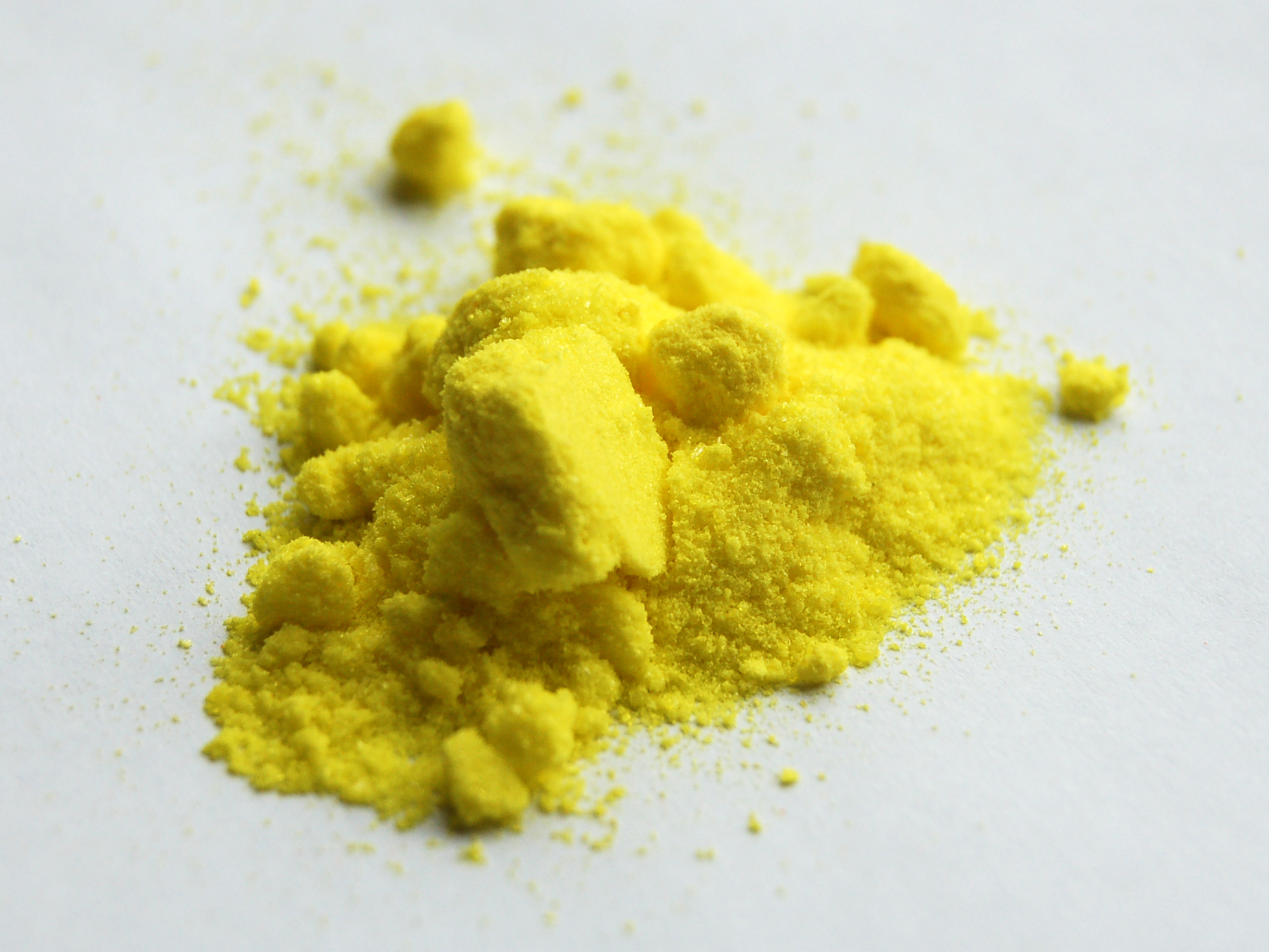
Potassium chromate

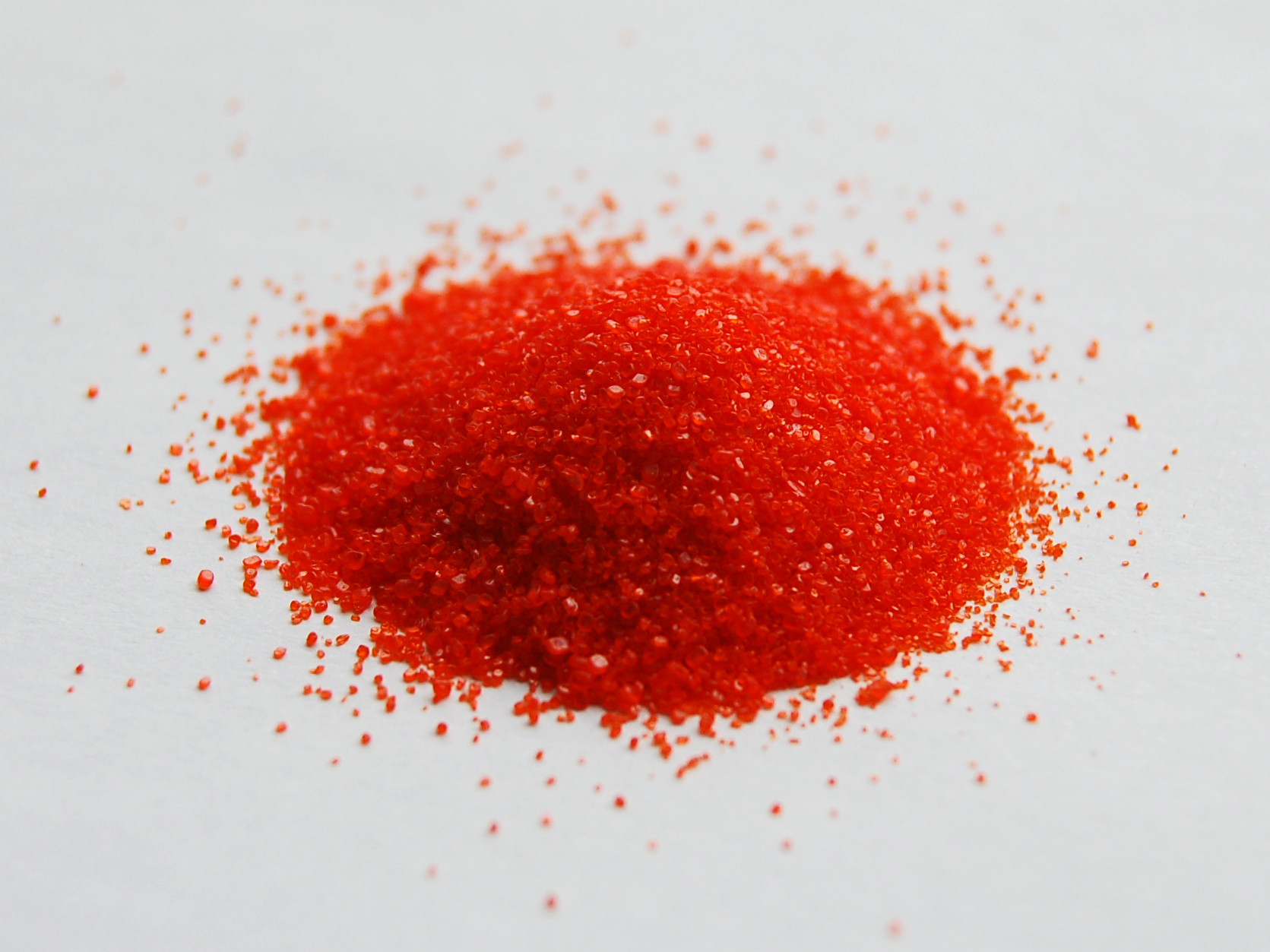
Potassium dichromate

Chromates react with hydrogen peroxide, giving products in which peroxide, O_{2}^{2−}, replaces one or more oxygen atoms. In acid solution the unstable blue peroxo complex Chromium(VI) oxide peroxide, CrO(O_{2})_{2}, is formed; it is an uncharged covalent molecule, which may be extracted into ether. Addition of pyridine results in the formation of the more stable complex CrO(O_{2})_{2}(pyridine).

=== Acid–base properties ===
In aqueous solution, chromate and dichromate anions exist in a chemical equilibrium.

2 CrO_{4}^{2−} + 2 H^{+} ⇌ Cr_{2}O_{7}^{2−} + H_{2}O

The predominance diagram shows that the position of the equilibrium depends on both pH and the analytical concentration of chromium. (Note: pCr is equal to the negative of the decimal logarithm of the molar concentration of chromium. Thus, when pCr = 2, the chromium concentration is 10^{−2} mol/L.)

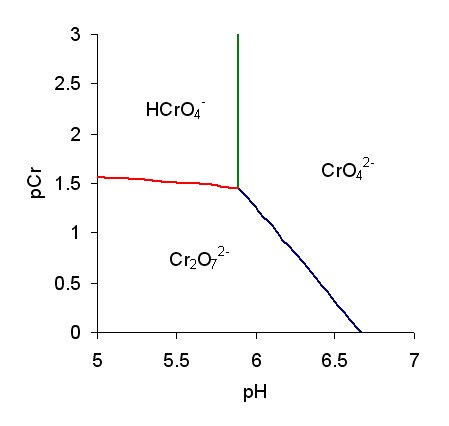
Predominance diagram for chromate

The chromate ion is the predominant species in alkaline solutions, but dichromate can become the predominant ion in acidic solutions.

Further condensation reactions can occur in strongly acidic solution with the formation of trichromates, Cr_{3}O_{10}^{2−}, and tetrachromates, Cr_{4}O_{13}^{2−}. All polyoxyanions of chromium(VI) have structures made up of tetrahedral CrO_{4} units sharing corners.

The hydrogen chromate ion, HCrO_{4}^{−}, is a weak acid:

HCrO_{4}^{−} ⇌ CrO_{4}^{2−} + H^{+}; pK_{a} ≈ 5.9

It is also in equilibrium with the dichromate ion:

2 HCrO_{4}^{−} ⇌ Cr_{2}O_{7}^{2−} + H_{2}O

This equilibrium does not involve a change in hydrogen ion concentration, which would predict that the equilibrium is independent of pH. The red line on the predominance diagram is not quite horizontal due to the simultaneous equilibrium with the chromate ion. The hydrogen chromate ion may be protonated, with the formation of molecular chromic acid, H_{2}CrO_{4}, but the pK_{a} for the equilibrium

H_{2}CrO_{4} ⇌ HCrO_{4}^{−} + H^{+}

is not well characterized. Reported values vary between about −0.8 and 1.6.

The dichromate ion is a somewhat weaker base than the chromate ion:

HCr_{2}O_{7}^{−} ⇌ Cr_{2}O_{7}^{2−} + H^{+}, pK_{a} = 1.18

The pK_{a} value for this reaction shows that it can be ignored at pH > 4.

=== Oxidation–reduction properties ===
The chromate and dichromate ions are fairly strong oxidizing agents. Commonly three electrons are added to a chromium atom, reducing it to oxidation state +3. In acid solution the aquated Cr^{3+} ion is produced.

Cr_{2}O_{7}^{2−} + 14 H^{+} + 6 e^{−} → 2 Cr^{3+} + 7 H_{2}O ε_{0} = 1.33 V

In alkaline solution chromium(III) hydroxide is produced. The redox potential shows that chromates are weaker oxidizing agent in alkaline solution than in acid solution.

CrO_{4}^{2−} + 4 H_{2}O + 3 e^{−} → Cr(OH)_{3} + 5 OH^{−} ε_{0} = −0.13 V

== Applications ==
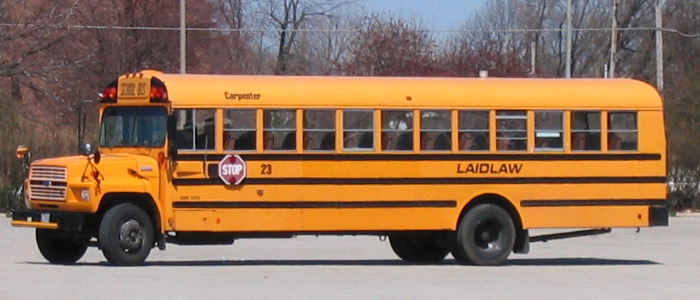
School bus painted in Chrome yellow

Approximately 136,000 tonnes (150,000 tons) of hexavalent chromium, mainly sodium dichromate, were produced in 1985. Chromates and dichromates are used in chrome plating to protect metals from corrosion and to improve paint adhesion. Chromate and dichromate salts of heavy metals, lanthanides and alkaline earth metals are only very slightly soluble in water and are thus used as pigments. The lead-containing pigment chrome yellow was used for a very long time before environmental regulations discouraged its use. When used as oxidizing agents or titrants in a redox chemical reaction, chromates and dichromates convert into trivalent chromium, Cr^{3+}, salts of which typically have a distinctively different blue-green color.

== Natural occurrence and production ==
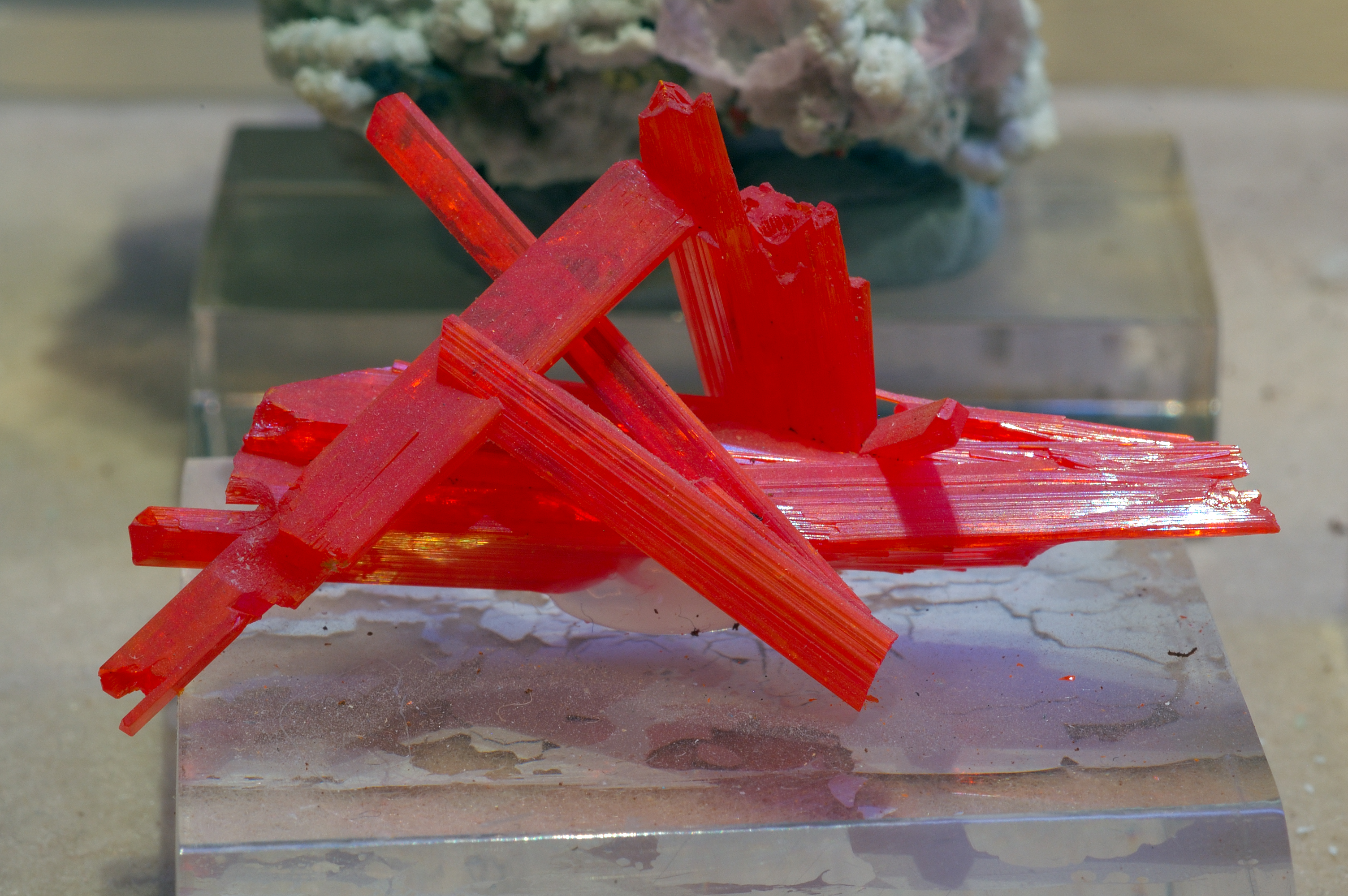
Crocoite specimen from the Red Lead Mine, Tasmania, Australia

The primary chromium ore is the mixed metal oxide chromite, FeCr_{2}O_{4}, found as brittle metallic black crystals or granules. Chromite ore is heated with a mixture of calcium carbonate and sodium carbonate in the presence of air. The chromium is oxidized to the hexavalent form, while the iron forms iron(III) oxide, Fe_{2}O_{3}:

4 FeCr_{2}O_{4} + 8 Na_{2}CO_{3} + 7 O_{2} → 8 Na_{2}CrO_{4} + 2 Fe_{2}O_{3} + 8 CO_{2}

Subsequent leaching of this material at higher temperatures dissolves the chromates, leaving a residue of insoluble iron oxide. Normally the chromate solution is further processed to make chromium metal, but a chromate salt may be obtained directly from the liquor.

Chromate containing minerals are rare. Crocoite, PbCrO_{4}, which can occur as spectacular long red crystals, is the most commonly found chromate mineral. Rare potassium chromate minerals and related compounds are found in the Atacama Desert. Among them is lópezite – the only known dichromate mineral.

As chromate is isostructural to sulfate, sulfate and chromate minerals can form solid solutions such as hashemite, and chromate minerals are often listed alongside sulfate minerals in mineral classification schemes such as Nickel-Strunz classification.

== Toxicity ==
Hexavalent chromium compounds can be toxic and carcinogenic (IARC Group 1). Inhaling particles of hexavalent chromium compounds can cause lung cancer. Also positive associations have been observed between exposure to chromium (VI) compounds and cancer of the nose and nasal sinuses. The use of chromate compounds in manufactured goods is restricted in the EU (and by market commonality the rest of the world) by EU Parliament directive on the Restriction of Hazardous Substances (RoHS) Directive (2002/95/EC).

== See also ==
- Chromate conversion coating
