= Companies and Intellectual Property Commission =

Government agency in South Africa

Agency overview
- Jurisdiction: Government of South Africa
- Headquarters: dtic campus, 77 Meintjies Street, Sunnyside, Pretoria
- Annual budget: R 698.279 million (2022/23)
- Minister responsible: Ebrahim Patel, Minister of Trade, Industry and Competition
- Agency executive: Adv. Rory Voller, Commissioner
- Parent department: Department of Trade, Industry and Competition
- Key documents: Companies Act, 2008; Close Corporations Act, 1984; Patents Act, 1978; Trade Marks Act, 1993; Copyright Act, 1978; The Counterfeit Goods Act, 1997

The Companies and Intellectual Property Commission (CIPC) is an agency of the Department of Trade, Industry and Competition in South Africa. The CIPC was established by the Companies Act, 2008 (Act No. 71 of 2008) as a juristic person to function as an organ of state within the public administration, but as an institution outside the public service.

== History ==
When the 2008 Companies Act came into effect on 1 May 2011, the CIPC was created from the merger of Companies and Intellectual Property Registration Office (CIPRO) and the Office of Company and Intellectual Property Enforcement (OCIPE).

The first months of operation were marked by inefficiency, poor service and large backlogs as the organisation struggled to overcome the legacy of its dysfunctional predecessor, CIPRO.

In April 2013 it was described as "groaning under its own burden of registration under the Companies Act" and suffering from "administrative failures".

In September 2014 the CIPC's new website, intended to automate several routine administrative processes, was criticised as dysfunctional, followed by revelations that the site had no security measures to protect confidential client information.

In February 29, 2024, the commission informed the public that it had experienced an "attempted" security breach and that the personal information of clients and employees had been compromised. The information includes the names and addresses of the registered clients.In a media briefing, South Africa's Information Regulator has launched an independent investigation into the Companies and Intellectual Property Commission (CIPC) following a security breach in its systems. The regulator stated that it had received reports that the perpetrators who hacked the system were still in the CIPC IT environment and that the CIPC systems remained compromised.

== Functions ==
The CIPC is responsible for the following functions:

- Registration of Companies, Co-operatives and Intellectual Property Rights (trademarks, patents, designs and copyright) and maintenance thereof
- To disclose Information on its business registers
- To promote education and awareness of Company and Intellectual Property Law
- To promote compliance with relevant legislation
- Efficiently and effectively enforce relevant legislation
- Monitor compliance with, and contraventions of financial reporting standards, and make recommendations there to the Financial Reporting Standards Council (FRSC)
- Licensing of Business rescue practitioners
- Report, research and advise the Minister on matters of national policy relating to company and intellectual property law.
- Mandates iXBRL format to drive the digital financial reporting.
- Domain registration as of 2024.

== Registration company ==
- cipc.co.za
