= Chromium toxicity =

- Chromium
- Specialty: Toxicology

Chromium toxicity refers to any poisonous toxic effect in an organism or cell that results from exposure to specific forms of chromium—especially hexavalent chromium. Hexavalent chromium and its compounds are toxic when inhaled or ingested. Trivalent chromium is a trace mineral that is essential to human nutrition. There is a hypothetical risk of genotoxicity in humans if large amounts of trivalent chromium were somehow able to enter living cells, but normal metabolism and cell function prevent this.

== Forms of chromium ==
Hexavalent chromium and trivalent chromium are chromium ions—they have different numbers of electrons and, therefore, different properties. Trivalent chromium, or chromium(III), is the form of chromium that is essential to human health. Hexavalent chromium, or chromium(VI), is an unequivocally toxic form.

=== Hexavalent chromium ===
Hexavalent chromium, also called chromium(VI), is hemotoxic, genotoxic, and carcinogenic. When hexavalent chromium enters the bloodstream, it damages blood cells by causing oxidation reactions. This oxidative damage can lead to hemolysis and, ultimately, kidney and liver failure. Patients might be treated with dialysis.

The median lethal dose of hexavalent chromium is 50–150 mg/kg. The World Health Organization recommends a maximum allowable concentration of 0.05 milligrams per litre of chromium(VI) in drinking water. In Europe, the use of hexavalent chromium is regulated by the Restriction of Hazardous Substances Directive.

Hexavalent chromium can be found in some dyes and paints, as well as in some leather tanning products. Primer paint containing hexavalent chromium is widely used in aerospace and automobile refinishing applications. Metal workers (such as welders)—as well as people with a surgical implant made from cobalt-chromium alloy—may also be exposed to hexavalent chromium. Chromium concentrations in whole blood, plasma, serum, or urine may be measured to monitor for safety in exposed workers, to confirm the diagnosis in potential poisoning victims, or to assist in the forensic investigation in a case of fatal overdosage.

In the U.S. state of California, an epidemic of hexavalent chromium exposure led to a class-action lawsuit in 1993: Anderson, et al. v. Pacific Gas and Electric. The Pacific Gas and Electric Company had dumped more than 1.4 billion litres (370 million gallons) of wastewater tainted with hexavalent chromium into the Mojave Desert. This contaminated the groundwater, and caused widespread illness among the people of Hinkley, California, a small community nearby. As of May 2017, the mandated environmental remediation measures are ongoing.

==== Chromate ====
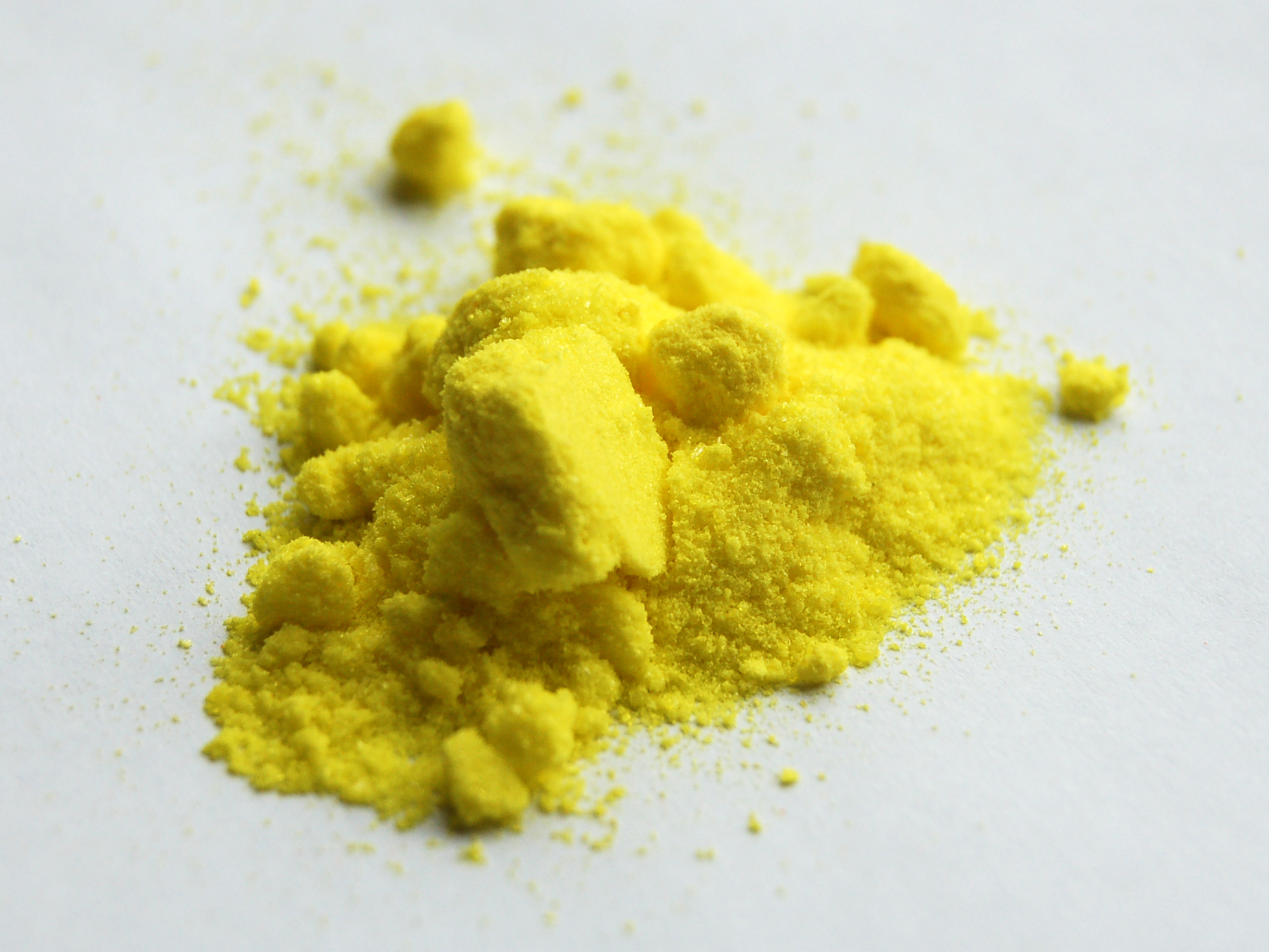
Potassium chromate, a carcinogen, is used in the dyeing of fabrics, and as a tanning agent to produce leather.

Chromates (chromium salts) formed from hexavalent chromium are used to manufacture leather products, paints, cement, mortar, anti-corrosives, and other things. They are carcinogenic and allergenic. The carcinogenity of chromate dust has been documented since the late 19th century, when workers in a chromate dye company were found to exhibit high incidence of cancer. Chromate enters cells by means of the same transport mechanism that carries sulfate and phosphate ions into cells.

Contact with products containing chromates can lead to allergic contact dermatitis and irritant dermatitis, resulting in ulceration of the skin—a condition sometimes called chrome ulcers. Workers that have been exposed to strong chromate solutions in electroplating, tanning, and chrome-producing manufacturers may also develop chrome ulcers. In 1963, an outbreak of dermatitis, ranging from erythema to exudative eczema, occurred amongst 60 automobile factory workers in England. The workers had been wet-sanding chromate-based primer paint that had been applied to car bodies.

==== Genotoxicity ====
Hexavalent chromium is genotoxic: it damages genetic information in living cells, which results in DNA mutations, and possibly the formation of cancerous tumors. As of 2021, the mechanism of the genotoxic action of chromium(VI) is understood to involve the formation of reactive oxygen species as it is reduced to Cr(III), as well as interactions between DNA and Cr(V)/(IV) intermediates in the metabolism of Cr(VI). However, the carcinogenic potential of Cr intermediates and the mechanisms of Cr-induced carcinogenicity remain to be further defined.

The potential genotoxicity of chromium(III) has been explored in recent literature, and it has been observed in vitro generating hydroxyl radicals and binding to DNA; however, in vivo genotoxicity of Cr(III) is not well-established and the toxicity of Cr(III) compounds is generally considered to be at least 100 times lower than that of Cr(VI) compounds. This is in part due to the fact that Cr(III) is not an anion and therefore, unlike Cr(VI) anions like chromate, cannot be transported across cell membranes by anion channels.

=== Trivalent chromium ===
Trivalent chromium, or chromium(III), is an essential trace mineral in the human diet. In some nutritional supplements, chromium(III) occurs as chromium(III) picolinate (in which chromium is bound to picolinic acid) or chromium(III) nicotinate (in which chromium is bound to nicotinic acid). Nicotinic acid is also known as the B vitamin niacin.

Chromium(III) is poorly absorbed in humans; most dietary chromium is excreted in the urine. The threshold for acute oral toxicity is 1900–3300 mg/kg. In rats, nonsteroidal anti-inflammatory drugs such as aspirin and indometacin can increase chromium absorption.

Ordinarily, cellular transport mechanisms in humans and some other animals limit the amount of chromium(III) that enters a cell. Hypothetically, if an excessive amount was able to enter a cell, free radical damage to DNA might result.
