= C18H12CrN3O6 =

The molecular formula C_{18}H_{12}CrN_{3}O_{6} (molar mass: 418.300 g/mol) may refer to:

- Chromium(III) nicotinate
- Chromium(III) picolinate
