= Chromium =

Chromium, _{24}Cr
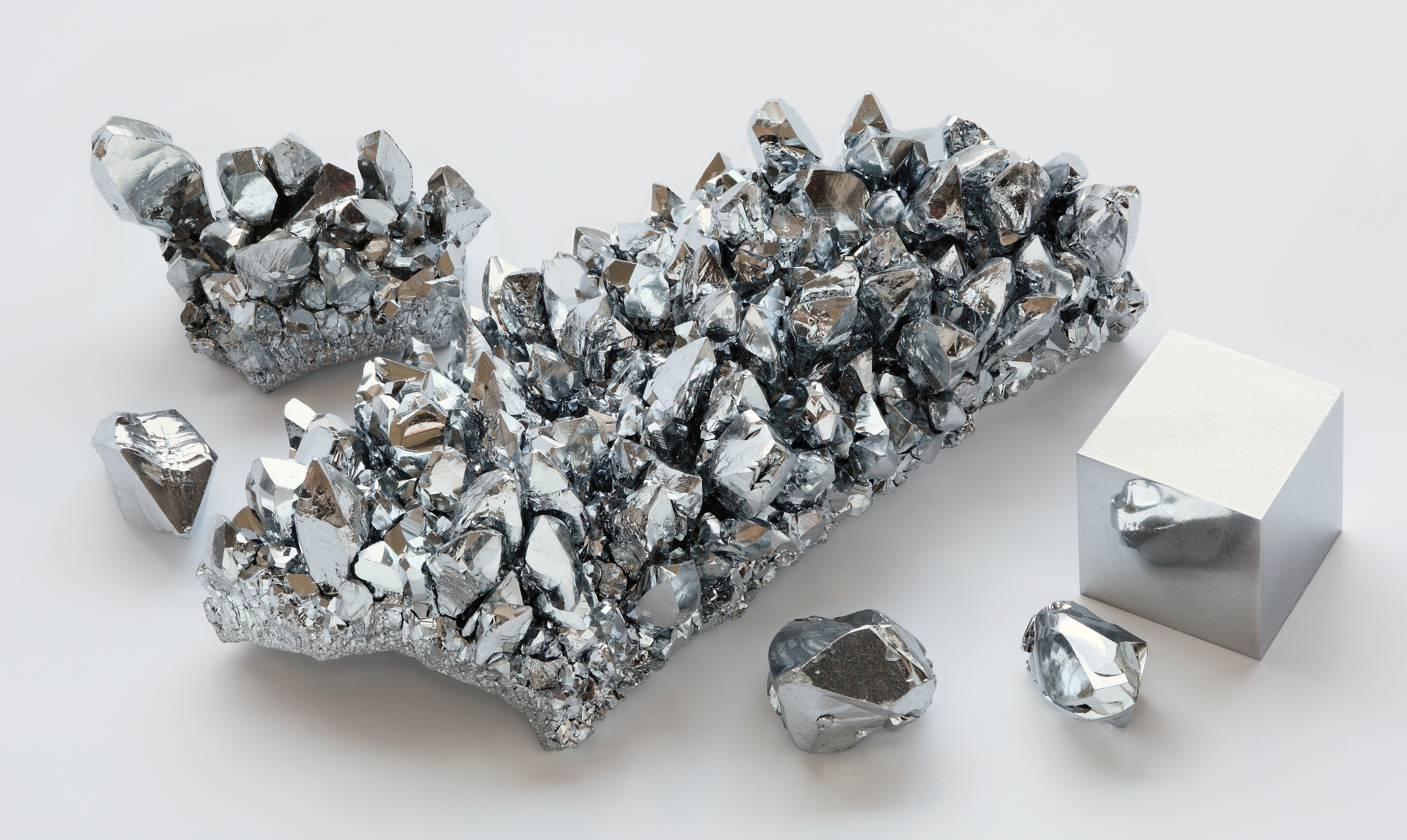

Chromium
- Appearance: silvery metallic

Standard atomic weight A_{r}°(Cr)
- 51.9961±0.0006; 51.996±0.001 (abridged)

Chromium in the periodic table
Hydrogen																															Helium
Lithium	Beryllium																									Boron	Carbon	Nitrogen	Oxygen	Fluorine	Neon
Sodium	Magnesium																									Aluminium	Silicon	Phosphorus	Sulfur	Chlorine	Argon
Potassium	Calcium															Scandium	Titanium	Vanadium	Chromium	Manganese	Iron	Cobalt	Nickel	Copper	Zinc	Gallium	Germanium	Arsenic	Selenium	Bromine	Krypton
Rubidium	Strontium															Yttrium	Zirconium	Niobium	Molybdenum	Technetium	Ruthenium	Rhodium	Palladium	Silver	Cadmium	Indium	Tin	Antimony	Tellurium	Iodine	Xenon
Caesium	Barium	Lanthanum	Cerium	Praseodymium	Neodymium	Promethium	Samarium	Europium	Gadolinium	Terbium	Dysprosium	Holmium	Erbium	Thulium	Ytterbium	Lutetium	Hafnium	Tantalum	Tungsten	Rhenium	Osmium	Iridium	Platinum	Gold	Mercury (element)	Thallium	Lead	Bismuth	Polonium	Astatine	Radon
Francium	Radium	Actinium	Thorium	Protactinium	Uranium	Neptunium	Plutonium	Americium	Curium	Berkelium	Californium	Einsteinium	Fermium	Mendelevium	Nobelium	Lawrencium	Rutherfordium	Dubnium	Seaborgium	Bohrium	Hassium	Meitnerium	Darmstadtium	Roentgenium	Copernicium	Nihonium	Flerovium	Moscovium	Livermorium	Tennessine	Oganesson
–
↑
Cr
↓
Mo
vanadium ← chromium → manganese
- Atomic number (Z): 24
- Group: group 6
- Period: period 4
- Block: d-block
- Electron configuration: [Ar] 3d^{5} 4s^{1}
- Electrons per shell: 2, 8, 13, 1

Physical properties
- Phase at STP: solid
- Melting point: 2180 K (1907 °C, 3465 °F)
- Boiling point: 2944 K (2671 °C, 4840 °F)
- Density (at 20° C): 7.192 g/cm^{3}
- when liquid (at m.p.): 6.3 g/cm^{3}
- Heat of fusion: 21.0 kJ/mol
- Heat of vaporization: 347 kJ/mol
- Molar heat capacity: 23.35 J/(mol·K)
- Specific heat capacity: 449.073 J/(kg·K)
Vapor pressure
P (Pa)	1	10	100	1 k	10 k	100 k
at T (K)	1656	1807	1991	2223	2530	2942

Atomic properties
- Oxidation states: common: +3, +6 −4, −2, −1, 0, +1, +2, +4, +5
- Electronegativity: Pauling scale: 1.66
- Ionization energies: 1st: 652.9 kJ/mol; 2nd: 1590.6 kJ/mol; 3rd: 2987 kJ/mol; (more)
- Atomic radius: empirical: 128 pm
- Covalent radius: 139±5 pm
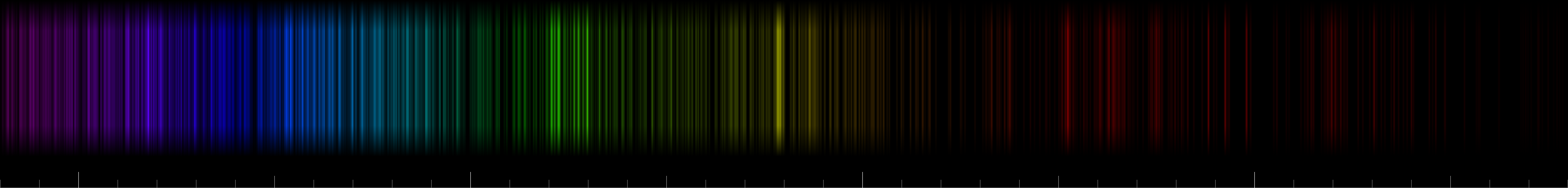
- Spectral lines of chromium

Other properties
- Natural occurrence: primordial
- Crystal structure: body-centered cubic (bcc) (cI2)
- Lattice constant: a = 288.49 pm (at 20 °C)
- Thermal expansion: 4.81×10^{−6}/K (at 20 °C)
- Thermal conductivity: 93.9 W/(m⋅K)
- Electrical resistivity: 125 nΩ⋅m (at 20 °C)
- Magnetic ordering: antiferromagnetic (rather: SDW)
- Molar magnetic susceptibility: +180.0×10^{−6} cm^{3}/mol (273 K)
- Young's modulus: 279 GPa
- Shear modulus: 115 GPa
- Bulk modulus: 160 GPa
- Speed of sound thin rod: 5940 m/s (at 20 °C)
- Poisson ratio: 0.21
- Mohs hardness: 8.5
- Vickers hardness: 1060 MPa
- Brinell hardness: 687–6500 MPa
- CAS Number: 7440-47-3

History
- Naming: from the Greek χρῶμα, "color", because many chromium compounds are intensely colored
- Discovery and first isolation: Louis Nicolas Vauquelin (1794, 1797)

Isotopes of chromium
Main isotopes			Decay	
Isotope	abundance	half-life (t_{1/2})	mode	product
^{50}Cr	4.345%	stable		
^{51}Cr	synth	27.7015 d	ε	^{51}V
^{52}Cr	83.789%	stable		
^{53}Cr	9.501%	stable		
^{54}Cr	2.365%	stable		

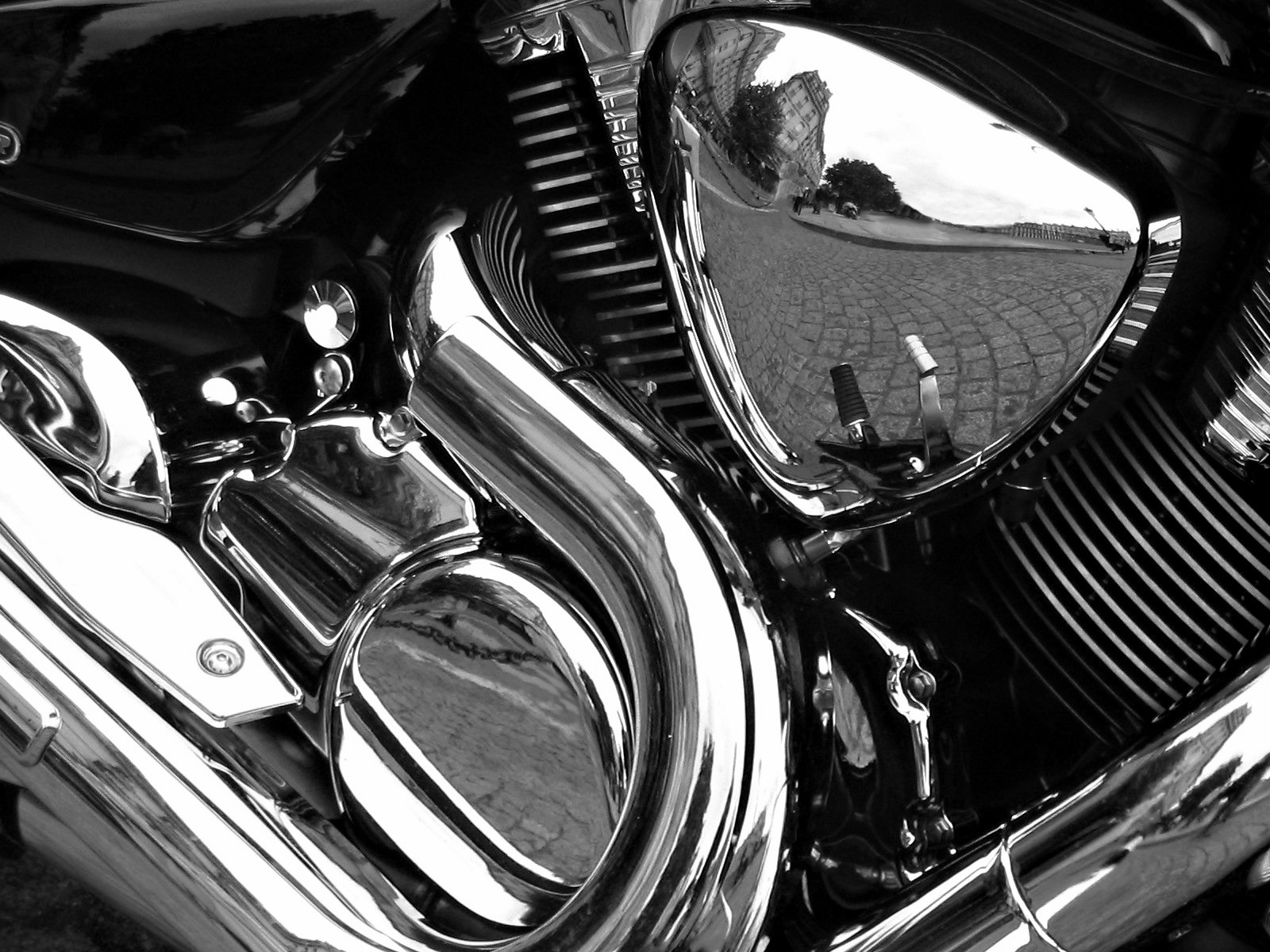
"Chrome plated" motorcycle parts, plated with a decorative layer of chromium

Chromium is a chemical element; it has symbol Cr and atomic number 24. It is the first element in group 6. It is a steely-grey, lustrous, hard, and brittle transition metal.

Chromium is valued for its high corrosion resistance and hardness. A major development in steel production was the discovery that steel could be made highly resistant to corrosion and discoloration by adding metallic chromium to form stainless steel. Stainless steel and chrome plating (electroplating with chromium) together comprise 85% of the commercial use. Chromium is also greatly valued as a metal that is able to be highly polished while resisting tarnishing. Polished chromium reflects almost 70% of the visible spectrum, and almost 90% of infrared light. The name of the element is derived from the Greek word χρῶμα, chrōma, meaning color, because many chromium compounds are intensely colored.

Industrial production of chromium proceeds from chromite ore (mostly FeCr_{2}O_{4}) to produce ferrochromium, an iron-chromium alloy, by means of aluminothermic or silicothermic reactions. Ferrochromium is then used to produce alloys such as stainless steel. Pure chromium metal is produced by a different process: roasting and leaching of chromite to separate it from iron, followed by reduction with carbon and then aluminium.

Trivalent chromium (Cr(III)) occurs naturally in many foods and is sold as a dietary supplement, although there is insufficient evidence that dietary chromium provides nutritional benefit to people. In 2014, the European Food Safety Authority concluded that research on dietary chromium did not justify it to be recognized as an essential nutrient.

While chromium metal and Cr(III) ions are considered non-toxic, chromate and its derivatives, often called "hexavalent chromium", is toxic and carcinogenic. According to the European Chemicals Agency (ECHA), chromium trioxide that is used in industrial electroplating processes is a "substance of very high concern" (SVHC).

== Physical properties ==
=== Atomic ===
Gaseous chromium has a ground-state electron configuration of [Ar] 3d^{5} 4s^{1}. It is the first element in the periodic table whose configuration violates the Aufbau principle. Exceptions to the principle also occur later in the periodic table for elements such as copper, niobium and molybdenum.

Chromium is the first element in the 3d series where the 3d electrons start to sink into the core; they thus contribute less to metallic bonding, and hence the melting and boiling points and the enthalpy of atomisation of chromium are lower than those of the preceding element vanadium. Chromium(VI) is a strong oxidising agent in contrast to the molybdenum(VI) and tungsten(VI) oxides.

=== Bulk ===
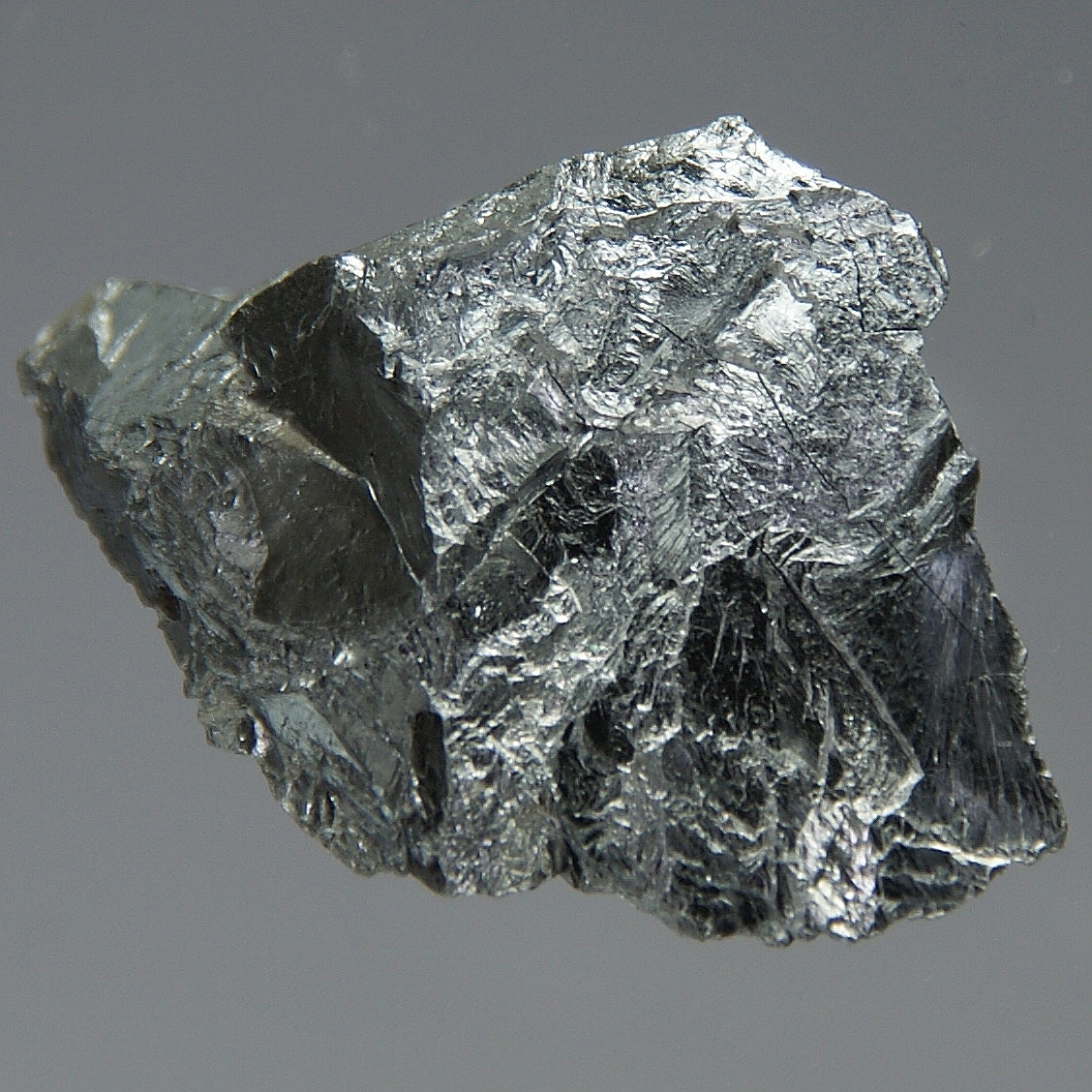
Sample of chromium metal

Chromium is the third hardest element after carbon (diamond) and boron. Its Mohs hardness is 8.5, which means that it can scratch samples of quartz and topaz, but can be scratched by corundum. Chromium is highly resistant to tarnishing, which makes it useful as a metal that preserves its outermost layer from corroding, unlike other metals such as copper, magnesium, and aluminium.

Chromium has a melting point of 1907 °C (3465 °F), which is relatively low compared to the majority of transition metals. However, it still has the second highest melting point out of all the period 4 elements, being topped by vanadium by 3 °C (5 °F) at 1910 °C (3470 °F). The boiling point of 2671 °C (4840 °F), however, is comparatively lower, having the fourth lowest boiling point out of the Period 4 transition metals alone behind copper, manganese and zinc. (Note: The melting/boiling point of transition metals are usually higher compared to the alkali metals, alkaline earth metals, and nonmetals, which is why the range of elements compared to chromium differed between comparisons) The electrical resistivity of chromium at 20 °C is 125 nanoohm-meters.

Chromium has a high specular reflection in comparison to other transition metals. In infrared, at 425 μm, chromium has a maximum reflectance of about 72%, decreasing to a minimum of 62% at 750 μm before increasing again to 90% at 4000 μm. When chromium is used in stainless steel alloys and polished, the specular reflection decreases with the inclusion of additional metals, yet is still high in comparison with other alloys. Between 40% and 60% of the visible spectrum is reflected from polished stainless steel. Chromium's high reflectivity, especially the 90% in infrared, can be attributed to chromium's magnetic properties. Chromium has unique magnetic properties; it is the only elemental solid that shows antiferromagnetic ordering at room temperature and below. Above 38 °C, its magnetic ordering becomes paramagnetic. The antiferromagnetic properties, which cause the chromium atoms to temporarily ionize and bond with themselves, are present because the body-centric cubic's magnetic properties are disproportionate to the lattice periodicity. This is due to the magnetic moments at the cube's corners and the unequal, but antiparallel, cube centers. The frequency-dependent relative permittivity of chromium, deriving from Maxwell's equations and chromium's antiferromagnetism, results in increased reflectance at infrared and visible wavelengths.

==== Passivation ====
Chromium metal in air is passivated: it forms a thin, protective surface layer of chromium oxide with the corundum structure. Passivation can be enhanced by short contact with oxidizing acids like nitric acid. Passivated chromium is stable against acids. Passivation can be removed with a strong reducing agent that destroys the protective oxide layer on the metal. Chromium metal treated in this way readily dissolves in weak acids.

The surface chromia Cr_{2}O_{3} scale is adherent to the metal. In contrast, iron forms a more porous oxide which is weak and flakes easily and exposes fresh metal to the air, causing continued rusting. At room temperature, the chromia scale is a few atomic layers thick, growing in thickness by outward diffusion of metal ions across the scale. Above 950 °C volatile chromium trioxide CrO_{3} forms from the chromia scale, limiting the scale thickness and oxidation protection.

Chromium, unlike iron and nickel, does not suffer from hydrogen embrittlement. However, it does suffer from nitrogen embrittlement, reacting with nitrogen from air and forming brittle nitrides at the high temperatures necessary to work the metal parts.

=== Isotopes ===
Naturally occurring chromium is composed of four stable isotopes; ^{50}Cr, ^{52}Cr, ^{53}Cr and ^{54}Cr, with ^{52}Cr being the most abundant (83.789% natural abundance). Twenty-five radioisotopes have been characterized, ranging from ^{42}Cr to ^{70}Cr; the most stable radioisotope is ^{51}Cr with a half-life of 27.70 days. All of the remaining radioactive isotopes have half-lives that are less than a day and the majority less than a minute. Chromium also has two metastable nuclear isomers.

The primary decay mode before the most abundant stable isotope, ^{52}Cr, is electron capture and the primary mode after is beta decay.

^{53}Cr is the radiogenic decay product of ^{53}Mn (half-life 3.7 million years). Chromium and manganese are found together sufficiently for measurement of both to find application in isotope geology. Manganese-chromium isotope ratios reinforce the evidence from ^{26}Al and ^{107}Pd concerning the early history of the Solar System. Variations in ^{53}Cr/^{52}Cr and Mn/Cr ratios from several meteorites indicate a non-zero initial ^{53}Mn/^{55}Mn ratio that suggests Cr isotopic composition variations must result from in-situ decay of ^{53}>Mn in differentiated planetary bodies. Hence ^{53}Cr provides additional evidence for nucleosynthetic processes immediately before coalescence of the Solar System.

The ratio ^{53}Cr/^{52}Cr has also been posited as a proxy for atmospheric oxygen concentration.

== Chemistry and compounds ==
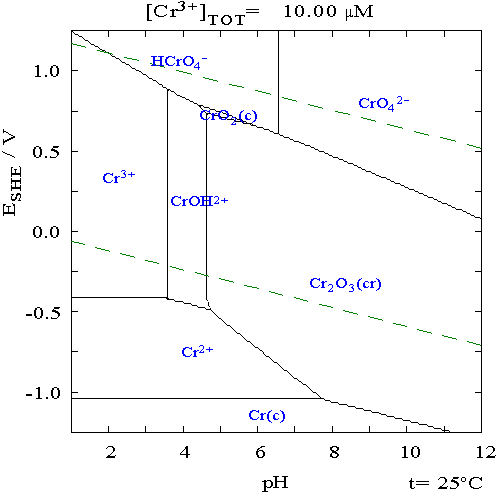
The Pourbaix diagram for chromium in pure water, perchloric acid, or sodium hydroxide

Chromium is a member of group 6, of the transition metals. The +3 and +6 states occur most commonly within chromium compounds, followed by +2; charges of +1, +4 and +5 for chromium are rare, but do nevertheless occasionally exist.

Oxidation states (Note: Most common oxidation states of chromium are in bold. The right column lists a representative compound for each oxidation state.)
−4 (d^{10})	Na_{4}Cr(CO)_{4}
−2 (d^{8})	Na_{2}Cr(CO)_{5}
−1 (d^{7})	Na_{2}Cr_{2}(CO)_{10}
0 (d^{6})	Cr(C_{6}H_{6})_{2}
+1 (d^{5})	K_{3}Cr(CN)_{5}NO
+2 (d^{4})	CrCl_{2}
+3 (d^{3})	CrCl_{3}
+4 (d^{2})	K_{2}CrF_{6}
+5 (d^{1})	K_{3}Cr(O_{2})_{4}
+6 (d^{0})	K_{2}CrO_{4}

=== Chromium(III) ===
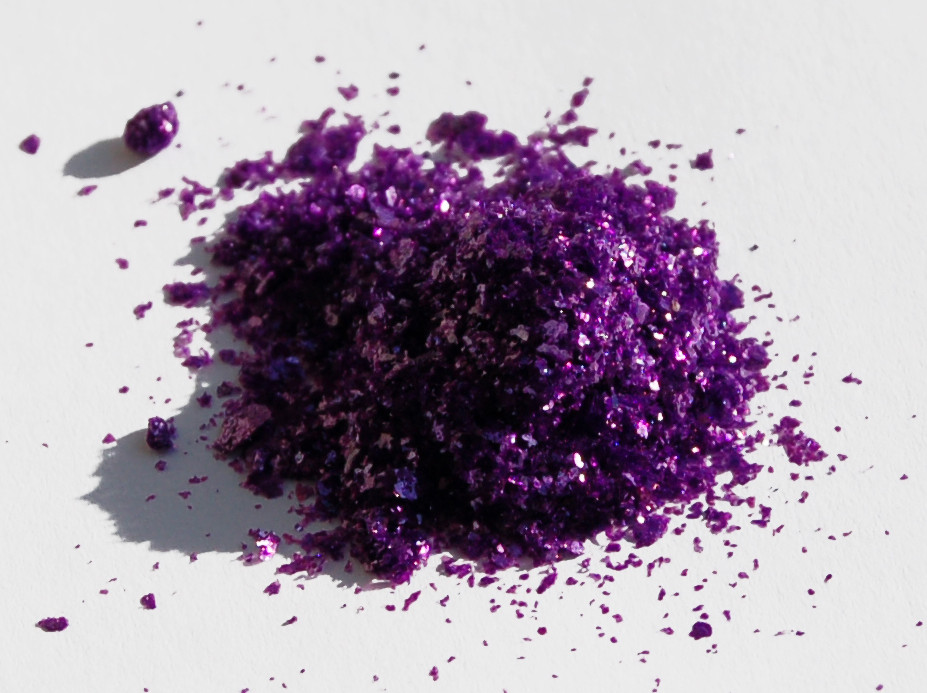
Anhydrous chromium(III) chloride (CrCl_{3})

A large number of chromium(III) compounds are known, such as chromium(III) nitrate, chromium(III) acetate, and chromium(III) oxide. Chromium(III) can be obtained by dissolving elemental chromium in acids like hydrochloric acid or sulfuric acid, but it can also be formed through the reduction of chromium(VI) by cytochrome c7. The Cr^{3+} ion has a similar radius (63 pm) to Al^{3+} (radius 50 pm), and they can replace each other in some compounds, such as in chrome alum and alum.

Chromium(III) tends to form octahedral complexes. Commercially available chromium(III) chloride hydrate is the dark green complex [CrCl_{2}(H_{2}O)_{4}]Cl. Closely related compounds are the pale green [CrCl(H_{2}O)_{5}]Cl_{2} and violet [Cr(H_{2}O)_{6}]Cl_{3}. If anhydrous violet chromium(III) chloride is dissolved in water, the violet solution turns green after some time as the chloride in the inner coordination sphere is replaced by water. This kind of reaction is also observed with solutions of chrome alum and other water-soluble chromium(III) salts. A tetrahedral coordination of chromium(III) has been reported for the Cr-centered Keggin anion [α−CrW_{12}O_{40}]^{5−}.

Chromium(III) hydroxide (Cr(OH)_{3}) is amphoteric, dissolving in acidic solutions to form [Cr(H_{2}O)_{6}]^{3+}, and in basic solutions to form [Cr(OH)_{4}(H_{2}O)_{2}]^{−}. It is dehydrated by heating to form the green chromium(III) oxide (Cr_{2}O_{3}), a stable oxide with a crystal structure identical to that of corundum.

=== Chromium(VI) ===
Chromium(VI) compounds are oxidants at low or neutral pH. Chromate anions (CrO_{4}^{2−}) and dichromate (Cr_{2}O_{7}^{2−}) anions are the principal ions at this oxidation state. They exist at an equilibrium, determined by pH:

2 CrO_{4}^{2−} + 2 H^{+} ⇌ Cr_{2}O_{7}^{2−} + H_{2}O

Chromium(VI) oxyhalides are known also and include chromyl fluoride (CrO_{2}F_{2}) and chromyl chloride (CrO_{2}Cl_{2}). However, despite several erroneous claims, chromium hexafluoride (as well as all higher hexahalides) remains unknown, as of 2020.

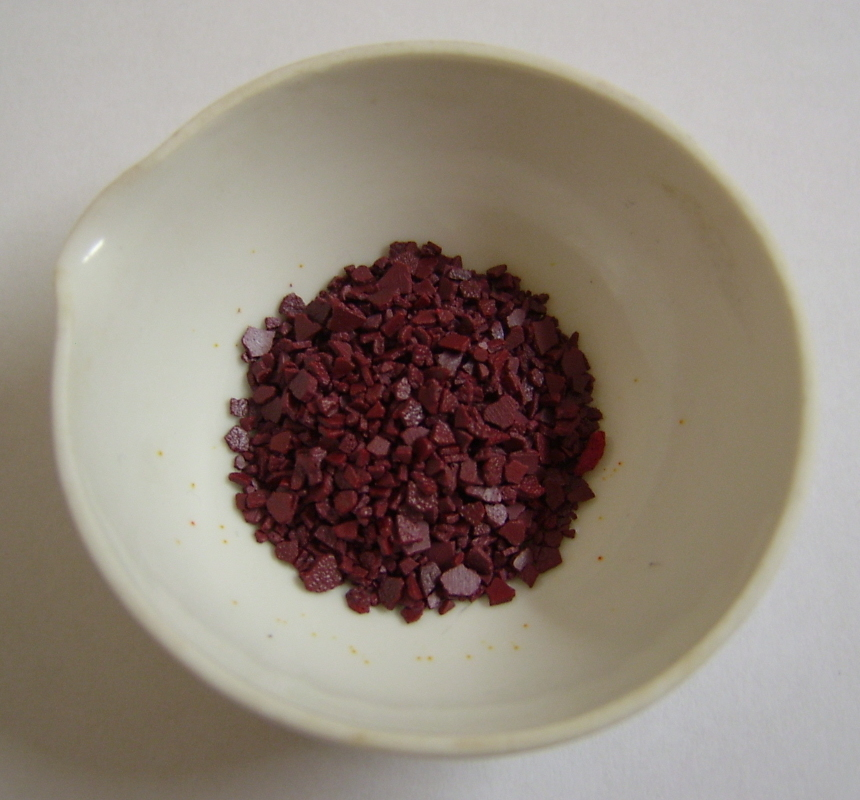
Chromium(VI) oxide

Sodium chromate is produced industrially by the oxidative roasting of chromite ore with sodium carbonate. The change in equilibrium is visible by a change from yellow (chromate) to orange (dichromate), such as when an acid is added to a neutral solution of potassium chromate. At yet lower pH values, further condensation to more complex oxyanions of chromium is possible.

Both the chromate and dichromate anions are strong oxidizing reagents at low pH:

Cr_{2}O_{7}^{2−} + 14 H_{3}O^{+} + 6 e^{−} → 2 Cr^{3+} + 21 H_{2}O (E^{θ} = 1.33 V)

They are, however, only moderately oxidizing at high pH:

CrO_{4}^{2−} + 4 H_{2}O + 3 e^{−} → Cr(OH)_{3} + 5 OH^{−} (E^{θ} = −0.13 V)

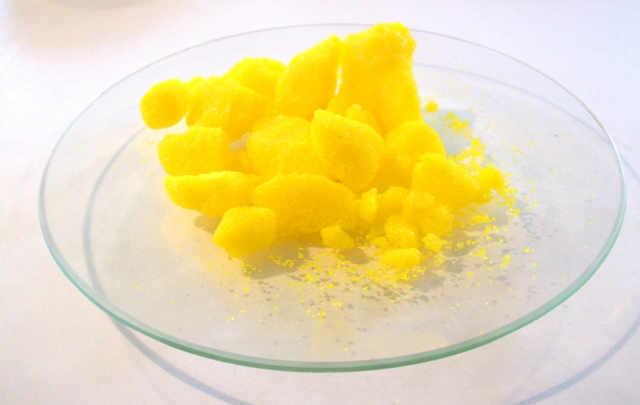
Sodium chromate (Na_{2}CrO_{4})

Chromium(VI) compounds in solution can be detected by adding an acidic hydrogen peroxide solution. The unstable dark blue chromium(VI) peroxide (CrO(O_{2})_{2}) is formed, which can be stabilized as an ether adduct CrO(O_{2})_{2}·OR_{2}.

Chromic acid has the hypothetical formula H_{2}CrO_{4}. It is a vaguely described chemical, despite many well-defined chromates and dichromates being known. The dark red chromium(VI) oxide CrO_{3}, the acid anhydride of chromic acid, is sold industrially as "chromic acid". It can be produced by mixing sulfuric acid with dichromate and is a strong oxidizing agent.

=== Other oxidation states ===
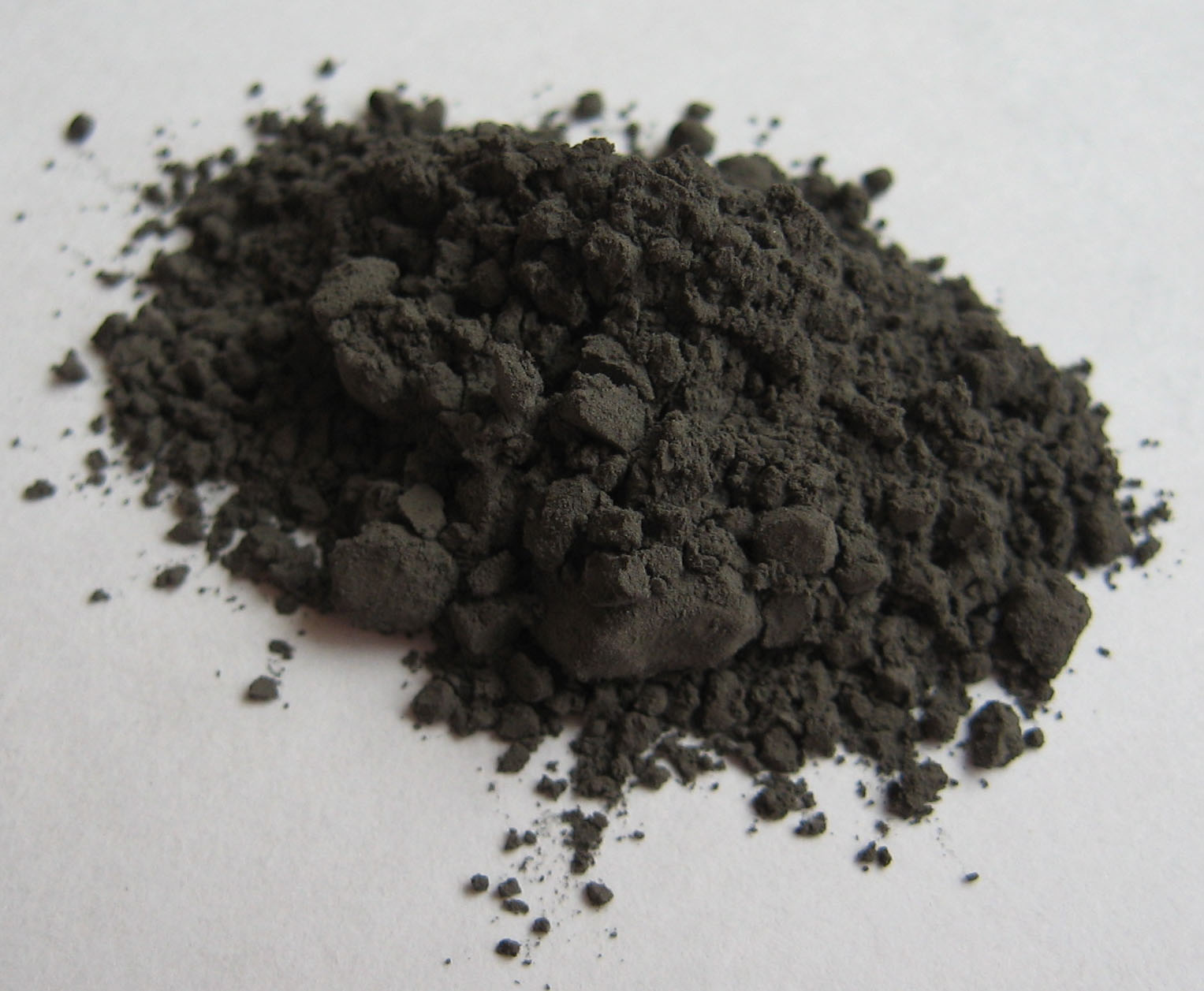
Chromium(II) carbide (Cr_{3}C_{2})

Chromium(II) compounds are uncommon, in part because they readily oxidize to chromium(III) derivatives in air. Water-stable chromium(II) chloride CrCl_{2} can be made by reducing chromium(III) chloride with zinc. The resulting bright blue solution created from dissolving chromium(II) chloride is stable at neutral pH. Some other notable chromium(II) compounds include chromium(II) oxide CrO, and chromium(II) sulfate CrSO_{4}. Many chromium(II) carboxylates are known. The red chromium(II) acetate (Cr_{2}(CH_{3}COO)_{4}) is somewhat famous. It features a Cr-Cr quadruple bond.

Compounds of chromium(V) are rather rare; the oxidation state +5 is only realized in few compounds but are intermediates in many reactions involving oxidations by chromate. The only binary compound is the volatile chromium(V) fluoride (CrF_{5}). This red solid has a melting point of 30 °C and a boiling point of 117 °C. It can be prepared by treating chromium metal with fluorine at 400 °C and 200 bar pressure. The peroxochromate(V) is another example of the +5 oxidation state. Potassium peroxochromate (K_{3}Cr(O_{2})_{4}) is made by reacting potassium chromate with hydrogen peroxide at low temperatures. This red brown compound is stable at room temperature but decomposes spontaneously at 150–170 °C.

Compounds of chromium(IV) are slightly more common than those of chromium(V). The tetrahalides, CrF_{4}, CrCl_{4}, and CrBr_{4}, can be produced by treating the trihalides (CrX_{3}) with the corresponding halogen at elevated temperatures. Such compounds are susceptible to disproportionation reactions and are not stable in water. Organic compounds containing Cr(IV) state such as chromium tetra t-butoxide are also known.

Many Cr(0) complexes are known. Bis(benzene)chromium and chromium hexacarbonyl are highlights in organochromium chemistry.

Most chromium(I) compounds are obtained solely by oxidation of electron-rich, octahedral chromium(0) complexes. Other chromium(I) complexes contain cyclopentadienyl ligands. As verified by X-ray diffraction, a Cr-Cr quintuple bond (length 183.51(4) pm) has also been described. Extremely bulky monodentate ligands stabilize this compound by shielding the quintuple bond from further reactions.

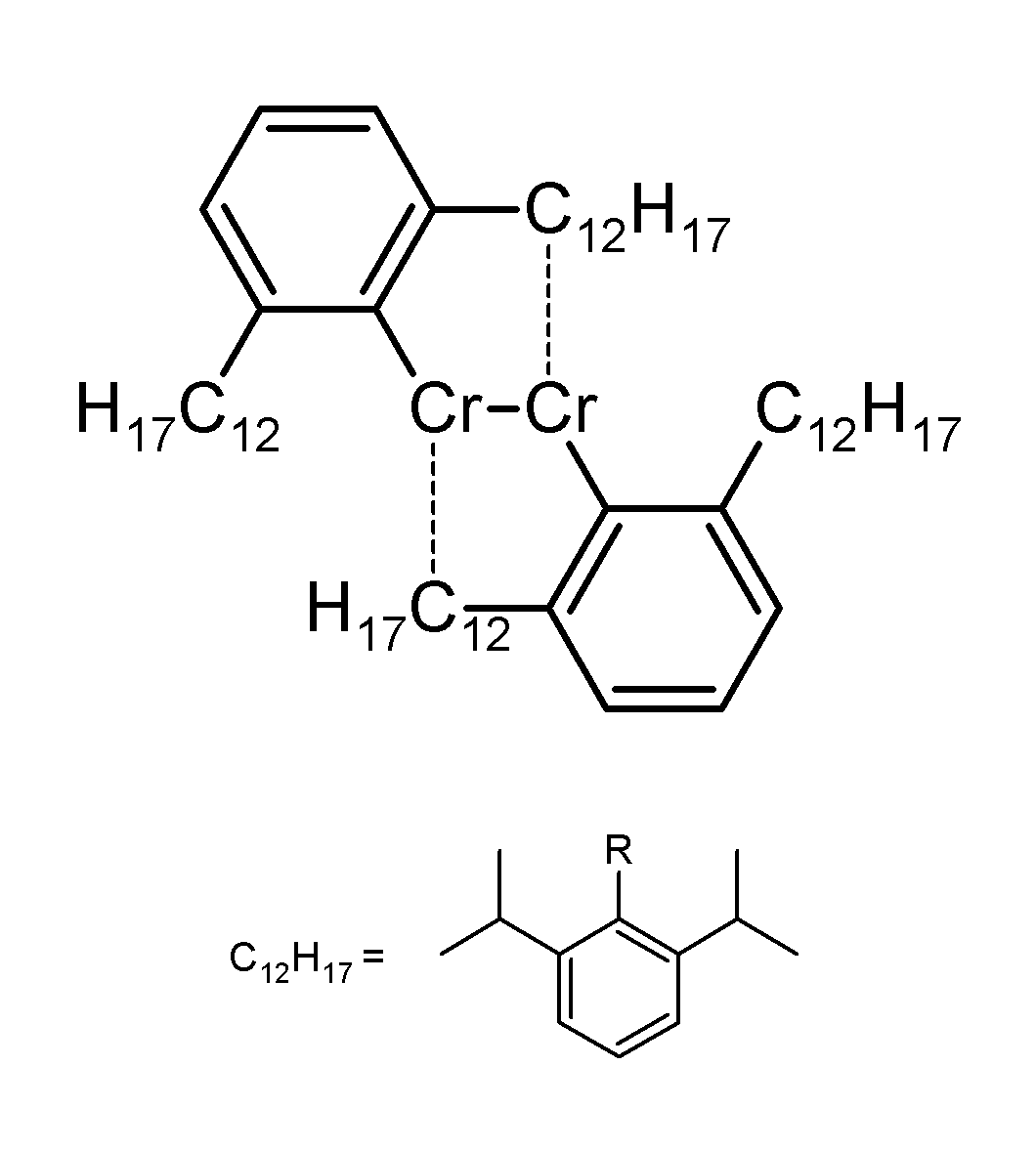
Chromium compound determined experimentally to contain a Cr-Cr quintuple bond

== Occurrence ==
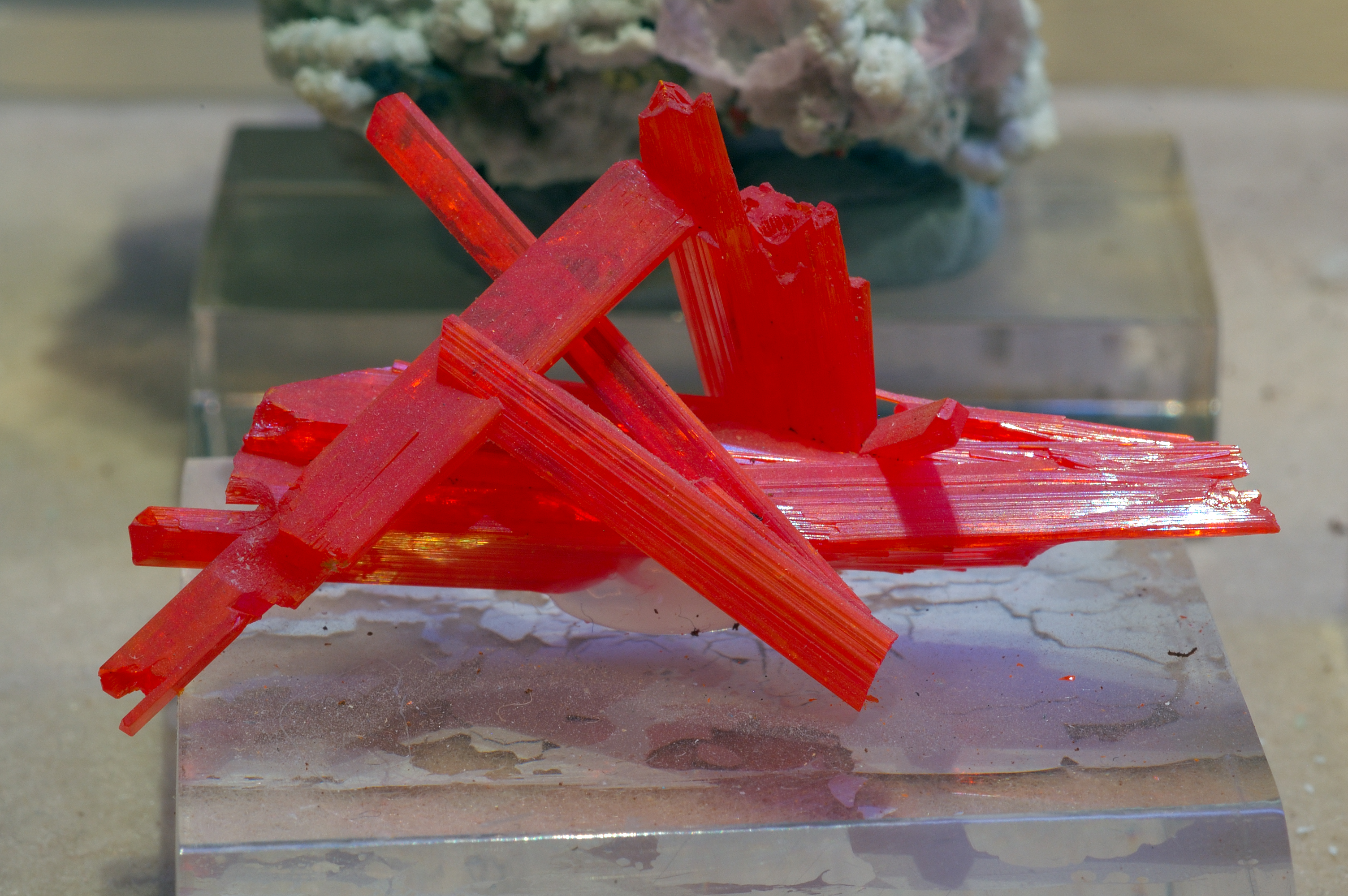
Crocoite (PbCrO_{4})

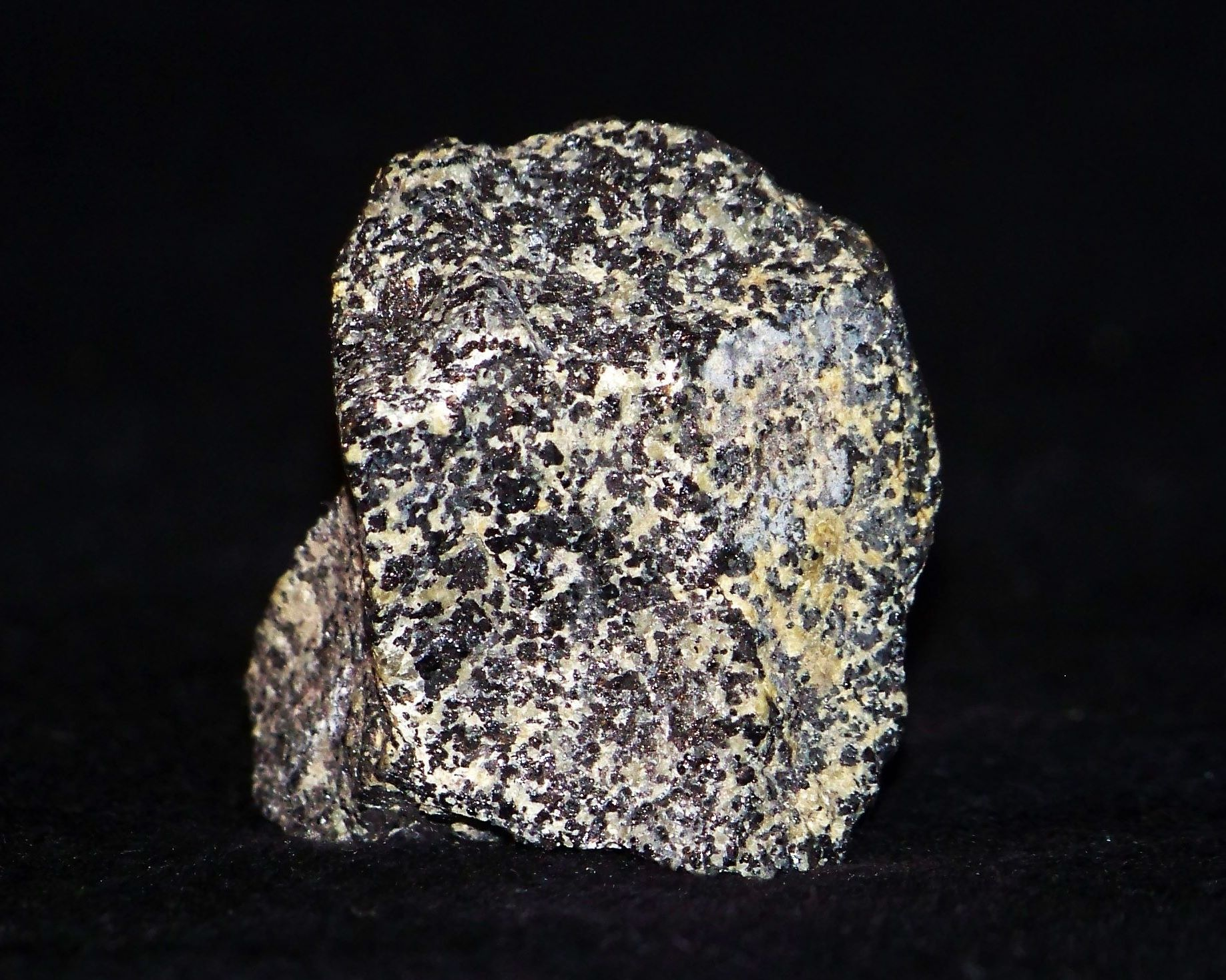
Chromite ore

Chromium is the 21st most abundant element in Earth's crust with an average concentration of 100 ppm. Chromium compounds are found in the environment from the erosion of chromium-containing rocks, and can be redistributed by volcanic eruptions. Typical background concentrations of chromium in environmental media are: atmosphere <10 ng/m^{3}; soil <500 mg/kg; vegetation <0.5 mg/kg; freshwater <10 μg/L; seawater <1 μg/L; sediment <80 mg/kg. Chromium is mined as chromite (FeCr_{2}O_{4}) ore.

About two-fifths of the chromite ores and concentrates in the world are produced in South Africa, about a third in Kazakhstan, while India, Russia, and Turkey are also substantial producers. Untapped chromite deposits are plentiful, but geographically concentrated in Kazakhstan and southern Africa. Although rare, deposits of native chromium exist. The Udachnaya Pipe in Russia produces samples of the native metal. This mine is a kimberlite pipe, rich in diamonds, and the reducing environment helped produce both elemental chromium and diamonds.

The relation between Cr(III) and Cr(VI) strongly depends on pH and oxidative properties of the location. In most cases, Cr(III) is the dominating species, but in some areas, the ground water can contain up to 39 μg/L of total chromium, of which 30 μg/L is Cr(VI).

== History ==
=== Early applications ===
Chromium was not used anywhere until the experiments of French pharmacist and chemist Nicolas Louis Vauquelin (1763–1829) in the late 1790s.

From the 1970s, until 2019, it was widely believed that the technique of chromium plating to prevent metal corrosion had been invented in ancient China. This technique was thought to have been used, for example, to protect bronze artifacts such as arrowheads and sword blades buried as grave goods in the mausoleum of the First Emperor of Qin. However, a detailed scientific investigation in 2019 revealed that the chromium found on these artifacts originated naturally from the lacquer applied to them. Scientists now believe that the excellent preservation of the artifacts was not due to intentional chromium plating, but rather to the burial environment: the soil was fine-grained and alkaline, which limited aeration and the growth of organic matter, thereby creating optimal conditions for metal preservation.

Chromium minerals as pigments came to the attention of the west in the eighteenth century. On 26 July 1761, Johann Gottlob Lehmann found an orange-red mineral in the Beryozovskoye mines in the Ural Mountains which he named Siberian red lead. Though misidentified as a lead compound with selenium and iron components, the mineral was in fact crocoite with a formula of PbCrO_{4}. In 1770, Peter Simon Pallas visited the same site as Lehmann and found a red lead mineral that was discovered to possess useful properties as a pigment in paints. After Pallas, the use of Siberian red lead as a paint pigment began to develop rapidly throughout the region. Crocoite would be the principal source of chromium in pigments until the discovery of chromite many years later.

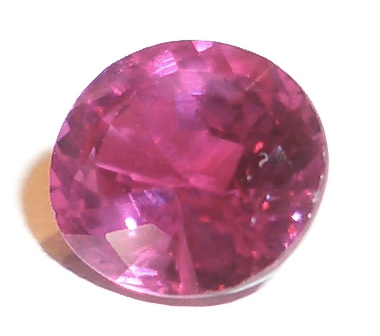
The red color of rubies is due to trace amounts of chromium within the corundum.

In 1794, Louis Nicolas Vauquelin received samples of crocoite ore. He produced chromium trioxide (CrO_{3}) by mixing crocoite with hydrochloric acid. In 1797, Vauquelin discovered that he could isolate metallic chromium by heating the oxide in a charcoal oven, for which he is credited as the one who truly discovered the element. Vauquelin was also able to detect traces of chromium in precious gemstones, such as ruby and emerald.

During the nineteenth century, chromium was primarily used not only as a component of paints, but in tanning salts as well. For quite some time, the crocoite found in Russia was the main source for such tanning materials. In 1827, a larger chromite deposit was discovered near Baltimore, United States, which quickly met the demand for tanning salts much more adequately than the crocoite that had been used previously. This made the United States the largest producer of chromium products until the year 1848, when larger deposits of chromite were uncovered near the city of Bursa, Turkey. With the development of metallurgy and chemical industries in the Western world, the need for chromium increased.

Chromium is also famous for its reflective, metallic luster when polished. It is used as a protective and decorative coating on car parts, plumbing fixtures, furniture parts and many other items, usually applied by electroplating. Chromium was used for electroplating as early as 1848, but this use only became widespread with the development of an improved process in 1924.

== Production ==
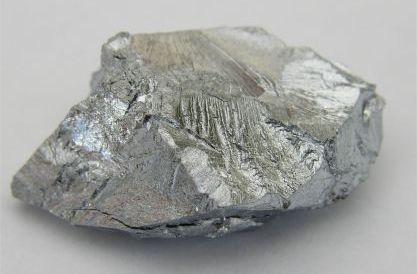
Piece of chromium produced with aluminothermic reaction

World production trend of chromium

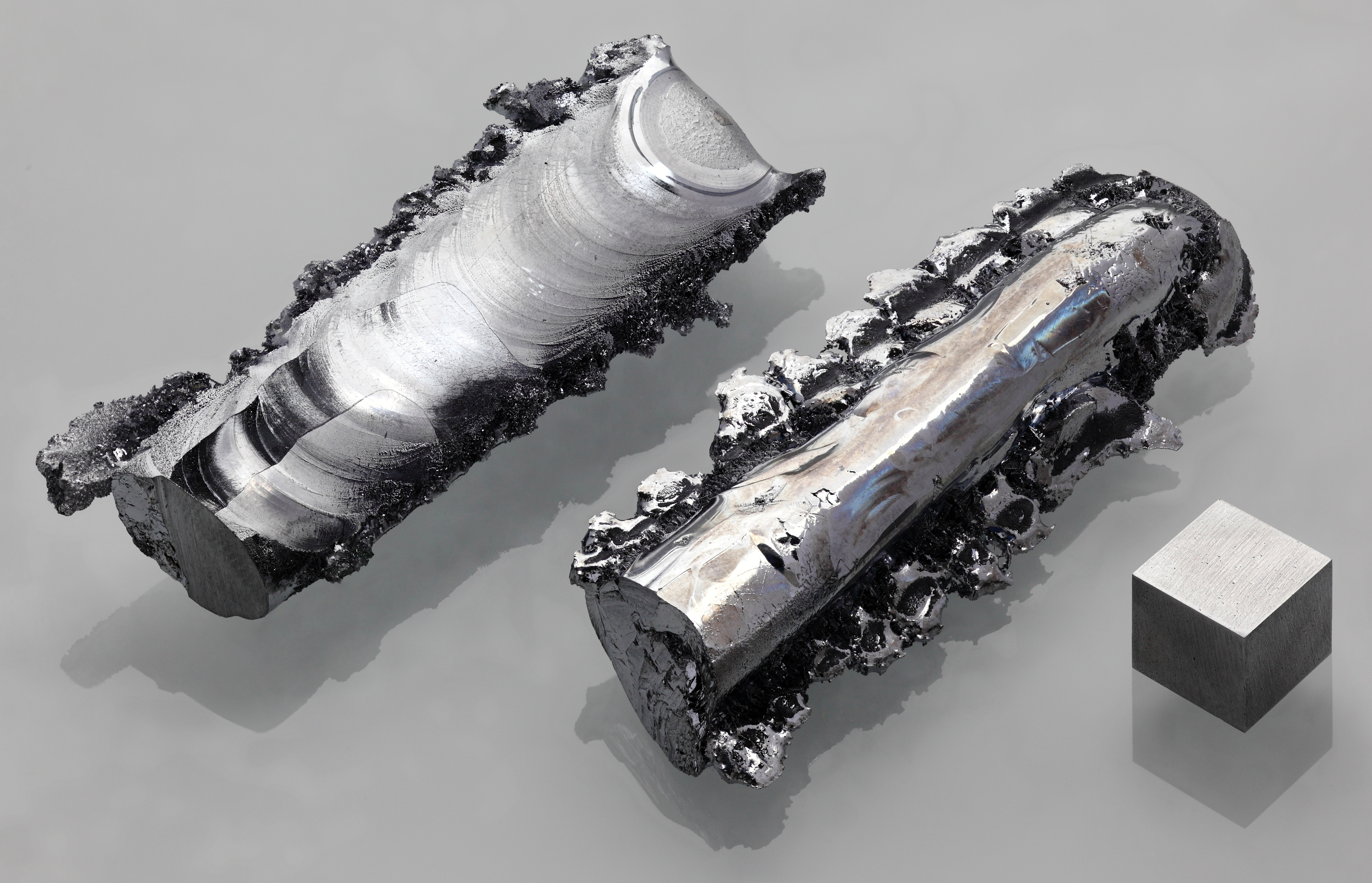
Chromium, remelted in a horizontal arc zone-refiner, showing large visible crystal grains

Approximately 28.8 million metric tons (Mt) of marketable chromite ore was produced in 2013, and converted into 7.5 Mt of ferrochromium. According to John F. Papp, writing for the USGS, "Ferrochromium is the leading end use of chromite ore, [and] stainless steel is the leading end use of ferrochromium."

The largest producers of chromium ore in 2013 have been South Africa (48%), Kazakhstan (13%), Turkey (11%), and India (10%), with several other countries producing the rest of about 18% of the world production.

The two main products of chromium ore refining are ferrochromium and metallic chromium. For those products the ore smelter process differs considerably. For the production of ferrochromium, the chromite ore (FeCr_{2}O_{4}) is reduced in large scale in electric arc furnace or in smaller smelters with either aluminium or silicon in an aluminothermic reaction. For the production of pure chromium, the iron must be separated from the chromium in a two step roasting and leaching process. The chromite ore is heated with a mixture of calcium carbonate and sodium carbonate in the presence of air. The chromium is oxidized to the hexavalent form, while the iron forms the stable Fe_{2}O_{3}. The subsequent leaching at higher elevated temperatures dissolves the chromates and leaves the insoluble iron oxide. The chromate is converted by sulfuric acid into the dichromate.

4 FeCr_{2}O_{4} + 8 Na_{2}CO_{3} + 7 O_{2} → 8 Na_{2}CrO_{4} + 2 Fe_{2}O_{3} + 8 CO_{2}

2 Na_{2}CrO_{4} + H_{2}SO_{4} → Na_{2}Cr_{2}O_{7} + Na_{2}SO_{4} + H_{2}O

The dichromate is converted to the chromium(III) oxide by reduction with carbon and then reduced in an aluminothermic reaction to chromium.

Na_{2}Cr_{2}O_{7} + 2 C → Cr_{2}O_{3} + Na_{2}CO_{3} + CO

Cr_{2}O_{3} + 2 Al → Al_{2}O_{3} + 2 Cr

Chromium ore output in 2002

=== By country ===
Chromium production by country in thousands of tonnes (2024)
Country	Production	Reserves
World	47,000	1,200,000
South Africa	21,000	200,000
Turkey	8,000	27,000
Kazakhstan	6,500	320,000
India	4,100	79,000
Other countries	2,900	–
Finland	1,900	8,300
Brazil	1,400	6,600
Zimbabwe	1,100	540,000
United States	–	630

== Applications ==
The creation of metal alloys account for 85% of the available chromium's usage. The remainder of chromium is used in the chemical, refractory, and foundry industries.

=== Metallurgy ===
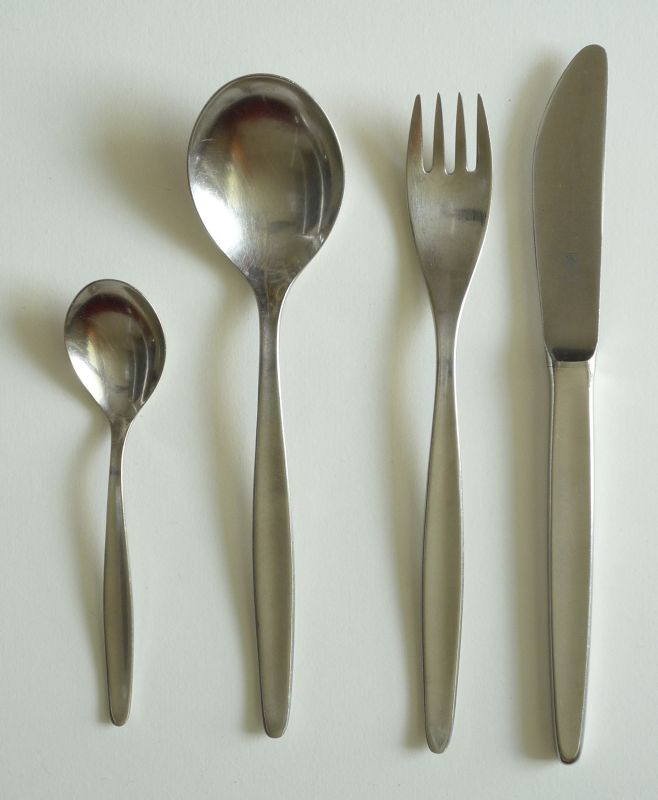
Stainless steel cutlery made from Cromargan 18/10, containing 18% chromium

The strengthening effect of forming stable metal carbides at grain boundaries, and the strong increase in corrosion resistance made chromium an important alloying material for steel. High-speed tool steels contain 3–5% chromium. Stainless steel, the primary corrosion-resistant metal alloy, is formed when chromium is introduced to iron in concentrations above 11%. For stainless steel's formation, ferrochromium is added to the molten iron. Also, nickel-based alloys have increased strength due to the formation of discrete, stable, metal, carbide particles at the grain boundaries. For example, Inconel 718 contains 18.6% chromium. Because of the excellent high-temperature properties of these nickel superalloys, they are used in jet engines and gas turbines in lieu of common structural materials. ASTM B163 relies on chromium for condenser and heat-exchanger tubes, while castings with high strength at elevated temperatures that contain chromium are standardised with ASTM A567. AISI type 332 is used where high temperature would normally cause carburization, oxidation or corrosion. Incoloy 800 "is capable of remaining stable and maintaining its austenitic structure even after long time exposures to high temperatures". Nichrome is used as resistance wire for heating elements in things like toasters and space heaters. These uses make chromium a strategic material. Consequently, during World War II, U.S. road engineers were instructed to avoid chromium in yellow road paint, as it "may become a critical material during the emergency". The United States likewise considered chromium "essential for the German war industry" and made intense diplomatic efforts to keep it out of the hands of Nazi Germany.

The high hardness and corrosion resistance of unalloyed chromium makes it a reliable metal for surface coating; it is still the most popular metal for sheet coating, with its above-average durability, compared to other coating metals. A layer of chromium is deposited on pretreated metallic surfaces by electroplating techniques. There are two deposition methods: thin, and thick. Thin deposition involves a layer of chromium below 1 μm thickness deposited by chrome plating, and is used for decorative surfaces. Thicker chromium layers are deposited if wear-resistant surfaces are needed. Both methods use acidic chromate or dichromate solutions. To prevent the energy-consuming change in oxidation state, the use of chromium(III) sulfate is under development; for most applications of chromium, the previously established process is used.

In the chromate conversion coating process, the strong oxidative properties of chromates are used to deposit a protective oxide layer on metals like aluminium, zinc, and cadmium. This passivation and the self-healing properties of the chromate stored in the chromate conversion coating, which is able to migrate to local defects, are the benefits of this coating method. Because of environmental and health regulations on chromates, alternative coating methods are under development.

Chromic acid anodizing (or Type I anodizing) of aluminium is another electrochemical process that does not lead to the deposition of chromium, but uses chromic acid as an electrolyte in the solution. During anodization, an oxide layer is formed on the aluminium. The use of chromic acid, instead of the normally used sulfuric acid, leads to a slight difference of these oxide layers. The high toxicity of Cr(VI) compounds, used in the established chromium electroplating process, and the strengthening of safety and environmental regulations demand a search for substitutes for chromium, or at least a change to less toxic chromium(III) compounds.

=== Pigment ===
The mineral crocoite (which is also lead chromate PbCrO_{4}) was used as a yellow pigment shortly after its discovery. After a synthesis method became available starting from the more abundant chromite, chrome yellow was, together with cadmium yellow, one of the most used yellow pigments. The pigment does not photodegrade, but it tends to darken due to the formation of chromium(III) oxide. It has a strong color, and was used for school buses in the United States and for the postal services (for example, the Deutsche Post) in Europe. The use of chrome yellow has since declined due to environmental and safety concerns and was replaced by organic pigments or other alternatives that are free from lead and chromium. Other pigments that are based around chromium are, for example, the deep shade of red pigment chrome red, which is simply lead chromate with lead(II) hydroxide (PbCrO_{4}·Pb(OH)_{2}). A very important chromate pigment, which was used widely in metal primer formulations, was zinc chromate, now replaced by zinc phosphate. A wash primer was formulated to replace the dangerous practice of pre-treating aluminium aircraft bodies with a phosphoric acid solution. This used zinc tetroxychromate dispersed in a solution of polyvinyl butyral. An 8% solution of phosphoric acid in solvent was added just before application. It was found that an easily oxidized alcohol was an essential ingredient. A thin layer of about 10–15 μm was applied, which turned from yellow to dark green when it was cured. There is still a question as to the correct mechanism. Chrome green is a mixture of Prussian blue and chrome yellow, while the chrome oxide green is chromium(III) oxide.

Chromium oxides are also used as a green pigment in the field of glassmaking and also as a glaze for ceramics. Green chromium oxide is extremely lightfast and as such is used in cladding coatings. It is also the main ingredient in infrared reflecting paints, used by the armed forces to paint vehicles and to give them the same infrared reflectance as green leaves.

=== Other uses ===
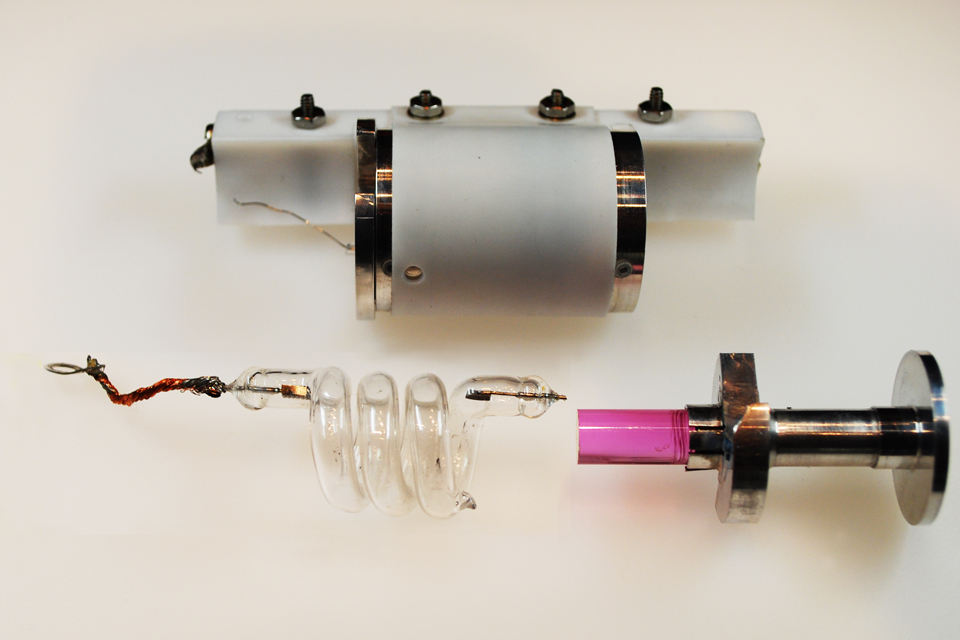
Red crystal of a ruby laser

Chromium(III) ions present in corundum crystals (aluminium oxide) cause them to be colored red; when corundum appears as such, it is known as a ruby. If the corundum is lacking in chromium(III) ions, it is known as a sapphire. (Note: Any color of corundum (disregarding red) is known as a sapphire. If the corundum is red, then it is a ruby. Sapphires are not required to be blue corundum crystals, as sapphires can be other colors such as yellow and purple) A red-colored artificial ruby may also be achieved by doping chromium(III) into artificial corundum crystals, thus making chromium a requirement for making synthetic rubies. (Note: When Cr^{3+} replaces Al^{3+} in corundum (aluminium oxide, Al_{2}O_{3}), pink sapphire or ruby is formed, depending on the amount of chromium.) Such a synthetic ruby crystal was the basis for the first laser, produced in 1960, which relied on stimulated emission of light from the chromium atoms in such a crystal. Ruby has a laser transition at 694.3 nanometers, in a deep red color.

Chromium(VI) salts are used for the preservation of wood. For example, chromated copper arsenate (CCA) is used in timber treatment to protect wood from decay fungi, wood-attacking insects, including termites, and marine borers. The formulations contain chromium based on the oxide CrO_{3} between 35.3% and 65.5%. In the United States, 65,300 metric tons of CCA solution were used in 1996.

Chromium(III) salts, especially chrome alum and chromium(III) sulfate, are used in the tanning of leather. The chromium(III) stabilizes the leather by cross linking the collagen fibers. Chromium tanned leather can contain 4–5% of chromium, which is tightly bound to the proteins. Although the form of chromium used for tanning is not the toxic hexavalent variety, there remains interest in management of chromium in the tanning industry. Recovery and reuse, direct/indirect recycling, and "chrome-less" or "chrome-free" tanning are practiced to better manage chromium usage.

The high heat resistivity and high melting point makes chromite and chromium(III) oxide a material for high temperature refractory applications, like blast furnaces, cement kilns, molds for the firing of bricks and as foundry sands for the casting of metals. In these applications, the refractory materials are made from mixtures of chromite and magnesite. The use is declining because of the environmental regulations due to the possibility of the formation of chromium(VI).

Several chromium compounds are used as catalysts for processing hydrocarbons. For example, the Phillips catalyst, prepared from chromium oxides, is used for the production of about half the world's polyethylene. Fe-Cr mixed oxides are employed as high-temperature catalysts for the water gas shift reaction. Copper chromite is a useful hydrogenation catalyst.

=== Uses of compounds ===
- Chromium(IV) oxide (CrO_{2}) is a magnetic compound. Its ideal shape anisotropy, which imparts high coercivity and remnant magnetization, made it a compound superior to γ−Fe_{2}O_{3}. Chromium(IV) oxide is used to manufacture magnetic tape used in high-performance audio tape and standard audio cassettes.
- Chromium(III) oxide (Cr_{2}O_{3}) is a metal polish known as green rouge.
- Chromic acid is a powerful oxidizing agent and is a useful compound for cleaning laboratory glassware of any trace of organic compounds. It is prepared by dissolving potassium dichromate in concentrated sulfuric acid, which is then used to wash the apparatus. Sodium dichromate is sometimes used because of its higher solubility (50 g/L versus 200 g/L respectively). The use of dichromate cleaning solutions is now phased out due to the high toxicity and environmental concerns. Modern cleaning solutions are highly effective and chromium free.
- Potassium dichromate is a chemical reagent, used as a titrating agent.
- Chromates are added to drilling muds to prevent corrosion of steel under wet conditions.
- Chrome alum is Chromium(III) potassium sulfate and is used as a mordant (i.e., a fixing agent) for dyes in fabric and in tanning.
- Zinc chromate is used as an anticorrosive agent for aluminium, especially in the aerospace industry.

== Biological role ==
The possible nutritional value of chromium(III) is unproven. Although chromium is regarded as a trace element and dietary mineral, its suspected roles in the action of insulin – a hormone that mediates the metabolism and storage of carbohydrate, fat, and protein – have not been adequately established. The mechanism of its actions in the body is undefined, leaving in doubt whether chromium has a biological role in healthy people.

In contrast, hexavalent chromium (Cr(VI) or Cr^{6+}) is highly toxic and mutagenic. Ingestion of chromium(VI) in water has been linked to stomach tumors, and it may also cause allergic contact dermatitis.

"Chromium deficiency", involving a lack of Cr(III) in the body, or perhaps some complex of it, such as glucose tolerance factor, is not accepted as a medical condition, as it has no symptoms and healthy people do not require chromium supplementation. Some studies suggest that the biologically active form of chromium(III) is transported in the body via an oligopeptide called low-molecular-weight chromium-binding substance (chromodulin), which might play a role in the insulin signaling pathway.

The chromium content of common foods is generally low (1–13 micrograms per serving). The chromium content of food varies widely, due to differences in soil mineral content, growing season, plant cultivar, and contamination during processing. Chromium (and nickel) leach into food cooked in stainless steel, with the effect being largest when the cookware is new. Acidic foods that are cooked for many hours also exacerbate this effect.

=== Dietary recommendations ===
There is disagreement on chromium's status as an essential nutrient. Governmental departments from Australia, New Zealand, India, and Japan consider chromium as essential, while the United States and European Food Safety Authority of the European Union do not.

The U.S. National Academy of Medicine (NAM) updated the Estimated Average Requirements (EARs) and the Recommended Dietary Allowances (RDAs) for chromium in 2001. For chromium, there was insufficient information to set EARs and RDAs, so its needs are described as estimates for Adequate Intake (AI). From a 2001 assessment, AI of chromium for women ages 14 through 50 is 25 μg/day, and the AI for women ages 50 and above is 20 μg/day. The AIs for women who are pregnant are 30 μg/day, and for women who are lactating, the set AI is 45 μg/day. The AI for men ages 14 through 50 is 35 μg/day, and the AI for men ages 50 and above is 30 μg/day. For children ages 1 through 13, the AI increases with age from 0.2 μg/day up to 25 μg/day. As for safety, the NAM sets Tolerable Upper Intake Levels (ULs) for vitamins and minerals when the evidence is sufficient. In the case of chromium, there is not yet enough information, hence no UL has been established. Collectively, the EARs, RDAs, AIs, and ULs are the parameters for the nutrition recommendation system known as Dietary Reference Intake (DRI).

Australia and New Zealand consider chromium to be an essential nutrient, with an AI of 35 μg/day for men, 25 μg/day for women, 30 μg/day for women who are pregnant, and 45 μg/day for women who are lactating. A UL has not been set due to the lack of sufficient data. India considers chromium to be an essential nutrient, with an adult recommended intake of 33 μg/day. Japan also considers chromium to be an essential nutrient, with an AI of 10 μg/day for adults, including women who are pregnant or lactating. A UL has not been set.

The EFSA does not consider chromium to be an essential nutrient.

==== Labeling ====
For U.S. food and dietary supplement labeling purposes, the amount of the substance in a serving is expressed as a percent of the Daily Value (%DV). For chromium labeling purposes, 100% of the Daily Value was 120 μg. As of 27 May 2016, the percentage of daily value was revised to 35 μg to bring the chromium intake into a consensus with the official Recommended Dietary Allowance. A table of the old and new adult daily values in the United States is provided at Reference Daily Intake.

After evaluation of research on the potential nutritional value of chromium, the European Food Safety Authority concluded that there was no evidence of benefit by dietary chromium in healthy people, thereby declining to establish recommendations in Europe for dietary intake of chromium.

=== Food sources ===
Food composition databases such as those maintained by the U.S. Department of Agriculture do not contain information on the chromium content of foods. A wide variety of animal and vegetable foods contain chromium. Content per serving is influenced by the chromium content of the soil in which the plants are grown, by foodstuffs fed to animals, and by processing methods, as chromium is leached into foods if processed or cooked in stainless steel equipment. One diet analysis study conducted in Mexico reported an average daily chromium intake of 30 micrograms. An estimated 31% of adults in the United States consume multi-vitamin/mineral dietary supplements, which often contain 25 to 60 micrograms of chromium.

=== Supplementation ===
Chromium is an ingredient in total parenteral nutrition (TPN), because deficiency can occur after months of intravenous feeding with chromium-free TPN. It is also added to nutritional products for preterm infants. Although the mechanism of action in biological roles for chromium is unclear, in the United States chromium-containing products are sold as non-prescription dietary supplements in amounts ranging from 50 to 1,000 μg. Lower amounts of chromium are also often incorporated into multi-vitamin/mineral supplements consumed by an estimated 31% of adults in the United States. Chemical compounds used in dietary supplements include chromium chloride, chromium citrate, chromium(III) picolinate, chromium(III) polynicotinate, and other chemical compositions. The benefit of supplements has not been proven.

==== Initiation of research on glucose ====
The notion of chromium as a potential regulator of glucose metabolism began in the 1950s when scientists performed a series of experiments controlling the diet of rats. The experimenters subjected the rats to a chromium deficient diet, and witnessed an inability to respond effectively to increased levels of blood glucose. A chromium-rich Brewer's yeast was provided in the diet, enabling the rats to effectively metabolize glucose, and so giving evidence that chromium may have a role in glucose management.

=== Approved and disapproved health claims ===
In 2005, the U.S. Food and Drug Administration had approved a qualified health claim for chromium picolinate with a requirement for specific label wording:

"One small study suggests that chromium picolinate may reduce the risk of insulin resistance, and therefore possibly may reduce the risk of type 2 diabetes. FDA concludes, however, that the existence of such a relationship between chromium picolinate and either insulin resistance or type 2 diabetes is highly uncertain."

In other parts of the petition, the FDA rejected claims for chromium picolinate and cardiovascular disease, retinopathy or kidney disease caused by abnormally high blood sugar levels. As of March 2024, this ruling on chromium remains in effect.

In 2010, chromium(III) picolinate was approved by Health Canada to be used in dietary supplements. Approved labeling statements include: a factor in the maintenance of good health, provides support for healthy glucose metabolism, helps the body to metabolize carbohydrates and helps the body to metabolize fats. The European Food Safety Authority approved claims in 2010 that chromium contributed to normal macronutrient metabolism and maintenance of normal blood glucose concentration, but rejected claims for maintenance or achievement of a normal body weight, or reduction of tiredness or fatigue.

However, in a 2014 reassessment of studies to determine whether a Dietary Reference Intake value could be established for chromium, EFSA stated:

"The Panel concludes that no Average Requirement and no Population Reference Intake for chromium for the performance of physiological functions can be defined." and

"The Panel considered that there is no evidence of beneficial effects associated with chromium intake in healthy subjects. The Panel concludes that the setting of an Adequate Intake for chromium is also not appropriate."

==== Diabetes ====
Given the evidence for chromium deficiency causing problems with glucose management in the context of intravenous nutrition products formulated without chromium, research interest turned to whether chromium supplementation would benefit people who have type 2 diabetes but are not chromium deficient. Looking at the results from four meta-analyses, one reported a statistically significant decrease in fasting plasma glucose levels and a non-significant trend in lower hemoglobin A1C. A second reported the same, a third reported significant decreases for both measures, while a fourth reported no benefit for either. A review published in 2016 listed 53 randomized clinical trials that were included in one or more of six meta-analyses. It concluded that whereas there may be modest decreases in fasting blood glucose and/or HbA1C that achieve statistical significance in some of these meta-analyses, few of the trials achieved decreases large enough to be expected to be relevant to clinical outcome.

==== Body weight ====
Two systematic reviews looked at chromium supplements as a mean of managing body weight in overweight and obese people. One, limited to chromium picolinate, a common supplement ingredient, reported a statistically significant −1.1 kg (2.4 lb) weight loss in trials longer than 12 weeks. The other included all chromium compounds and reported a statistically significant −0.50 kg (1.1 lb) weight change. Change in percent body fat did not reach statistical significance. Authors of both reviews considered the clinical relevance of this modest weight loss as uncertain/unreliable. The European Food Safety Authority reviewed the literature and concluded that there was insufficient evidence to support a claim.

==== Sports ====
Chromium is promoted as a sports performance dietary supplement, based on the theory that it potentiates insulin activity, with anticipated results of increased muscle mass, and faster recovery of glycogen storage during post-exercise recovery. A review of clinical trials reported that chromium supplementation did not improve exercise performance or increase muscle strength. The International Olympic Committee reviewed dietary supplements for high-performance athletes in 2018 and concluded there was no need to increase chromium intake for athletes, nor support for claims of losing body fat.

=== Fresh-water fish ===
Irrigation water standards for chromium are 0.1 mg/L, but some rivers in Bangladesh are more than five times that amount. The standard for fish for human consumption is less than 1 mg/kg, but many tested samples were more than five times that amount. Chromium, especially hexavalent chromium, is highly toxic to fish because it is easily absorbed across the gills, readily enters blood circulation, crosses cell membranes and bioconcentrates up the food chain. In contrast, the toxicity of trivalent chromium is very low, attributed to poor membrane permeability and little biomagnification.

Acute and chronic exposure to chromium(VI) affects fish behavior, physiology, reproduction and survival. Hyperactivity and erratic swimming have been reported in contaminated environments. Egg hatching and fingerling survival are affected. In adult fish there are reports of histopathological damage to liver, kidney, muscle, intestines, and gills. Mechanisms include mutagenic gene damage and disruptions of enzyme functions.

There is evidence that fish may not require chromium, but benefit from a measured amount in diet. In one study, juvenile fish gained weight on a zero chromium diet, but the addition of 500 μg of chromium in the form of chromium chloride or other supplement types, per kilogram of food (dry weight), increased weight gain. At 2,000 μg/kg the weight gain was no better than with the zero chromium diet, and there were increased DNA strand breaks.

== Precautions ==
Water-insoluble chromium(III) compounds and chromium metal are not considered a health hazard, while the toxicity and carcinogenic properties of chromium(VI) have been known for a long time. Because of the specific transport mechanisms, only limited amounts of chromium(III) enter the cells. Acute oral toxicity ranges between 50 and 150 mg/kg. A 2008 review suggested that moderate uptake of chromium(III) through dietary supplements poses no genetic-toxic risk. In the US, the Occupational Safety and Health Administration (OSHA) has designated an air permissible exposure limit (PEL) in the workplace as a time-weighted average (TWA) of 1 mg/m^{3}. The National Institute for Occupational Safety and Health (NIOSH) has set a recommended exposure limit (REL) of 0.5 mg/m^{3}, time-weighted average. The IDLH (immediately dangerous to life and health) value is 250 mg/m^{3}.

=== Chromium(VI) toxicity ===
The acute oral toxicity for chromium(VI) ranges between 1.5 and 3.3 mg/kg. In the body, chromium(VI) is reduced by several mechanisms to chromium(III) already in the blood before it enters the cells. The chromium(III) is excreted from the body, whereas the chromate ion is transferred into the cell by a transport mechanism, by which also sulfate and phosphate ions enter the cell. The acute toxicity of chromium(VI) is due to its strong oxidant properties. After it reaches the blood stream, it damages the kidneys, the liver and blood cells through oxidation reactions. Hemolysis, renal, and liver failure result. Aggressive dialysis can be therapeutic.

The carcinogenity of chromate dust has been known for a long time, and in 1890 the first publication described the elevated cancer risk of workers in a chromate dye company. Three mechanisms have been proposed to describe the genotoxicity of chromium(VI). The first mechanism includes highly reactive hydroxyl radicals and other reactive radicals which are by products of the reduction of chromium(VI) to chromium(III). The second process includes the direct binding of chromium(V), produced by reduction in the cell, and chromium(IV) compounds to the DNA. The last mechanism attributed the genotoxicity to the binding to the DNA of the end product of the chromium(III) reduction.

Chromium salts (chromates) are also the cause of allergic reactions in some people. Chromates are often used to manufacture, amongst other things, leather products, paints, cement, mortar and anti-corrosives. Contact with products containing chromates can lead to allergic contact dermatitis and irritant dermatitis, resulting in ulceration of the skin, sometimes referred to as "chrome ulcers". This condition is often found in workers that have been exposed to strong chromate solutions in electroplating, tanning and chrome-producing manufacturers.

=== Environmental issues ===
Because chromium compounds were used in dyes, paints, and leather tanning compounds, these compounds are often found in soil and groundwater at active and abandoned industrial sites, needing environmental cleanup and remediation. Primer paint containing hexavalent chromium is still widely used for aerospace and automobile refinishing applications.

In 2010, the Environmental Working Group studied the drinking water in 35 American cities in the first nationwide study. The study found measurable hexavalent chromium in the tap water of 31 of the cities sampled, with Norman, Oklahoma, at the top of list; 25 cities had levels that exceeded California's proposed limit.

The more toxic hexavalent chromium form can be reduced to the less soluble trivalent oxidation state in soils by organic matter, ferrous iron, sulfides, and other reducing agents, with the rates of such reduction being faster under more acidic conditions than under more alkaline ones. In contrast, trivalent chromium can be oxidized to hexavalent chromium in soils by manganese oxides, such as Mn(III) and Mn(IV) compounds. Since the solubility and toxicity of chromium(VI) are greater than those of chromium(III), the oxidation-reduction conversions between the two oxidation states have implications for movement and bioavailability of chromium in soils, groundwater, and plants.

== General bibliography ==
- Greenwood, Norman N.; Earnshaw, Alan (1997). Chemistry of the Elements (2nd ed.). Butterworth-Heinemann. doi:10.1016/C2009-0-30414-6. ISBN 978-0-08-037941-8.
