= Chromium deficiency =

Deficiency in intravenous nutrition patients

- Chromium
- Specialty: Endocrinology

Chromium deficiency is described as the consequence of an insufficient dietary intake of the mineral chromium. Chromium was first proposed as an essential element for normal glucose metabolism in 1959, but its biological function has not been identified. Cases of deficiency were described in people who received all of their nutrition intravenously for long periods of time.

The essentiality of chromium has been challenged. Whereas the authorities in the European Union do not recognize chromium as an essential nutrient, those in the United States do, and identify an adequate intake for adults as between 25 and 45 μg/day, depending on age and sex. Dietary supplements containing chromium are widely available in the United States, with claims for benefits for fasting plasma glucose, hemoglobin A1C and weight loss. Reviews report the changes as modest, and without scientific consensus that the changes have a clinically relevant impact.

== Signs and symptoms ==
The claimed symptoms of chromium deficiency caused by long-term total parenteral nutrition are severely impaired glucose tolerance, weight loss, peripheral neuropathy and confusion.

== Diagnosis ==
According to the Dietary Reference Intake review, neither plasma nor urine concentrations can serve as useful clinical indicators of chromium status. Before chromium became a standard ingredient in total parenteral nutrition (TPN), people receiving TPN as their sole source of nutrition developed symptoms that were reversed within two weeks of chromium being added.

== Dietary recommendations ==
The U.S. Institute of Medicine (IOM) updated Estimated Average Requirements (EARs) and Recommended Dietary Allowances (RDAs) for chromium in 2001. For chromium, there was not sufficient information to set EARs and RDAs, so needs are described as estimates for Adequate Intakes (AIs). The current AIs for chromium for women are 25 μg/day for women ages 14–50 and 20 μg/day for older women. AI for pregnancy is 30 μg/day. AI for lactation is 45 μg/day. AI for men is 35 μg/day for ages 14–50 and 30 μg/day for older. For infants to children ages 1–13 years, the AI increases with age from 0.2 to 25 μg/day. As for safety, the IOM sets Tolerable upper intake levels (ULs) for vitamins and minerals when evidence is sufficient. In the case of chromium, there is not yet enough information and hence no UL. Collectively the EARs, RDAs, AIs and ULs are referred to as Dietary Reference Intakes (DRIs).

Japan designates chromium as an essential nutrient, identifying 10 μg/day as an adequate intake for adults.

The European Food Safety Authority (EFSA) refers to the collective set of information as Dietary Reference Values, with Population Reference Intake (PRI) instead of RDA, and Average Requirement instead of EAR. AI and UL are defined the same as in the United States. The EFSA does not consider chromium to be an essential nutrient, and so has not set PRIs, AIs or ULs. Chromium is the only mineral for which the United States and the European Union disagree on essentiality.

For U.S. food and dietary supplement labeling purposes, the amount in a serving is expressed as a percent of Daily Value (%DV). For chromium labeling purposes, 100% of the Daily Value was 120 μg, but as of 27 May 2016, it was revised to 35 μg to bring it into agreement with the RDA. Compliance with the updated labeling regulations was required by 1 January 2020, for manufacturers with $10 million or more in annual food sales, and by 1 January 2021 for manufacturers with less than $10 million in annual food sales. During the first six months following the 1 January 2020 compliance date, the FDA plans to work cooperatively with manufacturers to meet the new Nutrition Facts label requirements and will not focus on enforcement actions regarding these requirements during that time. A table of the old and new adult Daily Values is provided at Reference Daily Intake.

=== Sources ===
Approximately 2% of ingested chromium(III) is absorbed, with the remainder being excreted in the feces. Amino acids, vitamin C and niacin may enhance the uptake of chromium from the intestinal tract. After absorption, this metal accumulates in the liver, bone, and spleen. Trivalent chromium is found in a wide range of foods, including whole-grain products, processed meats, high-bran breakfast cereals, coffee, nuts, green beans, broccoli, spices, and some brands of wine and beer. Most fruits and vegetables and dairy products contain only low amounts.

== Diabetes ==
Little strong evidence exists that chromium supplementation benefits people who have type 2 diabetes. One meta-analysis reported a statistically significant decrease in fasting plasma glucose levels (FPG) and a non-significant trend in lower hemoglobin A1C (HbA1C). A second reported the same, a third reported significant decreases for both measures, while a fourth reported no benefit for either. A review published in 2016 listed 53 randomized clinical trials that were included in one or more of six meta-analyses. It concluded that whereas there may be modest decreases in FPG and/or HbA1C that achieve statistical significance in some of these meta-analyses, few of the trials achieved decreases large enough to be expected to be relevant to clinical outcome. The authors also mentioned that trial design was for chromium as an addition to standard glycemic control medications, and so did not evaluate chromium as a first treatment for type 2 diabetes, or for prevention of progression from pre-diabetes to diabetes. The conclusion was that "...there is still little reason to recommend chromium dietary supplements to achieve clinically meaningful improvements in glycemic control." The American Diabetes Association publishes a standards of care review every year. The 2018 review makes no mention of chromium supplementation as a possible treatment.

== Supplementation ==
Chromium supplementation in general is subject to a certain amount of controversy as it is by no means clear that chromium is an essential element in human biology. Nevertheless, chromium is an ingredient in total parenteral nutrition, along with other trace minerals. It is also in nutritional products for preterm infants. Many chromium-containing products, including chromium chloride, chromium citrate, chromium(III) picolinate, chromium(III) polynicotinate are sold as non-prescription dietary supplements.

=== Government-approved health claims ===
In 2005, the U.S. Food and Drug Administration approved a Qualified Health Claim for chromium picolinate with a requirement for very specific label wording: "One small study suggests that chromium picolinate may reduce the risk of insulin resistance, and therefore possibly may reduce the risk of type 2 diabetes. FDA concludes, however, that the existence of such a relationship between chromium picolinate and either insulin resistance or type 2 diabetes is highly uncertain." In 2010, chromium(III) picolinate was approved by Health Canada to be used in dietary supplements. Approved labeling statements included: "...provides support for healthy glucose metabolism." The European Food Safety Authority (EFSA) approved claims in 2010 that chromium contributed to normal macronutrient metabolism and maintenance of normal blood glucose concentration.

== See also ==
- Chromium toxicity
