= Chrome alum =

Potassium chromium sulfate
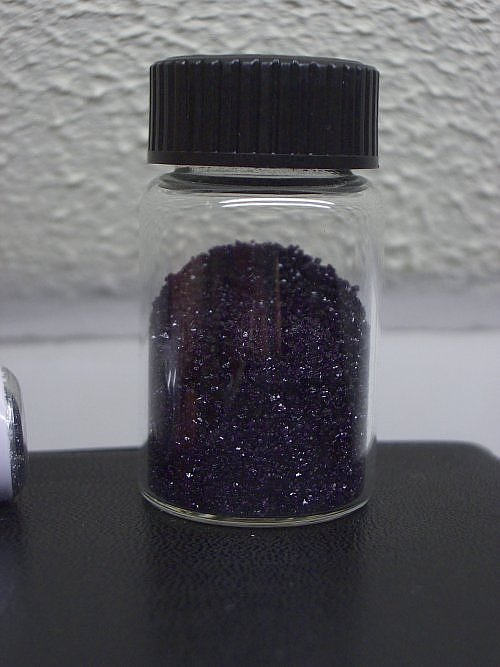
- Sample of chrome alum in sample jar

Names
- IUPAC name Chromium potassium sulfate
- Other names Chromium alum

Identifiers
CAS Number	10141-00-1
3D model (JSmol)	Interactive image
ChemSpider	19968602
ECHA InfoCard	100.030.352
EC Number	233-401-6
MeSH	chrome+alum
PubChem CID	61489
RTECS number	GB6845000
UNII	579U79PAIC
CompTox Dashboard (EPA)	DTXSID00890645
- InChI: InChI=1S/Cr.K.2H2O4S/c;;2*1-5(2,3)4/h;;2*(H2,1,2,3,4)/q+3;+1;;/p-4 Key: OIDPCXKPHYRNKH-UHFFFAOYSA-J; InChI=1/Cr.K.2H2O4S/c;;2*1-5(2,3)4/h;;2*(H2,1,2,3,4)/q+2;+1;;/p-4 Key: HIZQQXDAMAATMK-XBHQNQODAZ
- SMILES: [K]OS(=O)(=O)O[Cr]1OS(=O)(=O)O1

Properties
Chemical formula	KCr(SO_{4})_{2}
Molar mass	283.220 g/mol
Appearance	dark purple needles or greyish-brown powder when anhydrous
Density	1.83 g cm^{−3}
Melting point	89 °C (192 °F; 362 K)
Boiling point	400 °C (752 °F; 673 K)
Solubility in water	24 g/100mL (at 20 °C)

Hazards
- GHS labelling
Pictograms	(GHS07: Exclamation mark)
Signal word	Warning
Hazard statements	H315, H319
Precautionary statements	P305+P351+P338

Structure
Crystal structure	cubic
- Except where otherwise noted, data are given for materials in their standard state (at 25 °C [77 °F], 100 kPa). Infobox references

Chrome alum or chromium(III) potassium sulfate is the potassium double sulfate of chromium. Its chemical formula is KCr(SO_{4})_{2} and it is commonly found in its dodecahydrate form as KCr(SO_{4})_{2}·12(H_{2}O). It is used in leather tanning.

== Production and properties ==
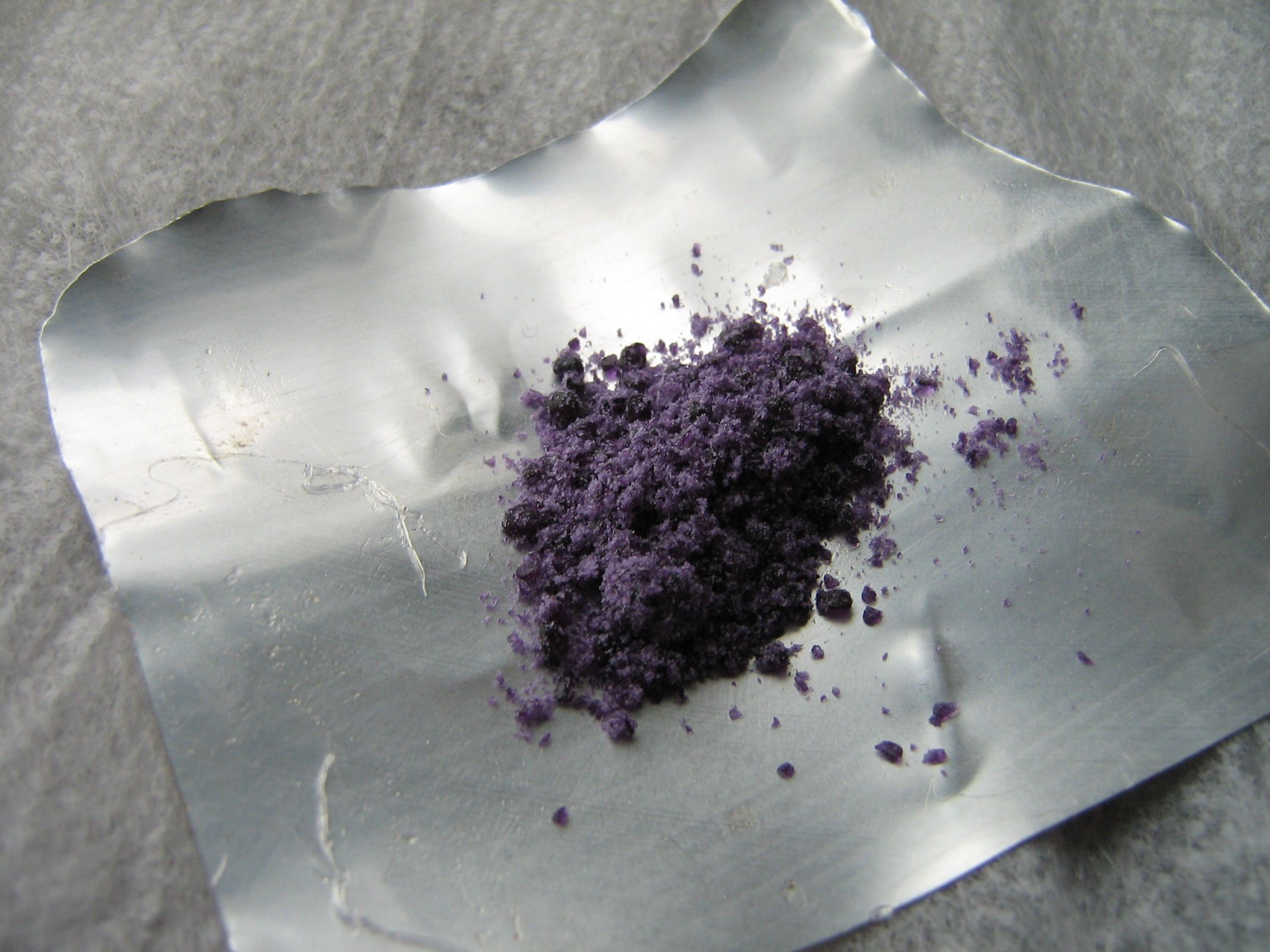
Chrome alum

Chromium alum is produced from chromate salts or from ferrochromium alloys. Concentrated aqueous solutions of potassium dichromate can be reduced, usually with sulfur dioxide but also with alcohols or formaldehyde, in the presence of sulfuric acid at temperatures <40 °C. Alternatively and less commonly, ferrochromium alloys can be dissolved in sulfuric acid and, after precipitation of the ferrous sulfate, the chrome alum crystallizes upon addition of potassium sulfate. Chromium alum crystallizes in regular octahedra with flattened corners and is very soluble in water. The solution reddens litmus and is an astringent. Aqueous solutions are dark violet and turns green when it is heated above 50 °C. In addition to the dodecahydrate, the hexahydrate KCr(SO_{4})_{2}·6H_{2}O, dihydrate KCr(SO_{4})_{2}·2H_{2}O, and the monohydrate KCr(SO_{4})_{2}·H_{2}O are known.

== Uses ==
Chromium alum is used in the tanning of leather as chromium(III) stabilizes the leather by cross linking the collagen fibers within the leather. However, this application is obsolete because the simpler chromium(III) sulfate is preferred.

It was also used in gelatine emulsions in photographic film as hardener.
