= Low-molecular-weight chromium-binding substance =

Low-molecular-weight chromium-binding substance (LMWCr; also known as chromodulin) is an oligopeptide that seems to transport chromium in the body. It consists of four amino acid residues; aspartate, cysteine, glutamate, and glycine, bonded with four (Cr^{3+}) centers. It interacts with the insulin receptor, by prolonging kinase activity through stimulating the tyrosine kinase pathway, thus leading to improved glucose absorption. and has been confused with glucose tolerance factor.

As of 2015, the exact mechanisms underlying this process were still unknown. Evidence for the existence of this protein comes from the fact that the removal of ^{51}Cr in the blood exceeds the rate of ^{51}Cr formation in the urine. This indicates that the transport of Cr^{3+} must involve an intermediate (i.e. chromodulin) and that Cr^{3+} is moved from the blood to tissues in response to increased levels of insulin. Subsequent protein isolations in rats, dogs, mice and cows have shown the presence of a similar substance, suggesting that it is found extensively in mammals. This oligopeptide is small, having a molecular weight of around 1 500 g/mol and the predominant amino acids present are aspartic acid, glutamic acid, glycine, and cysteine. Despite recent efforts to characterize the exact structure of chromodulin, it is still relatively unknown.

== Nature of binding ==
From spectroscopic data, it has been shown that Cr^{3+} binds tightly to chromodulin (K_{f} = 10^{21} M^{−4}), and that the binding is highly cooperative (Hill Coefficient = 3.47). It has been shown that holochromodulin binds 4 equivalents of Cr^{3+}. Evidence for this comes from in vitro studies which showed that apochromodulin exerts its maximal activity on insulin receptors when titrated with 4 equivalents of Cr^{3+}. Chromodulin is highly specific for Cr^{3+} as no other metals are able to stimulate tyrosine kinase activity. It is believed to stimulate the phosphorylation of the 3 tyrosine residues of the β subunits of the insulin receptor. From electronic studies, the crystal field stabilization energy was determined to be 1.74 × 10^{3} while the Racah parameter B was 847 cm^{−1}. This indicates that chromium binds to chromodulin in the trivalent form. In addition, magnetic susceptibility studies have shown that chromium does not coordinate to any N-terminal amine groups but rather to carboxylates (although the exact amino acids involved are still unknown). These magnetic susceptibility studies are consistent with the presence of a mononuclear Cr^{3+} center and an unsymmetric trinuclear Cr^{3+} assembly with bridging oxo ligands. In chromodulin isolated from bovine liver, x-ray absorption spectroscopy studies have shown that the chromium (III) atoms are surrounded by 6 oxygen atoms with an average Cr—O distance of 1.98 Å, while the distance between 2 chromium (III) atoms is 2.79 Å. These results are indicative of a multinuclear assembly. No sulfur ligands coordinate to chromium and instead, it has been proposed that a disulfide linkage between 2 cysteine residues occurs owing to a characteristic peak at 260 nm.
