= Chromium(III) sulfate =

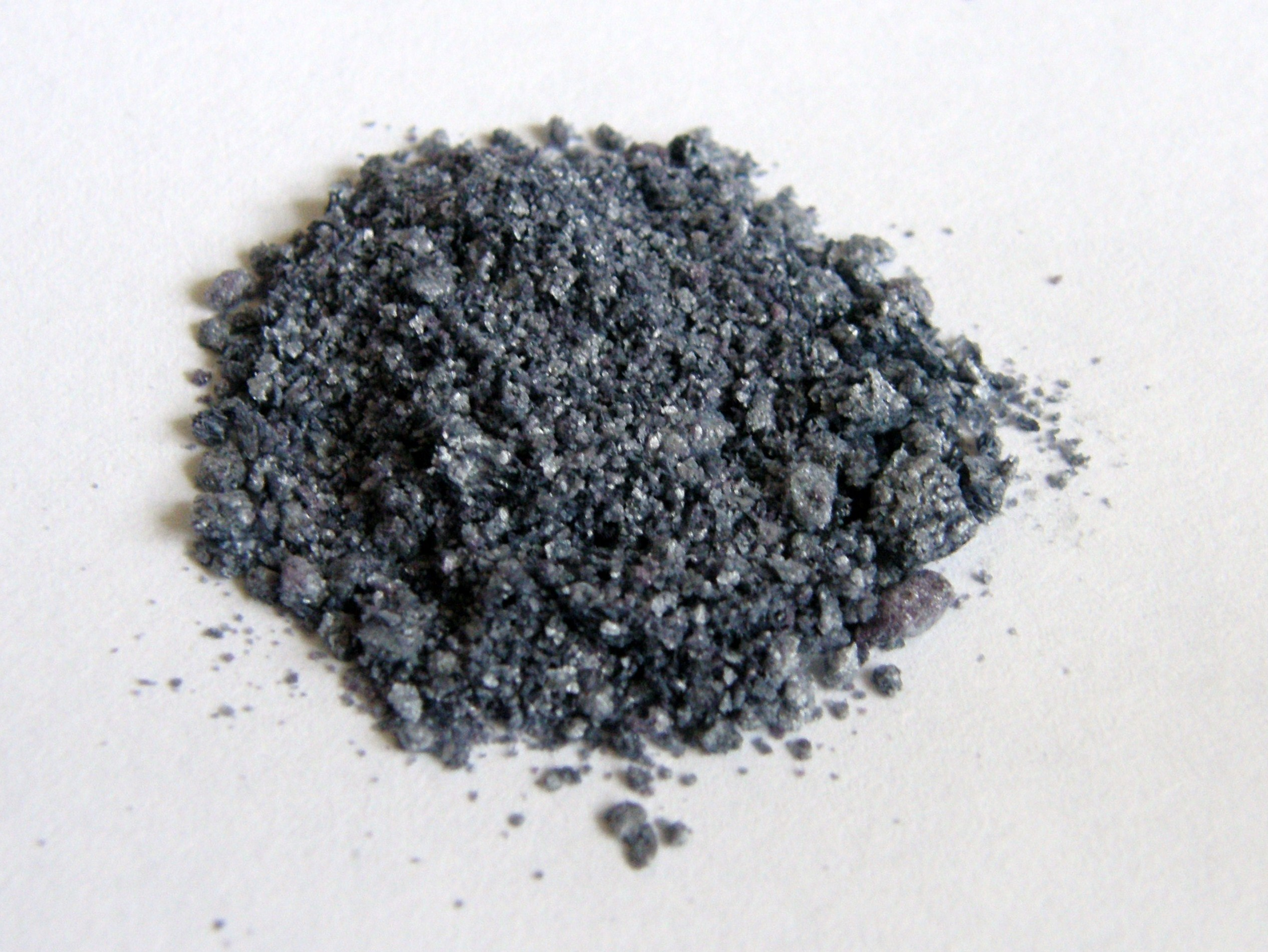

Names
- IUPAC name Chromium(III) sulfate
- Other names Basic chromium sulfate, chromic sulfate

Identifiers
CAS Number	10101-53-8; 15244-38-9 (decahydrate); 10031-37-5 (pentadecahydrate); 13520-66-6 (octadecahydrate)
3D model (JSmol)	anhydrous: Interactive image; dodecahydrate: Interactive image
ChEBI	CHEBI:53471
ChemSpider	23304
ECHA InfoCard	100.030.217
EC Number	233-253-2
PubChem CID	24930
UNII	Y0C99N5TMZ; 8Q759N78CX (decahydrate); E4T8TU3LE8 (pentadecahydrate)
UN number	2240 3077
CompTox Dashboard (EPA)	DTXSID20890642
- InChI: InChI=1S/2Cr.3H2O4S.12H2O/c;;3*1-5(2,3)4;;;;;;;;;;;;/h;;3*(H2,1,2,3,4);12*1H2/q2*+3;;;;;;;;;;;;;;;/p-6 Key: ANNXSSGQVXBUEI-UHFFFAOYSA-H; InChI=1/2Cr.3H2O4S.12H2O/c;;3*1-5(2,3)4;;;;;;;;;;;;/h;;3*(H2,1,2,3,4);12*1H2/q2*+3;;;;;;;;;;;;;;;/p-6 Key: ANNXSSGQVXBUEI-CYFPFDDLAL
- SMILES: anhydrous: [Cr+3].[Cr+3].[O-]S(=O)(=O)[O-].[O-]S([O-])(=O)=O.[O-]S([O-])(=O)=O; dodecahydrate: [OH2+][Cr-3]([OH2+])([OH2+])([OH2+])([OH2+])[OH2+].[OH2+][Cr-3]([OH2+])([OH2+])([OH2+])([OH2+])[OH2+].[O-]S(=O)(=O)[O-].[O-]S([O-])(=O)=O.[O-]S([O-])(=O)=O

Properties
Chemical formula	Cr_{2}(SO_{4})_{3}·12H_{2}O
Molar mass	392.16 g/mol 608.363 g/mol (dodecahydrate) 716.45 g/mol (octadecahydrate)
Appearance	reddish-brown crystals (anhydrous), purple crystals (hydrated)
Density	3.10 g/cm^{3} (anhydrous); 1.86 g/cm^{3} (pentadecahydrate); 1.709 g/cm^{3} (octadecahydrate)
Melting point	90 °C
Boiling point	>700 °C (decomposes to chromic acid)
Solubility in water	insoluble (anhydrous) soluble (hydrated)
Solubility	soluble in alcohol practically insoluble in acid
Magnetic susceptibility (χ)	+11,800·10^{−6} cm^{3}/mol

Hazards
- GHS labelling
Pictograms	(GHS05: Corrosive) (GHS07: Exclamation mark) (GHS08: Health hazard) (GHS09: Environmental hazard)
Signal word	Warning
Hazard statements	H314, H317, H332, H334, H335, H340, H350, H373, H412
Precautionary statements	P201, P202, P260, P264, P271, P272, P273, P280, P281, P285, P301+P330+P331, P302+P352, P303+P361+P353, P304+P312, P304+P340, P304+P341, P305+P351+P338, P308+P313, P310, P312, P314, P321, P333+P313, P342+P311, P363, P403+P233, P405, P501
NFPA 704 (fire diamond)	1 0 0
Flash point	Non-flammable
- NIOSH (US health exposure limits)
PEL (Permissible)	TWA 1 mg/m^{3}
REL (Recommended)	TWA 0.5 mg/m^{3}
IDLH (Immediate danger)	250 mg/m^{3}
Safety data sheet (SDS)	MSDS

Related compounds
Other cations	Aluminium sulfate
Related double salts	Chrome alum
- Except where otherwise noted, data are given for materials in their standard state (at 25 °C [77 °F], 100 kPa). verify (what is ?) Infobox references

Chromium(III) sulfate usually refers to the inorganic compounds with the formula Cr_{2}(SO_{4})_{3}·xH_{2}O, where x can range from 0 to 18. Additionally, ill-defined but commercially important "basic chromium sulfates" are known. These salts are usually either violet or green solids that are soluble in water. It is commonly used in tanning leather.

== Chromium(III) sulfates ==
Three chromium(III) sulfates are well characterized:

- Anhydrous chromium(III) sulfate, Cr_{2}(SO_{4})_{3}, (CAS #10101-53-8) is a violet solid that dissolves in water upon addition of a reducing agent. It is isostructural with anhydrous aluminum sulfate.
- Hydrated chromium(III) sulfate, Cr_{2}(SO_{4})_{3}·18H_{2}O, (CAS #13520-66-6) is a violet solid that readily dissolves in water to give the metal aquo complex, [Cr(H_{2}O)_{6}]^{3+}. The formula of this compound can be written more descriptively as [Cr(H_{2}O)_{6}]_{2}(SO_{4})_{3}·6H_{2}O. Six of the eighteen water molecules in this formula unit are water of crystallization.
- Hydrated chromium(III) sulfate, Cr_{2}(SO_{4})_{3}·15H_{2}O, (CAS #10031-37-5) is a green solid that also readily dissolves in water. It is obtained by heating the 18-hydrate material above 70 °C. Further heating yields the anhydrous sulfate.

A variety of other chromium(III) sulfates are known, but also contain hydroxide or oxide ligands. Most important commercially is basic chromium sulfate, which is thought to be [Cr_{2}(H_{2}O)_{6}(OH)_{4}]SO_{4} (CAS#39380-78-4). It results from the partial neutralization of the hexahydrates. Other chromium(III) hydroxides have been reported.

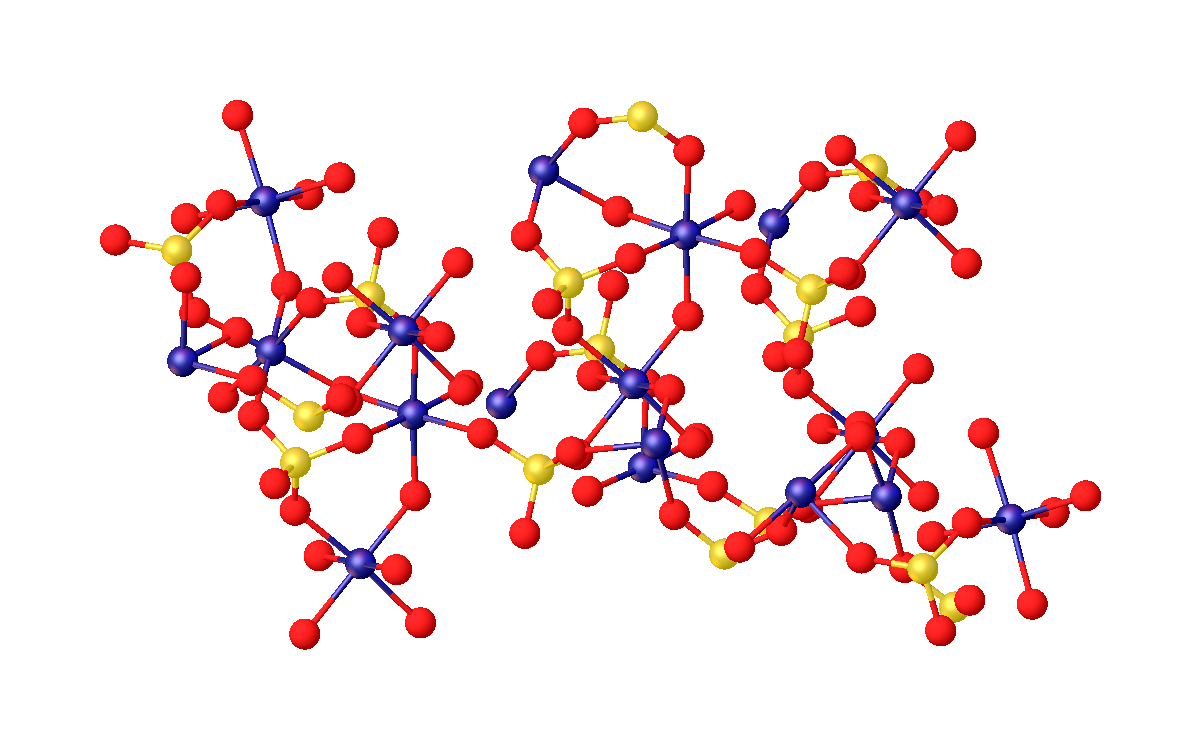
Structure of solid Cr(SO_{4})(H_{2}O)(OH), showing the CrO_{6} coordination sphere typical of many chromium(III) compounds. Color code: red = O, yellow = S, dark blue = Cr.

== Production ==
Chromium(III) sulfates are commonly obtained from the wastes of chromate oxidations of various organic compounds. Anthraquinone and quinone are produced on large scale by the x treatment of respectively anthracene and phenol with chromic acid. A chromium(III) oxide byproduct is generated, which is readily extracted into sulfuric acid. Evaporation of these acidic solutions affords salts if hydrate chromium(III) sulfate. Extraction of chromite ore with sulfuric acid in the presence of some chromate gives solutions of chromium(III) sulfate contaminated with other metal ions. Similarly, dissolution of chrome alloys gives chromium(III) sulfate together with ferrous sulfate.

=== Basic chromium(III) sulfate ===
Basic chromium sulfate is produced from chromate salts by reduction with sulfur dioxide, although other methods exist. The reduction could formally be written:

Na_{2}Cr_{2}O_{7} + 3 SO_{2} + H_{2}O → 2 Cr(OH)(SO_{4}) + Na_{2}SO_{4}

Since 33% of the anion charges are due to hydroxide ions, the basicity is 33% (but in tanning jargon it is known as 33% reduced). Products with higher basicities, e.g. 42% or 50% may be obtained by the addition of sodium carbonate, these are often used in combination with sodium formate. The sodium sulfate is often left in the technical product since it is inert with respect to the tanning process.

== Natural occurrence ==
Three complex minerals that are in part Cr(III) sulfates: bentorite, reddingtonite, and putnisite.
