= Chromium(III) picolinate =

- Skeletal formula of chromium(III) picolinate

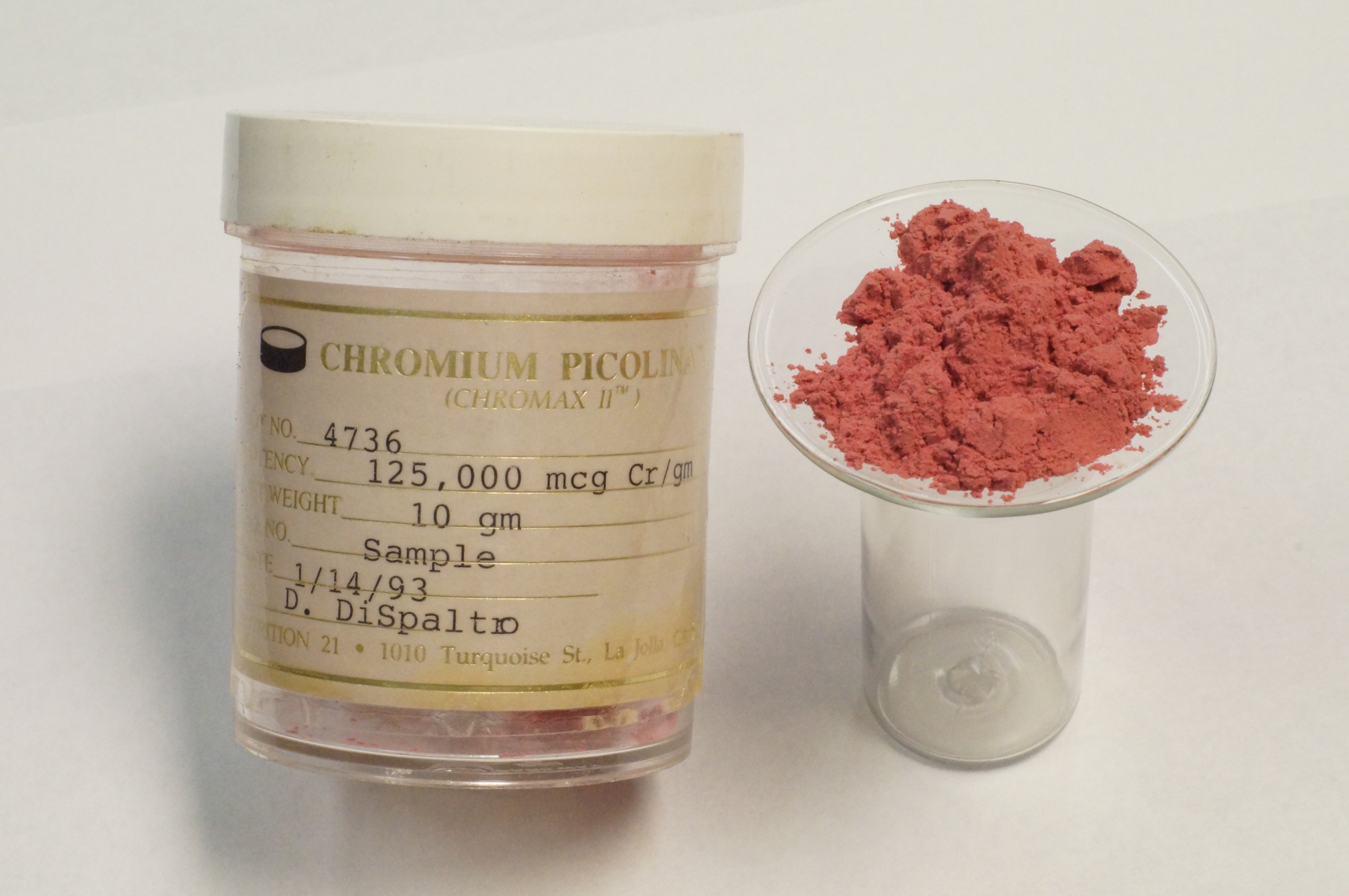
- Watch glass with two grams of chromium(III) picolinate

Names
- IUPAC name Tris(picolinate)chromium(III)

Identifiers
CAS Number	14639-25-9
3D model (JSmol)	ionic form: Interactive image; coordination form: Interactive image
ChEBI	CHEBI:50369
ChemSpider	133913
ECHA InfoCard	100.131.423
PubChem CID	151932
UNII	S71T8B8Z6P
CompTox Dashboard (EPA)	DTXSID1024831
- InChI: InChI=1S/3C6H5NO2.Cr/c3*8-6(9)5-3-1-2-4-7-5;/h3*1-4H,(H,8,9);/q;;;+3/p-3 Key: CBDQOLKNTOMMTL-UHFFFAOYSA-K; InChI=1/3C6H5NO2.Cr/c3*8-6(9)5-3-1-2-4-7-5;/h3*1-4H,(H,8,9);/q;;;+3/p-3 Key: CBDQOLKNTOMMTL-DFZHHIFOAM
- SMILES: ionic form: c1ccnc(c1)C(=O)[O-].c1ccnc(c1)C(=O)[O-].c1ccnc(c1)C(=O)[O-].[Cr+3]; coordination form: c0ccc[n+]1c0C(=O)O[Cr-3]123(OC(=O)c0[n+]2cccc0)OC(=O)c0[n+]3cccc0

Properties
Chemical formula	C_{18}H_{12}CrN_{3}O_{6}
Molar mass	418.305 g·mol^{−1}

Hazards
- GHS labelling
Pictograms	(GHS07: Exclamation mark)
Signal word	Warning
Hazard statements	H315, H319, H335
Precautionary statements	P261, P264, P264+P265, P271, P280, P302+P352, P304+P340, P305+P351+P338, P319, P321, P332+P317, P337+P317, P362+P364, P403+P233, P405, P501
- Except where otherwise noted, data are given for materials in their standard state (at 25 °C [77 °F], 100 kPa). verify (what is ?) Infobox references

Chromium(III) picolinate is a chemical compound with the formula Cr(C_{5}H_{4}N(CO_{2}))_{3}, commonly abbreviated as CrPic_{3}. It is a bright-red coordination compound derived from chromium(III) and picolinic acid.

Chromium(III) picolinate is occasionally referred to as "trivalent chromium" when used as a supplement because it contains trivalent chromium (Cr^{3+}). Trivalent chromium occurs naturally in many foods and is one of several forms of chromium sold as a dietary supplement intended to correct chromium deficiency. However, there is no evidence of chromium deficiency in healthy people and no medical symptoms of chromium deficiency exist. Supplementation with trivalent chromium does not prevent or treat obesity, impaired prediabetes condition, type 2 diabetes or metabolic syndrome, and is not considered effective for maintaining or losing body weight.

Although daily doses of trivalent chromium up to 1,000 μg are considered to be safe, some adverse effects have been reported, and there is no clinical evidence that chromium supplementation provides any health benefit.

== History ==
Although some research suggested that chromium(III) picolinate may assist in weight loss and increase muscle mass, a 2013 Cochrane review was unable to find "reliable evidence to inform firm decisions" to support such claims.

Among the transition metals, Cr^{3+} is the most controversial in terms of nutritional value and toxicity. Furthermore, this controversy is amplified by the fact that no chromium-containing biomolecules have had their structure characterized, nor has the mode of action been determined. The first experiment that led to the discovery of Cr^{3+} playing a role in glucose metabolism proposed that the biologically active form of the metal existed in a protein called glucose tolerance factor, but further research indicated it is simply an artifact obtained from isolation procedures. The only accepted indicator of chromium deficiency is the reversal of symptoms that occurs when chromium(III) supplementation is administered in pharmacological doses to people on total parenteral nutrition.

== Physicochemical properties ==
Rotating video file of chromium picolinate coordination chemistry and molecular geometry

Chromium(III) picolinate is a pinkish-red compound and was first reported in 1917. It is poorly soluble in water, having a solubility of 600 μM in water at near neutral pH. Similar to other chromium(III) compounds, it is relatively inert and unreactive, meaning that this complex is stable at ambient conditions and high temperatures are required to decompose the compound. At lower pH levels, the complex hydrolyzes to release picolinic acid and free Cr^{3+}.

=== Structure ===
Chromium(III) picolinate has a distorted octahedral geometry and is isostructural to cobalt (III) and manganese (III) counterparts. Chromium(III) is a hard lewis acid and as such has high affinity to the carboxylate oxygen and medium affinity to the pyridine nitrogen of picolinate. Each picolinate ligand acts as a bidentate chelating agent and neutralizes the +3 charge of Cr^{3+}. Evidence that the Cr^{3+} center coordinates to the pyridine nitrogen comes from a shift in the IR spectra of a C=N vibration at 1602.4 cm^{−1} for free picolinic acid to 1565.9 cm^{−1} for chromium(III) picolinate. The bond length between Cr^{3+} and the nitrogen atom of the pyridine ring on picolinate ranges from 2.047 to 2.048 Å. The picolinate ligand coordinates to Cr^{3+} only when deprotonated and this is evident by the disappearance of IR bands ranging from 2400 to 2800 cm^{−1} (centered at 2500 cm^{−1}) and 1443 cm^{−1}, corresponding to the O-H stretching and bending, respectively, on the carboxyl functional group. Furthermore, this IR shift also indicates that only one oxygen atom from the carboxylate of picolinate coordinates to the Cr^{3+} center. The Cr-O bond length ranges from 1.949 to 1.957 Å. The crystal structure has only been recently described in 2013. Water does not coordinate to the Cr^{3+} center and is instead thought to hydrogen bond between other Cr(Pic)_{3} complexes to form a network of Cr(Pic)_{3} complexes.

== Biochemistry ==
Chromium was once proposed as an essential nutrient in maintaining normal blood glucose levels, but this function has not been sufficiently demonstrated. The European Food Safety Authority concluded that there is no convincing evidence to show chromium as an essential nutrient, thereby not justifying the setting of recommendations for chromium dietary intake.

=== Absorption and excretion ===
Once chromium(III) picolinate is ingested and enters the stomach, acidic hydrolysis of the complex occurs when in contact with the stomach mucosa. The hydrolyzed Cr^{3+} is present in the hexaaqua form and polymerizes to form an insoluble Cr(III)-hydroxide-oxide (the process of olation) once it reaches the alkaline pH of the small intestine. Approximately 2% of Cr^{3+} is absorbed through the gut as chromium(III) picolinate via unsaturated passive transport. Although absorption is low, CrPic_{3} absorbs more efficiently than other organic and inorganic sources (i.e. CrCl_{3} and chromium nicotinate) and thus accumulate at higher concentrations in tissues. This has been one major selling point for chromium(III) picolinate over other chromium(III) supplements. Organic sources tend to absorb better as they have ligands which are more lipophilic and usually neutralize the charge of the metal, thus permitting for easier passage through the intestinal membrane.

It has also been shown that dietary factors affect Cr^{3+} absorption. Starch, simple sugars, oxalic acid, and some amino acids tend to increase the rate of absorption of chromium(III). This is a result of ligand chelation, converting hexaaqua Cr^{3+} into more lipophilic forms. In contrast, calcium, magnesium, titanium, zinc, vanadium, and iron reduce the rate of absorption. Presumably, these ions introduce new metal-ligand equilibria, thus decreasing the lipophilic ligand pool available to Cr^{3+}. Once absorbed into the bloodstream, 80% of the Cr^{3+} from CrPic_{3} is passed along to transferrin. The exact mechanism of release is currently unknown, however, it is believed not to occur by a single electron reduction, as in the case of Fe^{3+}, due to the high instability of Cr^{2+}. Administered Cr^{3+} can be found in all tissues ranging from 10 to 100 μg/kg body weight. It is excreted primarily in the urine (80%) while the rest is excreted in sweat and feces.

==== Binding of chromium(III) to transferrin ====
The 2 binding sites of transferrin. When iron saturation is high, Cr^{3+} can compete with Fe^{3+} for binding to the C-lobe.

Transferrin, in addition to chromodulin has been identified as a major physiological chromium transport agent, although a recent study found that Cr^{3+} in fact disables transferrin from acting as a metal ion transport agent. While transferrin is highly specific for ferric ions, at normal conditions, only 30% of transferrin molecules are saturated with ferric ions, allowing for other metals, particularly those with a large charge to size ratio, to bind as well. The binding sites consist of a C-lobe and an N-lobe which are nearly identical in structure. Each lobe contains aspartic acid, histidine, 2 tyrosine residues and a bicarbonate ion that acts as a bidentate ligand to allow iron or other metals to bind to transferrin in a distorted octahedral geometry. Evidence supporting the binding of Cr^{3+} to transferrin comes from extensive clinical studies that showed a positive correlation between levels of ferritin and of fasting glucose, insulin, and glycated hemoglobin (Hb1Ac) levels. Furthermore, an in vivo study in rats showed that 80% of isotopically labelled Cr^{3+} ended up on transferrin while the rest were bound to albumin. An in vitro study showed that when chromium(III) chloride was added to isolated transferrin, the Cr^{3+} readily bound transferrin, owing to changes in the UV-Vis spectrum. The formation constant for Cr^{3+} in the C-lobe is 1.41 × 10^{10} M^{−1} and 2.04 × 10^{5} M^{−1} in the N-lobe, which indicates that Cr^{3+} preferentially binds the C-lobe. Overall, the formation constant for chromium(III) is lower than that of the ferric ion. The bicarbonate ligand is crucial in binding Cr^{3+} as when bicarbonate concentrations are very low, the binding affinity is also significantly lower. Electron paramagnetic resonance (EPR) studies have shown that below pH 6, chromium(III) binds only to the N-lobe and that at near neutral pH, chromium(III) binds to the C-lobe as well. Chromium(III) can compete with the ferric ion for binding to the C-lobe when the saturation greatly exceeds 30%. As such, these effects are only seen in patients with hemochromatosis, an iron-storage disease characterized by excessive iron saturation in transferrin.

== Mechanism of action ==
This diagram shows the insulin pathway and its role in regulating blood glucose levels

The precise composition and structure of the form of chromium having biological activity is not known.

Low-molecular-weight chromium-binding substance (LMWCr; also known as chromodulin) is an oligopeptide that seems to bind chromium(III) in the body. It consists of four amino acid residues; aspartate, cysteine, glutamate, and glycine, bonded with four (Cr^{3+}) centers. In vitro, it interacts with the insulin receptor by prolonging kinase activity through stimulating the tyrosine kinase pathway, although this effect has not been adequately shown in vivo.

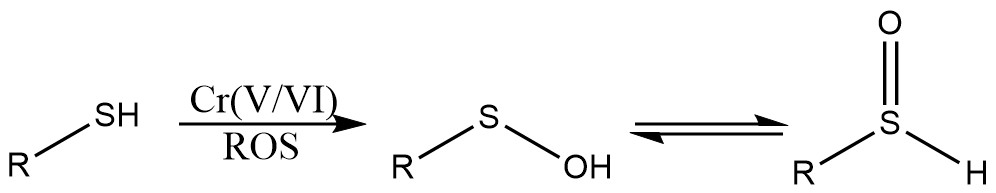
Oxidation of a cysteine residue to sulfenic acid

== Health claims ==
=== Body weight ===
Although chromium(III) picolinate has been marketed in the United States as an aid to body development for athletes, and as a means of losing weight, there is insufficient evidence that it provides this effect. Reviews have reported either no effect on either muscle growth or fat loss, or a small weight loss in trials longer than 12 weeks, preventing a conclusion about a positive effect of chromium supplementation. The European Food Safety Authority reviewed the literature and concluded that there was insufficient evidence to support a claim of effect on body weight.

=== Diabetes ===
Although there were claims that trivalent chromium supplementation aids in reducing insulin resistance, particularly in type 2 diabetes, reviews showed no association between chromium supplementation and glucose or insulin concentrations. Two reviews concluded that chromium(III) picolinate may be more effective at lowering blood glucose levels compared to other chromium-containing dietary supplements.

In 2005, the U.S. Food and Drug Administration (FDA) approved a qualified health claim for chromium picolinate as a dietary supplement relating to insulin resistance and risk of type 2 diabetes. Any company wishing to make such a claim must use the exact wording: "One small study suggests that chromium picolinate may reduce the risk of insulin resistance, and therefore possibly may reduce the risk of type 2 diabetes. FDA concludes, however, that the existence of such a relationship between chromium picolinate and either insulin resistance or type 2 diabetes is highly uncertain." As part of the petition review process, the FDA rejected other claims for reducing abnormally elevated blood sugar, risk of cardiovascular disease, risk of retinopathy or risk of kidney disease. In 2006, the FDA added that the "relationship between chromium(III) picolinate intake and insulin resistance is highly uncertain".

== Safety and toxicity ==
There is little evidence that trivalent chromium in typical supplement amounts causes toxicity in humans. Oral use of chromium is considered to be relatively safe because ingested chromium is poorly absorbed and the amount absorbed is rapidly excreted.

Use of chromium picolinate may cause an allergic reaction, headache, insomnia, or irritability, and may interfere with normal thinking and muscular coordination. It has possible interactions with dozens of prescription drugs and other supplements.

Diabetic people who take insulin should not use chromium picolinate, as it may adversely affect insulin levels and control of blood glucose. Chromium picolinate should not be used while pregnant or during breastfeeding.

Although the safety of daily chromium doses of up to 1,000 μg has been shown, there are some reports of serious adverse effects by using chromium picolinate, including kidney failure from a six-week course of 600 μg per day and liver disease after using 1,200 to 2,400 μg per day over four to five months.

== Regulation ==
In 2004, the UK Food Standards Agency advised consumers to use other forms of trivalent chromium in preference to chromium(III) picolinate until specialist advice was received from the Committee on Mutagenicity. This was due to concerns raised by the Expert Group on Vitamins and Minerals that chromium(III) picolinate might be genotoxic (cause cancer). The committee also noted two case reports of kidney failure that might have been caused by this supplement and called for further research into its safety. In December 2004, the Committee on Mutagenicity published its findings, which concluded that "overall it can be concluded that the balance of the data suggest that chromium(III) picolinate should be regarded as not being mutagenic in vitro" and that "the available in-vivo tests in mammals with chromium(III) picolinate are negative". Following these findings, the UK Food Standards Agency withdrew its advice to avoid chromium(III) picolinate, though it plans to keep its advice about chromium supplements under review.

In 2010, chromium(III) picolinate was approved by Health Canada to be used in dietary supplements. Approved labeling statements include: a factor in the maintenance of good health, provides support for healthy glucose metabolism, helps the body to metabolize carbohydrates and helps the body to metabolize fats.
