= Chromium(III) nicotinate =

Dietary mineral supplement and polynuclear chromium coordination complex

Names
- IUPAC name Chromium(3+) tri(pyridine-3-carboxylate) (idealized)
- Other names: Chromium trinicotinate; Chromium niacinate; Chromium polynicotinate; Niacin-bound chromium

Identifiers
CAS Number	64452-96-6
ChemSpider	8085563
DrugBank	DB14529
EC Number	264-891-9
PubChem CID	56843898
UNII	A150AY412V
CompTox Dashboard (EPA)	DTXSID8040561

Properties
Appearance	solid
Odor	Odorless
Melting point	Decomposes above 185 °C prior to melting
Solubility in water	Insoluble to poorly soluble in water
Solubility	Insoluble in organic solvents; unstable and slowly breaks down in coordination-active fluids

Hazards
- GHS labelling
Pictograms	(GHS07: Exclamation mark)
Signal word	Warning
Hazard statements	H315, H319, H335
Precautionary statements	P261, P280, P305+P351+P338
NFPA 704 (fire diamond)	1 0 0

Related compounds
Other anions	Chromium(III) acetate; Chromium(III) chloride
Other cations	Zinc nicotinate; Copper(II) nicotinate; Iron(III) picolinate
Related compounds	Nicotinic acid
- Except where otherwise noted, data are given for materials in their standard state (at 25 °C [77 °F], 100 kPa). Infobox references

Chromium(III) nicotinate (commonly referred to commercially as chromium polynicotinate or niacin-bound chromium) is a compound derived from chromium(III) precursors and nicotinic acid. From the perspective of inorganic chemistry, it is a coordination polymer, possibly a mixture. The material is marketed as a dietary supplement.

== Related compounds ==
- Chromium(III) picolinate, a well-defined chromium complex, also is sold as a dietary supplement.
