= Caesium chromate =

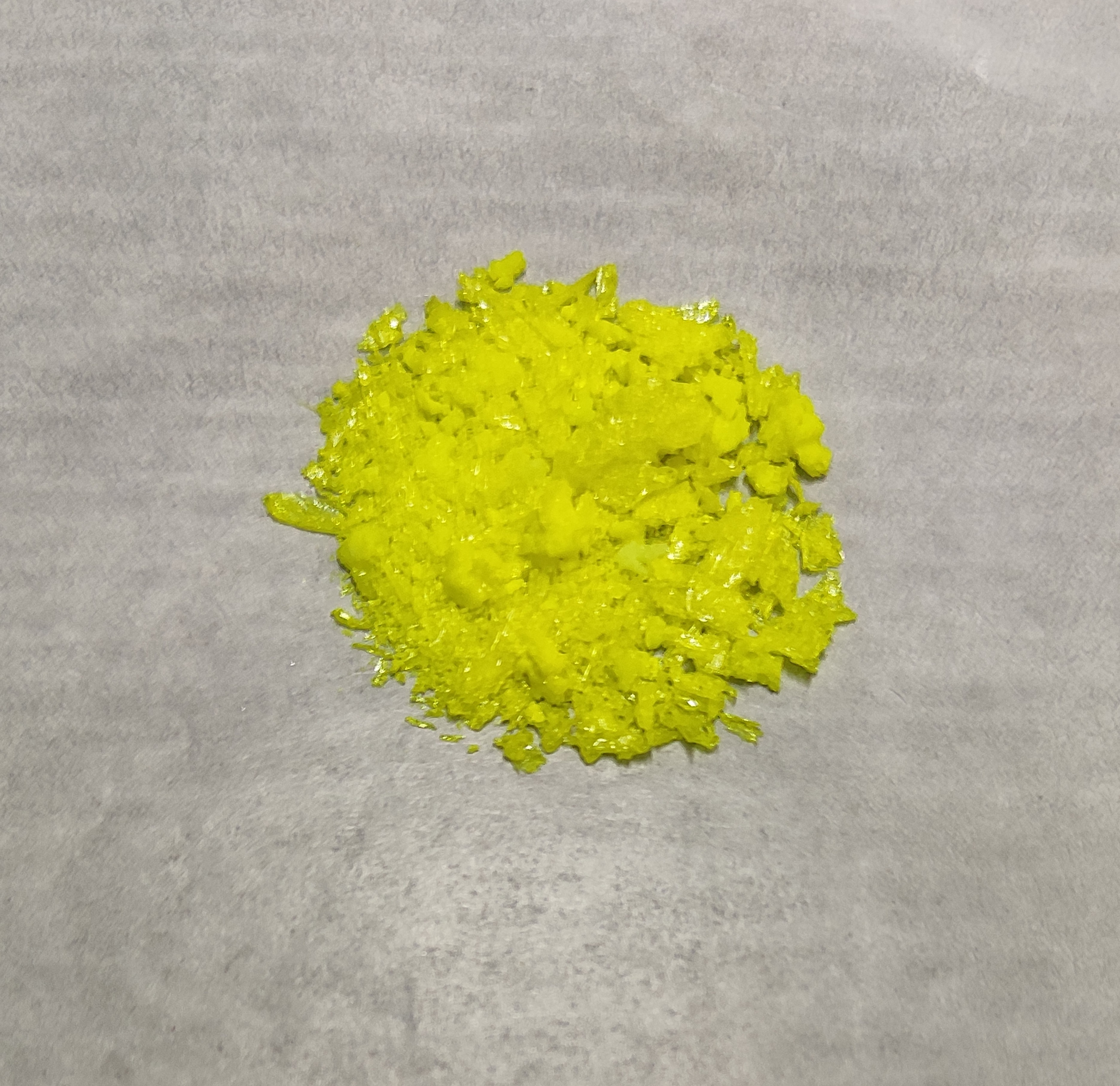

Names
- IUPAC name Caesium chromate
- Other names Dicaesium chromate

Identifiers
CAS Number	13454-78-9
3D model (JSmol)	Interactive image
ChemSpider	55521
ECHA InfoCard	100.033.296
EC Number	236-640-4
PubChem CID	61613
CompTox Dashboard (EPA)	DTXSID20894903
- InChI: InChI=1/Cr.2Cs.4O/q;2*+1;;;2*-1/rCrO4.2Cs/c2-1(3,4)5;;/q-2;2*+1 Key: BROHICCPQMHYFY-UICSPCLAAP
- SMILES: [Cs+].[Cs+].[O-][Cr]([O-])(=O)=O

Properties
Chemical formula	Cs_{2}CrO_{4}
Appearance	Yellow crystalline solid
Density	4.237 g/cm^{3}
Melting point	954 to 961 °C (1,749 to 1,762 °F; 1,227 to 1,234 K)
Solubility in water	45.50 g/100 g (25 °C)

Structure
Crystal structure	orthorhombic
Space group	Pnma (№ 62)
Lattice constant	a = 8.368 Å, b = 6.226 Å, c = 11.135 Å
Formula units (Z)	4

Hazards
- Occupational safety and health (OHS/OSH)
Main hazards	highly toxic, carcinogenic, oxidiser, environmental hazard
- GHS labelling
Pictograms	(GHS03: Oxidizing) (GHS07: Exclamation mark) (GHS08: Health hazard) (GHS09: Environmental hazard)
Signal word	Danger
Hazard statements	H272, H315, H317, H319, H335, H340, H350, H410
Precautionary statements	P203, P210, P220, P261, P264, P264+P265, P271, P272, P273, P280, P302+P352, P304+P340, P305+P351+P338, P318, P319, P321, P333+P317, P337+P317, P362+P364, P370+P378, P391, P403+P233, P405, P501
Flash point	Non-flammable

Related compounds
Other anions	Caesium sulfate
Other cations	Sodium chromate Potassium chromate Ammonium chromate
- Except where otherwise noted, data are given for materials in their standard state (at 25 °C [77 °F], 100 kPa). Infobox references

Caesium chromate or cesium chromate is an inorganic compound with the formula Cs_{2}CrO_{4}. It is a yellow crystalline solid that is the caesium salt of chromic acid, and it crystallises in the orthorhombic system.

Its major application in the past was for the production of caesium vapour during vacuum tube manufacture. Currently it is only used as the precursor for other compounds of academic interest.

== Preparation ==
Caesium chromate is mainly obtained from the reaction of chromium(VI) oxide with caesium carbonate, wherein carbon dioxide gas is evolved:

CrO_{3}(aq) + Cs_{2}CO_{3}(aq) → Cs_{2}CrO_{4}(aq) + CO_{2}(g)

Alternatively, salt metathesis between potassium chromate and caesium chloride can be performed:

K_{2}CrO_{4}(aq) + 2 CsCl(aq) → Cs_{2}CrO_{4}(aq) + 2 KCl(aq)

Finally, caesium dichromate (itself derived via salt metathesis from ammonium dichromate) yields the chromate following alkalinisation with caesium hydroxide:

Cs_{2}Cr_{2}O_{7}(aq) + 2 CsOH(aq) → 2 Cs_{2}CrO_{4}(aq) + H_{2}O(ℓ)

== Applications ==
Caesium chromate was formerly used in the final stages of creating vacuum tubes. Therein, caesium vapour was produced by reaction of caesium chromate with silicon, boron, or titanium as reducing agents. The vapour was then added to the tube to react with and remove remaining gases, including nitrogen and oxygen.
