= Strontium chromate =

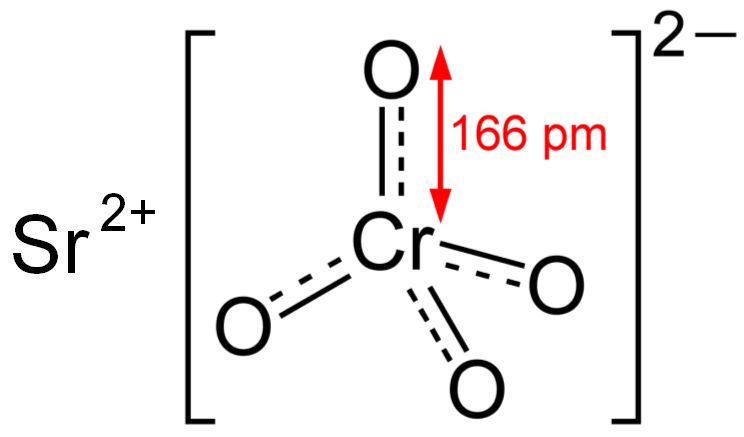

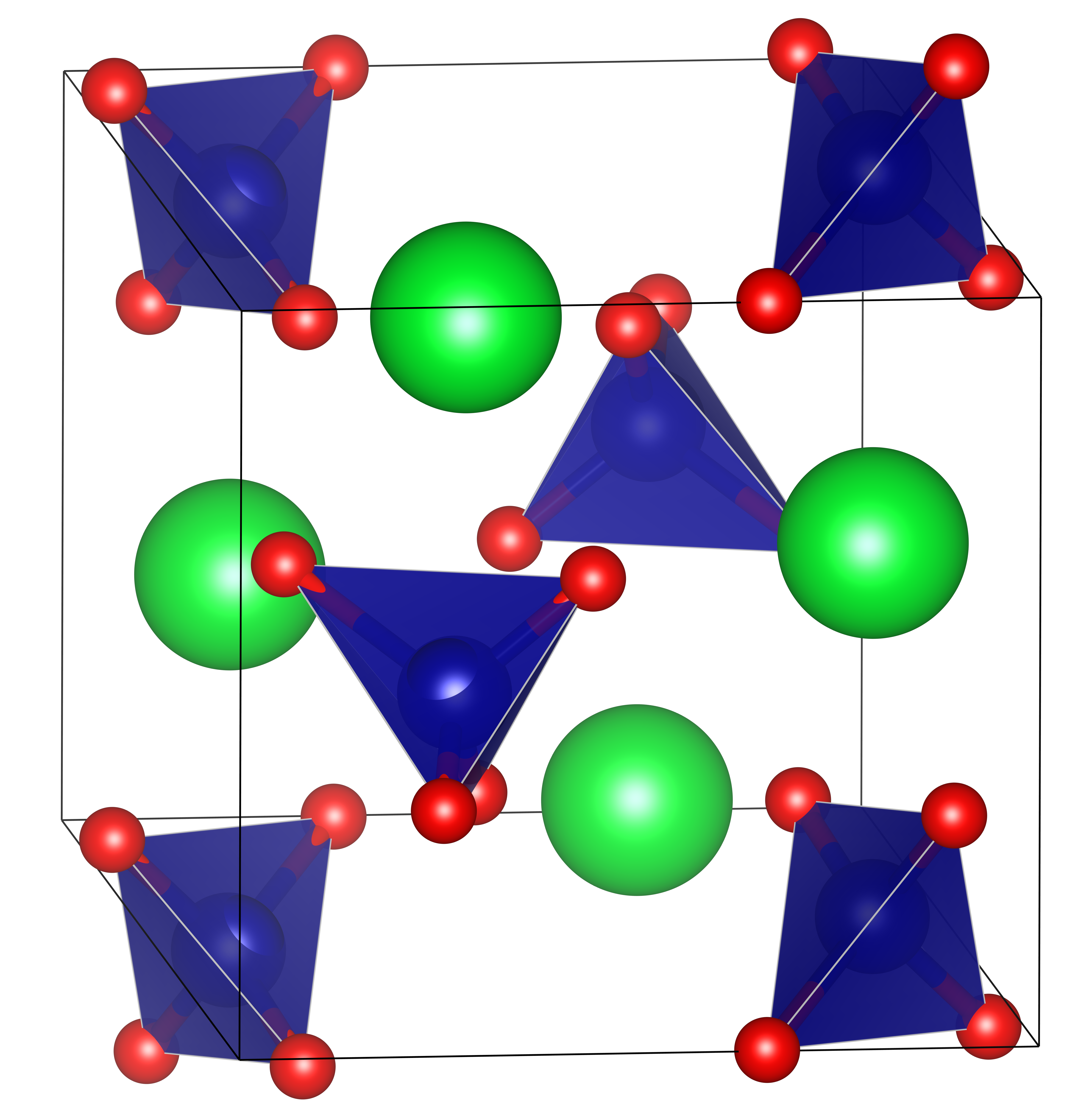

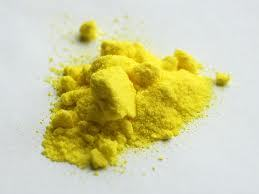
- Sample of strontium chromate

Names
- Other names: C.I. Pigment Yellow 32; C.I. 77839

Identifiers
CAS Number	7789-06-2
3D model (JSmol)	Interactive image
ChemSpider	23001
ECHA InfoCard	100.029.220
EC Number	232-142-6
PubChem CID	24599
RTECS number	GB3240000
UNII	2W214M3GS2
UN number	3288
CompTox Dashboard (EPA)	DTXSID70872832
- InChI: InChI=1S/Cr.4O.Sr/q;;;2*-1;+2 Key: NVKTUNLPFJHLCG-UHFFFAOYSA-N
- SMILES: [O-][Cr](=O)(=O)[O-].[Sr+2]

Properties
Chemical formula	SrCrO_{4}
Molar mass	203.61 g·mol^{−1}
Appearance	yellow powder
Density	3.895 g/cm^{3}
Solubility in water	0.12 g/100 mL (15 °C (59 °F)); 3 g/100 mL (100 °C (212 °F))
Solubility	Soluble in dilute acids and ammonia
Magnetic susceptibility (χ)	−5.1×10^{−6} cm^{3}/mol

Structure
Crystal structure	monoclinic
Space group	P2_{1}/c
Point group	2/m
Lattice constant	a = 7.504 Å, b = 6.842 Å, c = 8.729 Å α = 53.477°, β = 90°, γ = 90°
Lattice volume (V)	360.142 Å^{3}
Formula units (Z)	4

Hazards
- GHS labelling
Pictograms	(GHS07: Exclamation mark) (GHS08: Health hazard) (GHS09: Environmental hazard)
Signal word	Danger
Hazard statements	H302, H317, H330, H335, H341, H350, H361, H410
Precautionary statements	P201, P202, P260, P264, P270, P271, P272, P273, P280, P284, P301+P312+P330, P302+P352, P304+P340+P310, P308+P313, P333+P313, P362+P364, P391, P403+P233, P405, P501
NFPA 704 (fire diamond)	4 0 0
Threshold limit value (TLV)	0.0002 mg/m^{3} (TWA), 0.0005 mg/m^{3} (Skin) (STEL)
- Lethal dose or concentration (LD, LC)
LD_{50} (median dose)	811 mg/kg (rat, oral)
LC_{50} (median concentration)	0.27–0.51 mg/L (Rat, 4h)
- NIOSH (US health exposure limits)
PEL (Permissible)	0.1 mg/m^{3}
REL (Recommended)	0.0002 mg/m^{3} (TWA)
IDLH (Immediate danger)	15 mg/m^{3}

Related compounds
Other cations	Magnesium chromate; Barium chromate
- Except where otherwise noted, data are given for materials in their standard state (at 25 °C [77 °F], 100 kPa). Infobox references

Strontium chromate is an inorganic compound with the formula SrCrO_{4}.

== Preparation ==
Strontium chromate is prepared from strontium chloride and sodium chromate, or from strontium carbonate and sodium dichromate.

== Uses ==
- Corrosion inhibitor in pigments.
- In electrochemical processes to control sulfate concentration of solutions.
- Colorant in polyvinyl chloride resins.
- Pyrotechnics.
- Aluminium flake coatings.
- As an anti-corrosive primer for zinc, magnesium, aluminium, and alloys used in aircraft manufacture.
- As a pigment used in oil painting named strontium yellow.

== Health hazards ==
Strontium chromate is a toxic and carcinogenic compound, primarily due to its hexavalent chromium (Cr^{6+}) content. It is classified as a Group 1 carcinogen by the International Agency for Research on Cancer (IARC) which indicates that it is considered to be proven to cause cancer in humans, particularly lung cancer.
