= Calcium chromate =

Calcium Chromate
- Anhydrous calcium chromate

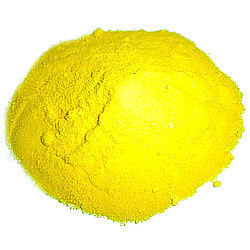
- Calcium chromate pigment

Names
- IUPAC name Calcium chromate
- Other names Calcium chromate (VI); Calcium monochromate Calcium Chrome Yellow; C. I. Pigment Yellow 33; Gelbin; Yellow Ultramarine

Identifiers
CAS Number	13765-19-0
3D model (JSmol)	Interactive image
ChemSpider	24471
ECHA InfoCard	100.033.955
EC Number	237-66-8
PubChem CID	26264
RTECS number	GB2750000
UNII	J1FGH4ZJ4M
CompTox Dashboard (EPA)	DTXSID0024717
- InChI: InChI=1S/Ca.Cr.4O/q+2;;;;2*-1 Key: RFAFBXGYHBOUMV-UHFFFAOYSA-N; InChI=1/Ca.Cr.4O/q+2;;;;2*-1/rCa.CrO4/c;2-1(3,4)5/q+2;-2 Key: RFAFBXGYHBOUMV-DETYUTSMAY
- SMILES: [Ca+2].[O-][Cr]([O-])(=O)=O

Properties
Chemical formula	CaCrO_{4}
Molar mass	156.072 g/mol
Appearance	bright yellow powder
Density	3.12 g/cm^{3}
Melting point	2,710 °C (4,910 °F; 2,980 K)
Solubility in water	anhydrous 4.5 g/100 mL (0 °C); 2.25 g/100 mL (20 °C) dihydrate 16.3 g/100mL (20 °C); 18.2 g/100mL (40 °C)
Solubility	soluble in acid practically insoluble in alcohol

Structure
Crystal structure	monoclinic

Related compounds
Other anions	Calcium dichromate
Other cations	Beryllium chromate Magnesium chromate Strontium chromate Barium chromate Radium chromate

Hazards
- Occupational safety and health (OHS/OSH)
Main hazards	highly toxic, carcinogen, mutagen
- GHS labelling
Pictograms	(GHS07: Exclamation mark) (GHS08: Health hazard) (GHS09: Environmental hazard)
Signal word	Danger
Hazard statements	H302, H350, H410
Precautionary statements	P203, P264, P273, P280, P301+P312, P308+P313
NFPA 704 (fire diamond)	3 0 1 OX
- Except where otherwise noted, data are given for materials in their standard state (at 25 °C [77 °F], 100 kPa). verify (what is ?) Infobox references

Calcium chromate is an inorganic compound with the formula CaCrO_{4}, i.e. the chromate salt of calcium. It is a bright yellow solid which is normally found in the dihydrate form CaCrO_{4}·2H_{2}O. A very rare anhydrous mineral form exists in nature, which is known as chromitite.

The compound is occasionally used as a pigment, but this usage is limited due to the very toxic and carcinogenic nature of hexavalent chromium compounds such as chromate salts.

== Synthesis and reactions ==
Calcium chromate is formed from the salt metathesis reaction of sodium chromate and calcium chloride:

Na_{2}CrO_{4} + CaCl_{2} → CaCrO_{4} + 2 NaCl

In aqueous solution the dihydrate is obtained, which loses water to afford the anhydrate at 200 °C.

It is an oxidiser, oxidising organic compounds (e.g. alcohols) or reducing agents (e.g. metals) to the corresponding carbonyl compounds or metal oxides while the chromium(VI) centre in CaCrO_{4} is reduced to chromium(III).

Solid calcium chromate will react explosively with hydrazine. It will also burn violently if mixed with boron and ignited, thereby posing a fire hazard.

== Uses ==
The compound is occasionally used as a yellow inorganic pigment, or a corrosion inhibitor as part of the chromate conversion coating procedure.

It has been also utilised in chromium electroplating, in photochemical processing, and as an industrial waste treatment.

All applications suffer from the high toxicity of chromium(VI) species to humans, with chromates listed as IARC Group 1 carcinogens while also very corrosive (e.g. capable of producing permanent eye damage) and genotoxic.
