= Beryllium chromate =

Identifiers
CAS Number	14216-88-7
3D model (JSmol)	Interactive image
- InChI: InChI=1S/Be.Cr.4O/q+2;;;;2*-1 Key: BUEWJAQVIISHRB-UHFFFAOYSA-N
- SMILES: [Be+2].[O-][Cr](=O)(=O)[O-]

Properties
Chemical formula	BeCrO_{4}
Molar mass	125.0076

Related compounds
Other cations	Magnesium chromate, Calcium chromate, Strontium chromate, Barium chromate, Radium chromate
Related compounds	Beryllium chromite
- Except where otherwise noted, data are given for materials in their standard state (at 25 °C [77 °F], 100 kPa). Infobox references

Beryllium chromate is a hypothetical inorganic compound, with the chemical formula of BeCrO_{4}. It is predicted to have a certain bonding ability with noble gases. Little evidence has been published supporting the existence of this material.

== Claims ==
Beryllium chromate is claimed to be obtained from the reaction of beryllium hydroxide and chromium trioxide:

Be(OH)_{2} + CrO_{3} → BeCrO_{4} + H_{2}O

The reaction of potassium chromate and beryllium sulfate is claimed to produce beryllium hydroxide:

BeSO_{4} + 2K_{2}CrO_{4} + H_{2}O → K_{2}Cr_{2}O_{7} + K_{2}SO_{4} + Be(OH)_{2}
