= Potassium chromate =

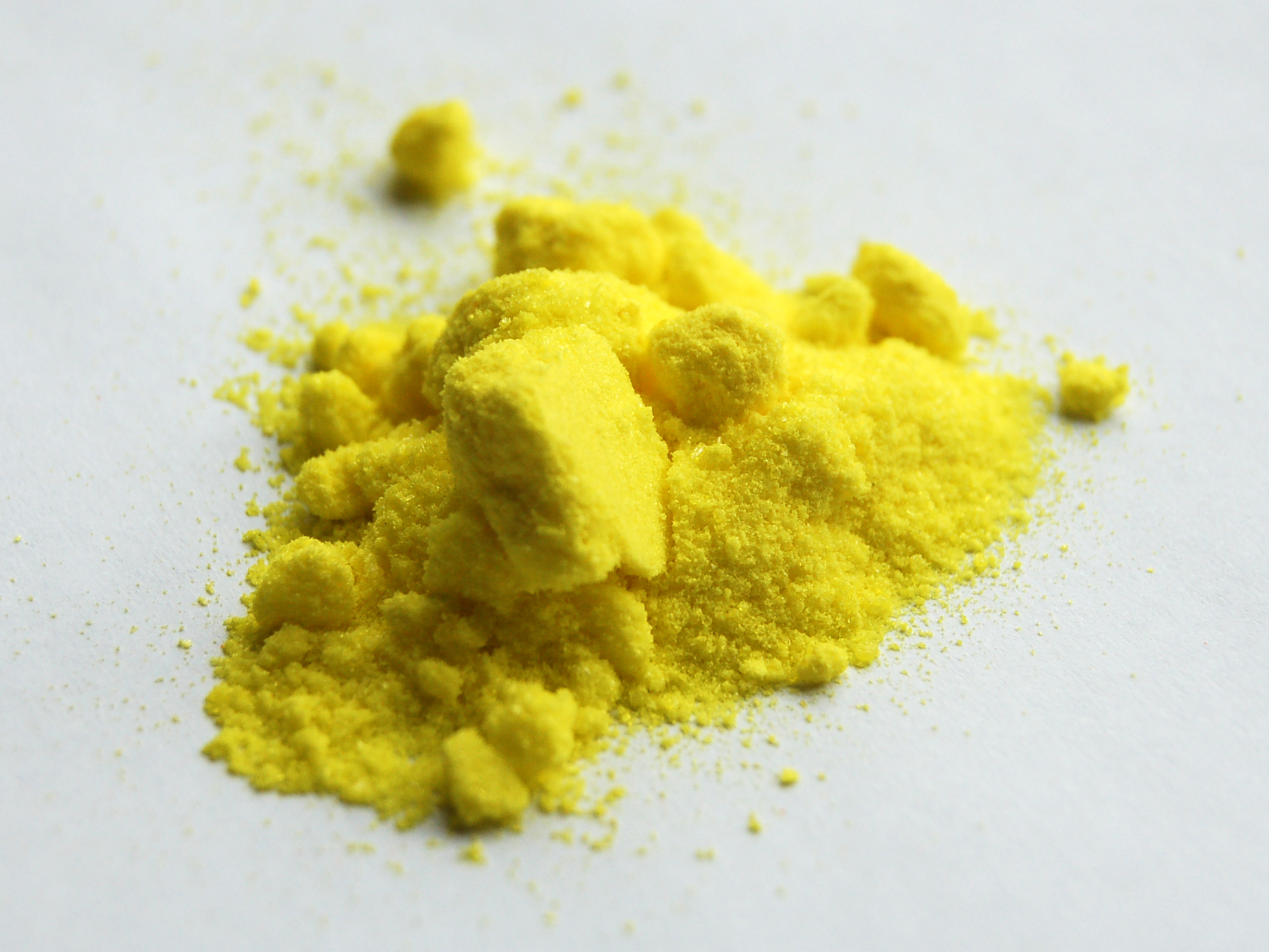

Names
- IUPAC name Potassium chromate
- Other names: Chromic acid, dipotassium salt

Identifiers
CAS Number	7789-00-6
3D model (JSmol)	Interactive image
ChEBI	CHEBI:75249
ChemSpider	22999
ECHA InfoCard	100.029.218
EC Number	232-140-5
PubChem CID	24597
RTECS number	GB2940000
UNII	5P0R38CN2X
UN number	3077
CompTox Dashboard (EPA)	DTXSID8064858
- InChI: InChI=1S/Cr.2K.4O/q;2*+1;;;2*-1 Key: XMXNVYPJWBTAHN-UHFFFAOYSA-N; InChI=K2CrO4 Key: XMXNVYPJWBTAHN-QALQIXLOAU
- SMILES: [O-][Cr](=O)(=O)[O-].[K+].[K+]

Properties
Chemical formula	K_{2}CrO_{4}
Molar mass	194.189 g·mol^{−1}
Appearance	Yellow orthorhombic crystals
Odor	odorless
Density	2.73 g/cm^{3}
Melting point	975 °C (1,787 °F; 1,248 K)
Solubility in water	65.0 g/100 mL
Magnetic susceptibility (χ)	−3.9×10^{−6} cm^{3}/mol
Refractive index (n_{D})	1.74

Structure
Crystal structure	hexagonal (α-form, above 666 °C (1,231 °F; 939 K)); rhombic (β-form, common)

Hazards
- GHS labelling
Pictograms	(GHS07: Exclamation mark) (GHS08: Health hazard) (GHS09: Environmental hazard)
Signal word	Danger
Hazard statements	H315, H317, H319, H335, H340, H350, H410
Precautionary statements	P201, P202, P261, P264, P271, P272, P273, P280, P302+P352, P304+P340+P312, P305+P351+P338, P308+P313, P333+P313, P337+P313, P362, P391, P403+P233, P405, P501
NFPA 704 (fire diamond)	2 0 0
Safety data sheet (SDS)	Fisher Scientific

Related compounds
Other anions	Potassium dichromate
Other cations	Sodium chromate; Calcium chromate; Barium chromate
Related chromates	Potassium hypochromate; Potassium perchromate
- Except where otherwise noted, data are given for materials in their standard state (at 25 °C [77 °F], 100 kPa). verify (what is ?) Infobox references

Potassium chromate is the inorganic compound with the formula K_{2}CrO_{4}. This yellow solid is the potassium salt of the chromate anion. It is a common laboratory chemical, whereas sodium chromate is important industrially.

== Structure ==
Two crystalline forms are known, both being very similar to the corresponding potassium sulfate. Orthorhombic β-K_{2}CrO_{4} is the common form, but it converts to an α-form above 666 °C (1,231 °F).

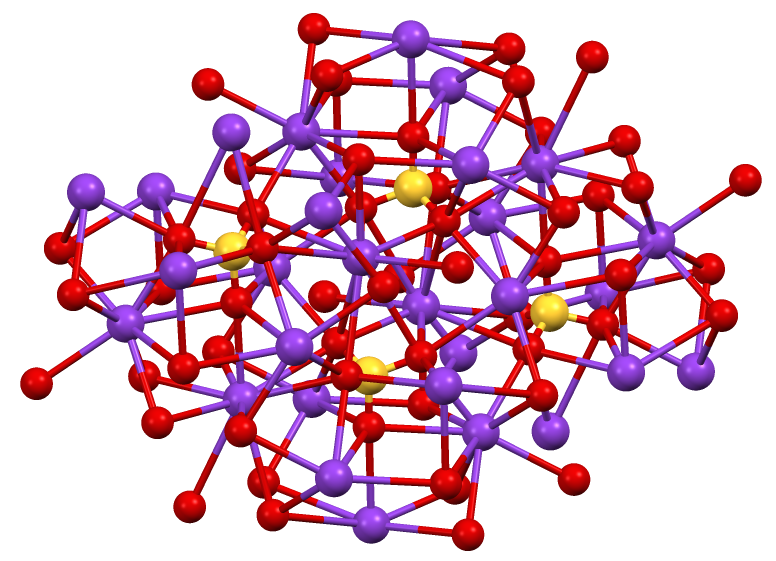
Structure of β-K_{2}CrO_{4}

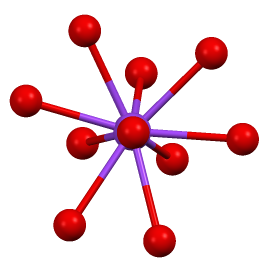
Coordination sphere of one of two types of K^{+} site

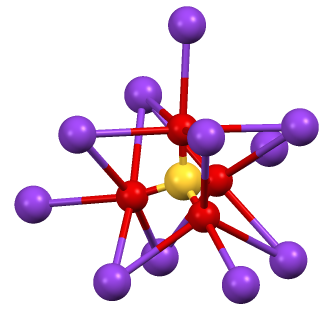
The environment about the tetrahedral CrO^{2−}_{4} center in β-K_{2}CrO_{4}

== Production and reactions ==
It is prepared by treating potassium dichromate with potassium hydroxide:

K_{2}Cr_{2}O_{7}(aq) + 2 KOH → 2 K_{2}CrO_{4} + H_{2}O

Or with potassium carbonate:

K_{2}Cr_{2}O_{7} + K_{2}CO_{3} → 2 K_{2}CrO_{4} + CO_{2}

Or, the fusion of potassium hydroxide and chromium trioxide:

2 KOH + CrO_{3} → K_{2}CrO_{4} + H_{2}O

When treated with lead(II) nitrate, it gives an orange-yellow precipitate, lead(II) chromate.

== Applications ==
Unlike the less expensive sodium salt, the potassium salt is mainly used for laboratory work in situations where an anhydrous salt is required, or as an oxidizing agent in organic synthesis.

It is used in qualitative inorganic analysis, e.g. as a colorimetric test for silver ion. It is also used as an indicator in precipitation titrations with silver nitrate to measure levels of chloride ion (the Mohr method of determining chloride) since red silver chromate is precipitated in the presence of any excess of silver ions when potassium chromate is present. This titration proceeds by the following reactions, where silver nitrate is used as the titrant:

Ag^{+} + Cl^{−} → AgCl
2 Ag^{+} + CrO^{−}_{4} → Ag_{2}CrO_{4}

== Safety ==
As with other Cr(VI) compounds, potassium chromate is carcinogenic. Positive associations with lung cancer at a very high rate, and nasal / sinus cancer at a 100x lower rate than lung cancer have been found using worker exposure data. In general, less soluble chromates are a larger chronic hazard as they can be encapsulated in the lung without being absorbed and excreted, giving more time for reactive intermediates to be produced. Animal data indicates a potential for impaired fertility, heritable genetic damage and harm to unborn children, along with other types of cancer via less common exposure routes.

As a highly soluble hexavalent chromium compound, potassium chromate is also acutely toxic, though it is poorly absorbed from the intestinal tract. The compound is also corrosive and exposure may produce severe eye damage or blindness.
