= Potassium dichromate =

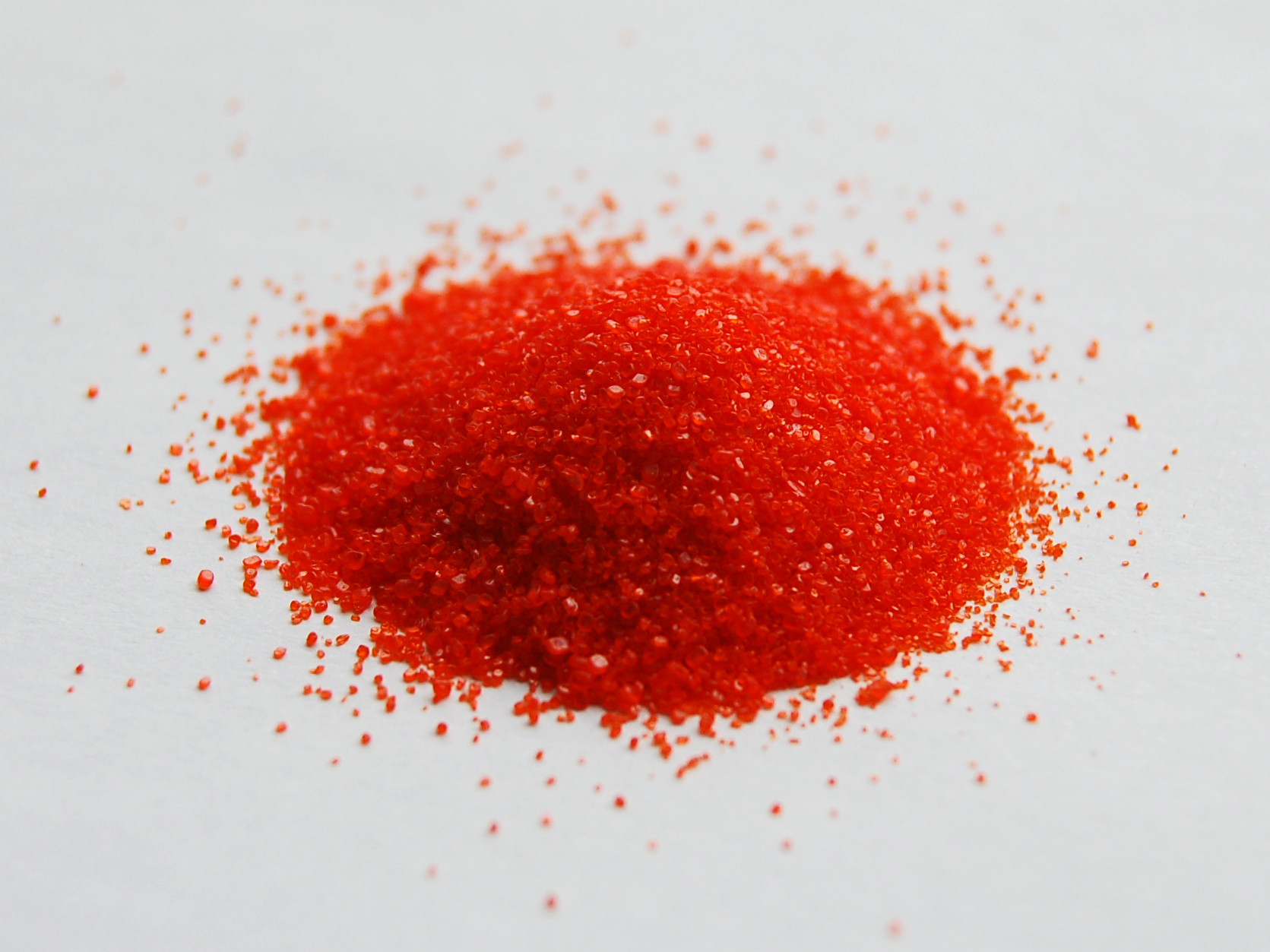
- Potassium dichromate
- 2 K^{+} [O_{3}Cr−O−CrO_{3}]^{2−}

Names
- IUPAC name Potassium dichromate(VI)
- Other names: potassium bichromate; bichromate of potash; dipotassium dichromate; dichromic acid, dipotassium salt; chromic acid, dipotassium salt; lópezite

Identifiers
CAS Number	7778-50-9
3D model (JSmol)	Interactive image
ChEMBL	ChEMBL1374101
ChemSpider	22910
ECHA InfoCard	100.029.005
EC Number	231-906-6
PubChem CID	24502
RTECS number	HX7680000
UNII	T4423S18FM
UN number	3288
CompTox Dashboard (EPA)	DTXSID5025948
- InChI: InChI=1S/2Cr.2K.7O/q;;2*+1;;;;;;2*-1 Key: KMUONIBRACKNSN-UHFFFAOYSA-N
- SMILES: [K+].[K+].[O-][Cr](=O)(=O)O[Cr]([O-])(=O)=O

Properties
Chemical formula	K_{2}Cr_{2}O_{7}
Molar mass	294.182 g·mol^{−1}
Appearance	red-orange crystalline solid
Odor	odorless
Density	2.68 g/cm^{3}, solid
Melting point	398 °C (748 °F; 671 K)
Boiling point	500 °C (932 °F; 773 K) decomposes
Solubility in water	15.1 g/100g
Refractive index (n_{D})	1.738

Structure
Crystal structure	Triclinic (α-form, <241.6 °C (466.9 °F; 514.8 K))
Coordination geometry	Tetrahedral (for Cr)

Thermochemistry
Heat capacity (C)	219 J/mol
Std molar entropy (S^{⦵}_{298})	291.2 J/(K·mol)
Std enthalpy of formation (Δ_{f}H^{⦵}_{298})	−2033 kJ/mol

Hazards
- GHS labelling
Pictograms	(GHS03: Oxidizing) (GHS05: Corrosive) (GHS06: Toxic) (GHS07: Exclamation mark) (GHS08: Health hazard) (GHS09: Environmental hazard)
Signal word	Danger
Hazard statements	H272, H301, H312, H314, H317, H330, H334, H335, H340, H350, H360, H372, H410
Precautionary statements	P201, P202, P210, P220, P221, P260, P264, P270, P271, P272, P273, P280, P284, P301+P310+P330, P301+P330+P331, P303+P361+P353, P304+P340+P310, P305+P351+P338+P310, P308+P313, P333+P313, P342+P311, P363, P370+P378, P391, P403+P233, P405, P501
NFPA 704 (fire diamond)	4 0 1 OX
Threshold limit value (TLV)	0.2 μg/m^{3} (TWA), 0.5 μg/m^{3} Skin (STEL)
- Lethal dose or concentration (LD, LC)
LD_{50} (median dose)	25 mg/kg (oral, rat)
LC_{50} (median concentration)	0.083 mg/L (Rat, female, inhalation, dust/mist)
- NIOSH (US health exposure limits)
PEL (Permissible)	5 μg/m^{3} (TWA, as CrO_{3})
REL (Recommended)	0.2 μg/m^{3} (TWA, as Cr)
IDLH (Immediate danger)	15 mg/m^{3} (as Cr(VI))

Related compounds
Other anions	Potassium chromate; Potassium molybdate; Potassium tungstate
Other cations	Ammonium dichromate; Sodium dichromate
Related compounds	Potassium permanganate
- Except where otherwise noted, data are given for materials in their standard state (at 25 °C [77 °F], 100 kPa). verify (what is ?) Infobox references

Potassium dichromate is the inorganic compound with the formula K_{2}Cr_{2}O_{7}. An orange solid, it is used in diverse laboratory and industrial applications. As with all hexavalent chromium compounds, it is chronically harmful to health. It is a crystalline ionic solid with a very bright, red-orange color. The salt is popular in laboratories because it is not deliquescent, in contrast to the more industrially relevant salt sodium dichromate.

== Production ==
Potassium dichromate is usually prepared by the reaction of sodium dichromate and potassium chloride in the presence of an acid. Potassium dichromate precipitates, because it has a lower solubility than the corresponding sodium salt. Alternatively, it can be also obtained from potassium chromate by roasting chromite ore with potassium hydroxide:

FeCr_{2}O_{4} + 2 KOH + 1.5 O_{2} → K_{2}Cr_{2}O_{7} + Fe(OH)_{2}

== Structure ==
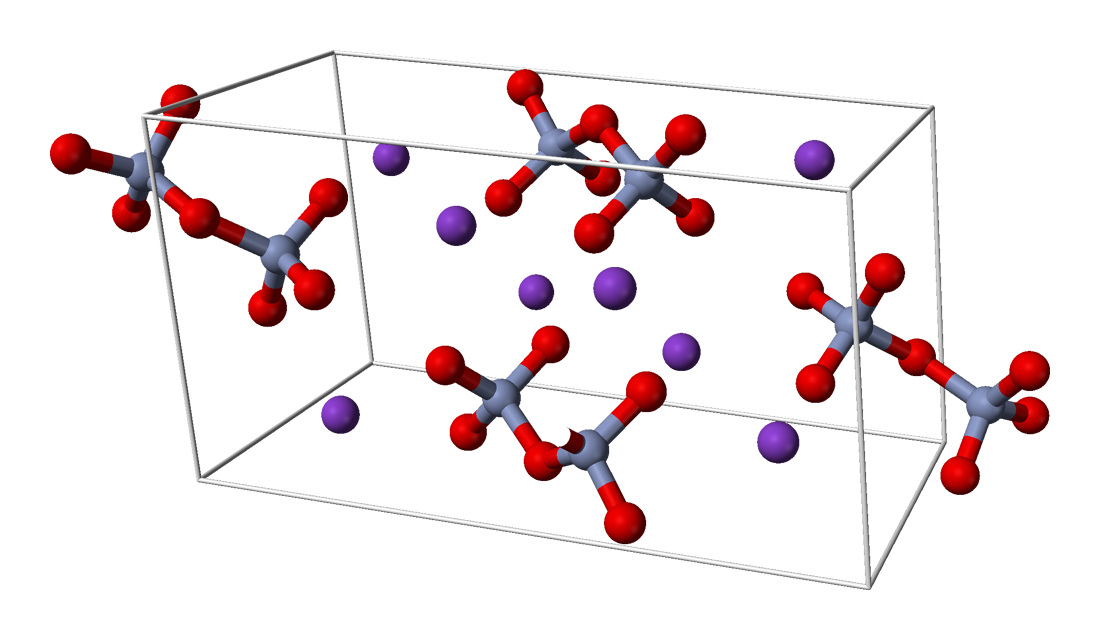
Unit cell of potassium dichromate

X-ray crystallography shows that it is a salt. Two polymorphs are known, but the structure of the dichromate anion is the same in each. It ionizes when dissolved in water, releasing Cr_{2}O^{2−}_{7}. Thus in aqueous solution, it is the dichromate ion that matters in terms of chemical reactions and environmental impact. This anion is a corner-shared bitetrahedron, resembling pyrophosphate.

== Reactions ==
=== Inorganic ===
When heated strongly, it decomposes with the evolution of oxygen.

4 K_{2}Cr_{2}O_{7} → 4 K_{2}CrO_{4} + 2 Cr_{2}O_{3} + 3 O_{2}

When an alkali is added to an orange-red solution containing dichromate ions, a yellow solution is obtained due to the formation of chromate ions (CrO^{2−}_{4}). For example, potassium chromate is produced industrially using potassium carbonate:

K_{2}Cr_{2}O_{7} + K_{2}CO_{3} → 2 K_{2}CrO_{4} + CO_{2}

Treatment with cold sulfuric acid gives red of chromic anhydride (chromium trioxide, CrO_{3}):

K_{2}Cr_{2}O_{7} + 2 H_{2}SO_{4} → 2 CrO_{3} + 2 KHSO_{4} + H_{2}O

On heating with concentrated acid, oxygen is evolved:

2 K_{2}Cr_{2}O_{7} + 8 H_{2}SO_{4} → 2 K_{2}SO_{4} + 2 Cr_{2}(SO_{4})_{3} + 8 H_{2}O + 3 O_{2}

Potassium dichromate is readily reduced by sulfur dioxide:

K_{2}Cr_{2}O_{7} + H_{2}SO_{4} + 3 SO_{2} → K_{2}SO_{4} + Cr_{2}(SO_{4})_{3} + H_{2}O

In addition to providing a route to chromium(III) sulfate, this reaction was once the basis of a test for sulfur dioxide.

Potassium trichromate (K_{2}Cr_{3}O_{10}) is prepared by evaporating a solution of potassium dichromate in nitric acid (d = 1.19) over concentrated sulfuric acid at low temperature. The tetrachromate (K_{2}Cr_{4}O_{13}) is prepared by evaporating a solution of the trichromate in nitric acid (d = 1.4-1.5) slowly on a sand bath.

Potassium dichromate reacts with hydrogen chloride to give chromyl chloride:

K_{2}Cr_{2}O_{7} + 6 HCl → 2 CrO_{2}Cl_{2} + 2 KCl + 3 H_{2}O

=== Analytical reagent ===
Because it is non-hygroscopic, potassium dichromate was a common reagent in classical "wet tests" in analytical chemistry.

=== Organic chemistry ===
Potassium dichromate is an oxidising agent in organic chemistry. It is a member of a large collection of chromium-based oxidants. Oxidations are often conducted in the presence of sulfuric acid, which favors the formation of chromium trioxide, which is the active oxidation reagent.

It is milder and more selective than potassium permanganate. It is often used interchangeably with sodium dichromate, although the use of chromates has declined owing to environmental concerns (see Hexavalent chromium). Especially in the presence of acids such as sulfuric acid, it is well known to oxidize alcohols. It converts primary alcohols into aldehydes and, under more forcing conditions, into carboxylic acids. In contrast, potassium permanganate tends to give carboxylic acids as the sole products. Secondary alcohols are converted into ketones. Tertiary alcohols are not oxidized.

Oxidations by dichromate are accompanied by a color change from yellow-orange for Cr(VI) to green for Cr(III). The color change, a colorimetric test, exhibited can be used as a test to distinguish aldehydes from ketones. Aldehydes are oxidized further, whereas ketones resist oxidation by dichromate salts.

In some cases, potassium dichromate can cleave C=C bonds.

Potassium dichromate is a classical reagent for the preparation of naphthoquinones.

=== Leather ===
Potassium dichromate has few major applications, as the sodium salt is dominant industrially. The main use is as a precursor to potassium chrome alum, used in leather tanning.

=== Wood treatment ===
Potassium dichromate is used to stain certain types of wood by darkening the tannins in the wood. It produces deep, rich browns that cannot be achieved with modern color dyes. It is a particularly effective treatment on mahogany.

== Natural occurrence ==
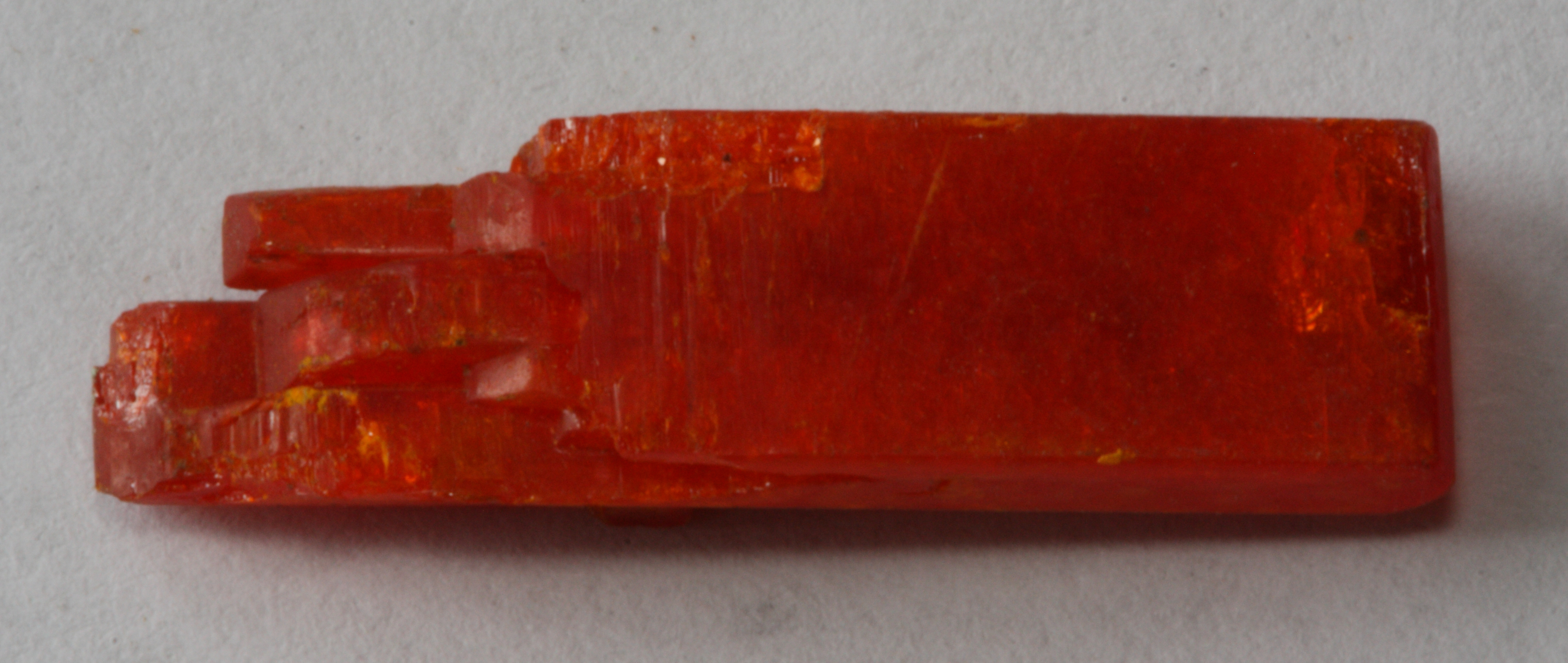
A ~10 mm crystal of potassium dichromate in the same form as the mineral lópezite

Potassium dichromate occurs naturally as the rare mineral lópezite. It has only been reported as vug fillings in the nitrate deposits of the Atacama Desert of Chile and in the Bushveld igneous complex of South Africa.

== Safety ==
Potassium dichromate is a prevalent allergen in patch tests (4.8%). Its presence in cement can cause contact dermatitis in construction workers after extended exposure. In general, it is one of the most common causes of chromium dermatitis. Aquatic organisms are vulnerable to poisoning by dichromate salts, but far less so than organic pollutants.

As with other Cr(VI) compounds, potassium dichromate is carcinogenic. The compound is also corrosive and exposure may damage eyes. Human exposure further causes impaired fertility.
