= Mohindar Singh Seehra =

Indian-American Physicist

- Born: 1940 (age 85–86)
- Occupations: Physicist, academic, author and researcher
- Awards: Order of Vandalia Award, West Virginia University; Fellow, American Physical Society

Academic background
- Education: B.Sc Physics, Chemistry, Mathematics; M.Sc., Physics; Ph.D., Condensed Matter Physics
- Alma mater: R. K. Arya College; Aligarh University; University of Rochester

Academic work
- Institutions: West Virginia University

Mohindar Singh Seehra (born 1940) is an Indian-American Physicist, academic and researcher. He is Eberly Distinguished Professor Emeritus at West Virginia University (WVU).

Seehra has authored over 325 publications. His research has focused on structural and magnetic properties of materials, with focus on nanomaterials and thin films, and their applications in catalysis and biomedicine. He is a fellow of the Alfred P. Sloan Foundation, American Physical Society (APS), and Institute of Physics (UK). WVU has honored him with the Buswell Award for advancing the career of women scientists under his mentorship and Order of Vandalia Award for Distinguished Service.

Seehra has edited books on Magnetic Spinels, Nanostructured Materials, and Noble and Precious Metals, published by InTech Publishers (UK).

== Early life and education ==
Seehra was born in 1940 in a village near the town of Burewala which is now part of Pakistan. During the independence and partition of British India in 1947, he along with his family migrated to India and received his early education there. He graduated from high school in 1955, followed by B.Sc. degree in 1959 from R.K. Arya College of Punjab University. He then worked as a Laboratory Instructor in Chemistry at the Arya College for one year. In 1960, he enrolled in Aligarh University and received his M.Sc. degree in Physics in 1962, followed by one-year teaching as a Lecturer in Physics at Jain College, Ambala City. In 1963, he moved to the United States, earning his Ph.D. in Physics from the University of Rochester in 1969.

== Career ==
After receiving Ph.D. in 1969, Seehra joined West Virginia University (WVU) as Assistant Professor of Physics, becoming Associate Professor in 1973 and full Professor in 1977. In 1992, he was appointed Eberly Family Distinguished Professor of Physics. After retiring in 2016 as Eberly Distinguished Professor Emeritus at WVU, he continues collaborative research with research groups in USA and India.

== Research ==
Broadly, Seehra's research work has focused on structural and magnetic properties of transition metal oxides, sulfides, fluorides, spinels, perovskites and carbons, and size and surface effects in magnetic nanostructures and their applications in catalysis and biomedicine.

=== Magnetic nanoparticles ===
Seehra's work includes that on CuO nanoparticles (NPs) which showed strong size and temperature dependence of magnetism in CuO NPs prepared by the sol-gel method and structural characterization via x-ray diffraction and high-resolution transmission electron microscopy. For CeO_{2} NPs with applications in biomedicine and catalysis, his research implied that transformation of Ce^{4+} to Ce^{3+} driven by oxygen vacancies is the key factor to understand the catalytic properties of ceria. Another important research has been the ferromagnetic and semiconducting behavior of sputtered Co-doped TiO_{2} thin films above room temperature. For Co_{3}O_{4} NPs, he used magnetic and electron magnetic resonance studies and showed how the properties of NPs differ from those of bulk Co_{3}O_{4}. Among his other notable magnetic studies on NPs are those on nearly defect-free maghemite NPs, ferrihydrite NPs undoped and doped with Ni, Mo, and Ir, CdSe quantum dots, and FePt NPs. His study regarding the size dependence of magnetic properties of maghemite NPs demonstrated unusual enhancement of effective magnetic anisotropy with decreasing particle size.

=== Electron paramagnetic resonance (EPR) spectroscopy ===
Trained in EPR spectroscopy during his Ph.D. work, Seehra discovered the sample size effect in EPR which affects the EPR linewidths, he then went on to study various factors that affect the EPR linewidths with special attention to the changes observed near magnetic ordering temperatures such as in antiferromagnet MnF_{2}, and ferromagnets CrBr_{3} and La_{0.7}Sr_{0.3}MnO_{3}, and (K_{3}CrO_{8}). He also conducted a study focused on the role of magnetic anisotropy and spin-lattice coupling in the temperature dependence of EPR linewidths. His research combining theory, EPR and magnetic studies explained the origin of spin canting in Mn_{3}O_{4}.

=== Magnetic-Optical-Dielectric Correlations ===
In his paper published in 2006, he studied structural and multiferroic properties of La-modified BiFeO_{3} ceramics and showed enhancement in the multiferroic properties of BiFeO_{3} due to stabilization of crystal structure and nonuniformity in spin cycloid structure by La substitution. Seehra investigated the temperature dependence of dielectric constants of MnO and MnF_{2} and discussed how the dielectric, magnetic and optical properties are related. In NiO NPs, his studies showed how the size dependence of the magnetic ordering temperature and optical properties are related. The decrease in the optical band gap of the semiconductor FeS_{2} with increase in temperature were compared with those in Si and Ge.

=== Carbons ===
Seehra's research on carbons include modeling of disorder in graphitic carbons, x-ray diffraction and Raman spectroscopy of commercial graphene-based materials and use of nanocarbons for energy-efficient hydrogen production via water electrolysis.

== Awards and honors ==
- 1973-76 - Research Fellow, Alfred P. Sloan Foundation
- 1984 - Fellow, American Physical Society
- 1985 - Outstanding Researcher of the College of Arts and Sciences award, West Virginia University
- 1992 - Eberly Family Distinguished Professor of Physics, West Virginia University
- 2001 - Fellow, Institute of Physics(UK)
- 2010 - Outstanding Referee, American Physical Society (APS)
- 2015 - Mary Catherine Buswell Award, West Virginia University
- 2017 - Albert Nelson Marquis Lifetime Achievement Award, Marquis Who's Who in America
- 2019 - Order of Vandalia Award for distinguished service to West Virginia University

== Bibliography ==
- Punnoose, A., Magnone, H., Seehra, M. S., & Bonevich, J. (2001). Bulk to nanoscale magnetism and exchange bias in CuO nanoparticles. Physical Review B, 64(17), 174420.
- Park, W. K., Ortega-Hertogs, R. J., Moodera, J. S., Punnoose, A., & Seehra, M. S. (2002). Semiconducting and ferromagnetic behavior of sputtered Co-doped TiO 2 thin films above room temperature. Journal of Applied Physics, 91(10), 8093-8095.
- Dutta, P., Pal, S., Seehra, M. S., Shi, Y., Eyring, E. M., & Ernst, R. D. (2006). Concentration of Ce3+ and oxygen vacancies in cerium oxide nanoparticles. Chemistry of Materials, 18(21), 5144-5146.
- Das, S. R., Choudhary, R. N. P., Bhattacharya, P., Katiyar, R. S., Dutta, P., Manivannan, A., & Seehra, M. S. (2007). Structural and multiferroic properties of La-modified Bi Fe O 3 ceramics. Journal of Applied physics, 101(3), 034104.
- Dutta, P., Seehra, M. S., Thota, S., & Kumar, J. (2007). A comparative study of the magnetic properties of bulk and nanocrystalline Co3O4. Journal of Physics: Condensed Matter, 20(1), 015218.
