= Potassium hypochromate =

Names
- Other names: Potassium chromate(V)

Identifiers
3D model (JSmol)	Interactive image
- InChI: InChI=1S/Cr.3K.4O/q;3*+1;;3*-1 Key: NMRPGYPWHVGGTN-UHFFFAOYSA-N
- SMILES: O=[Cr-3](=O)(=O)=O.[K+].[K+].[K+]

Properties
Chemical formula	K_{3}CrO_{4}
Molar mass	233.2886 g/mol
Appearance	Green solid
Melting point	1,000 °C (1,830 °F; 1,270 K) (decomposes)
Solubility in water	Soluble, decomposes (25 °C)

Structure
Crystal structure	Similar to potassium hypomanganate

Thermochemistry
Std enthalpy of formation (Δ_{f}H^{⦵}_{298})	−370 ± 2 kcal mol^{−1}

Hazards
Flash point	Not flammable

Related compounds
Other anions	Potassium hypomanganate
Other cations	Sodium hypochromate
Related chromates	Potassium chromate Potassium perchromate
- Except where otherwise noted, data are given for materials in their standard state (at 25 °C [77 °F], 100 kPa). Infobox references

Potassium hypochromate is a chemical compound with the formula K_{3}CrO_{4} with the unusual Cr^{5+} ion. This compound is unstable in water but stable in alkaline solution and was found to have a similar crystal structure to potassium hypomanganate.

== Preparation ==
This compound is commonly prepared by reacting chromium(III) oxide and potassium hydroxide at 850 °C under argon:

Cr_{2}O_{3} + 6 KOH → 2 K_{3}CrO_{4} + H_{2}O + 2 H_{2}

This compound can be prepared other ways such as replacing chromium oxide with potassium chromate. It is important that there is no Fe^{2+} ions present because it would reduce the Cr(V) ions to Cr(III) ions.

== Reactions ==
Potassium hypochromate decomposes in water to form chromium(III) oxide and potassium chromate when alkali is not present or low. Potassium hypochromate also reacts with acids such as hydrochloric acid to form chromium(III) oxide, potassium chromate, and potassium chloride:

6 K_{3}CrO_{4} + 10 HCl → 4 K_{2}CrO_{4} + Cr_{2}O_{3} + 5 H_{2}O + 10 KCl

Other reducing agents such as hydroperoxides can oxidize the hypochromate ion into chromate ions. At extremely high temperatures, it decomposes into potassium chromate and potassium metal.

This compound is used to synthesize various compounds such as chromyl chlorosulfate by reacting this compound with chlorosulfuric acid.
