= Ammonium chromate =

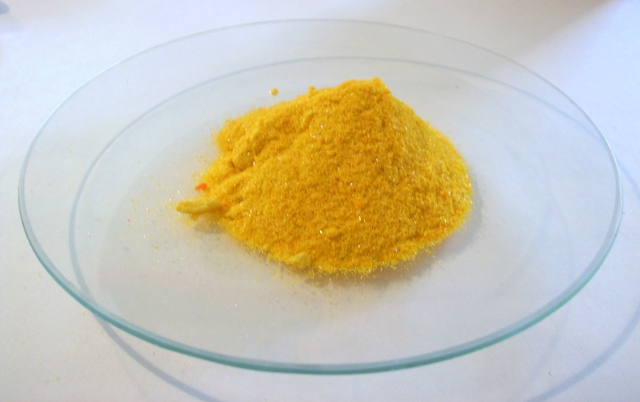

Names
- Other names Ammonium chromate(VI)

Identifiers
CAS Number	7788-98-9
3D model (JSmol)	Interactive image
ChemSpider	22997
ECHA InfoCard	100.029.217
EC Number	232-138-4
PubChem CID	24595
UNII	X7I33TTT6D
UN number	3085,3077
CompTox Dashboard (EPA)	DTXSID3064857
- InChI: InChI=1S/Cr.2H3N.4O/h;2*1H3;;;;/q;;;;;2*-1/p+2 Key: MFFLHUNPSHBKRG-UHFFFAOYSA-P
- SMILES: [NH4+].[NH4+].[O-][Cr](=O)(=O)[O-]

Properties
Chemical formula	(NH_{4})_{2}CrO_{4}
Molar mass	152.07 g/mol
Appearance	yellow crystals
Density	1.90 g/ml
Melting point	185 °C (365 °F; 458 K) decomposes
Solubility in water	24.8 g/100ml (0 °C); 37.36 g/100ml (25 °C); 45.3 g/100ml (40 °C); 70.06 g/100ml (75 °C)

Thermochemistry
Std molar entropy (S^{⦵}_{298})	657 J/K·mol
Std enthalpy of formation (Δ_{f}H^{⦵}_{298})	−1163 kJ/mol

Hazards
- Occupational safety and health (OHS/OSH)
Main hazards	Toxic
- GHS labelling
Pictograms	(GHS03: Oxidizing) (GHS05: Corrosive) (GHS08: Health hazard) (GHS09: Environmental hazard)
Signal word	Danger
Hazard statements	H272, H314, H317, H334, H350, H400
Precautionary statements	P201, P220, P261, P273, P280, P305+P351+P338
- Except where otherwise noted, data are given for materials in their standard state (at 25 °C [77 °F], 100 kPa). Infobox references

Ammonium chromate is a salt with the formula (NH_{4})_{2}CrO_{4}. It forms yellow, monoclinic crystals; made from ammonium hydroxide and ammonium dichromate; used in photography as a sensitizer for gelatin coatings. It is often used in photography, textile printing, and fixing chromate dyes on wool. It is also used as an analytical reagent, catalyst, and corrosion inhibitor. It is soluble in water, and, when applied, can cause irritation in the mucous membrane, eyes, respiratory tract, skin, etc. It may cause skin sensitization after prolonged contact. It is also known to be carcinogenic (cancer-causing), and it can cause tissue ulceration and injury to the liver and kidneys.

== See also ==
- Ammonium dichromate
