= Sodium dichromate =

Inorganic compound

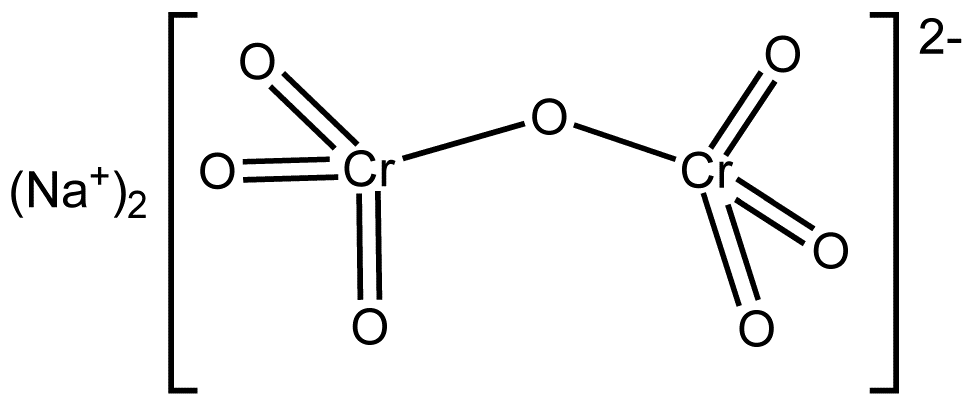

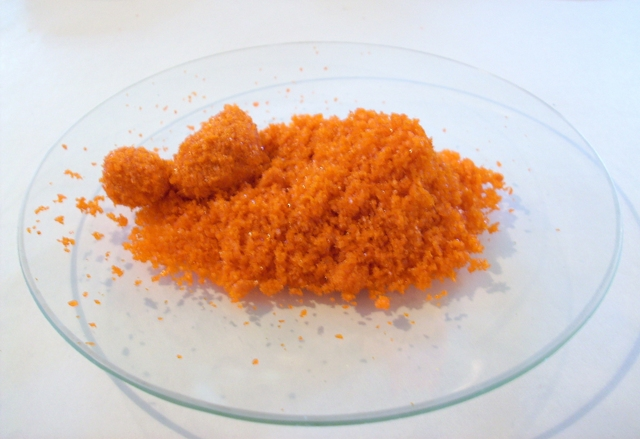

Names
- IUPAC name Sodium dichromate
- Other names Chromic acid disodium salt

Identifiers
CAS Number	10588-01-9; 7789-12-0 (dihydrate)
3D model (JSmol)	Interactive image
ChEBI	CHEBI:39483
ChemSpider	23723
ECHA InfoCard	100.031.070
EC Number	234-190-3
Gmelin Reference	21597
PubChem CID	25408
RTECS number	HX7750000 HX7750000 (dihydrate)
UNII	C9G6VY6ZZ4; 52125XYY2A (dihydrate)
UN number	3288
CompTox Dashboard (EPA)	DTXSID8021274
- InChI: InChI=1S/2Cr.2Na.7O/q;;2*+1;;;;;;2*-1 Key: KIEOKOFEPABQKJ-UHFFFAOYSA-N; InChI=1/2Cr.2Na.7O/q;;2*+1;;;;;;2*-1/rCr2O7.2Na/c3-1(4,5)9-2(6,7)8;;/q-2;2*+1 Key: KIEOKOFEPABQKJ-RXLKZJBDAW
- SMILES: [Na+].[Na+].[O-][Cr](=O)(=O)O[Cr]([O-])(=O)=O

Properties
Chemical formula	Na_{2}Cr_{2}O_{7}
Molar mass	261.97 g/mol (anhydrous); 298.00 g/mol (dihydrate)
Appearance	bright orange
Odor	odorless
Density	2.52 g/cm^{3}
Melting point	356.7 °C (674.1 °F; 629.8 K)
Boiling point	400 °C (752 °F; 673 K) decomposes
Solubility in water	73 g/100 mL at 25 °C
Solubility in other solvents	soluble in methanol, ethanol
Refractive index (n_{D})	1.661 (dihydrate)

Hazards
- GHS labelling
Pictograms	(GHS03: Oxidizing) (GHS05: Corrosive) (GHS06: Toxic) (GHS07: Exclamation mark) (GHS08: Health hazard) (GHS09: Environmental hazard)
Signal word	Warning
Hazard statements	H272, H301, H312, H314, H317, H330, H334, H340, H350, H360, H372, H410
Precautionary statements	P201, P202, P210, P220, P221, P260, P264, P270, P271, P272, P273, P280, P281, P284, P285, P301+P310, P301+P330+P331, P302+P352, P303+P361+P353, P304+P340, P304+P341, P305+P351+P338, P308+P313, P310, P312, P314, P320, P321, P330, P333+P313, P342+P311, P363, P370+P378, P391, P403+P233, P405, P501
NFPA 704 (fire diamond)	4 0 1 OX
- Lethal dose or concentration (LD, LC)
LD_{50} (median dose)	50 mg/kg
Safety data sheet (SDS)	ICSC 1369

Related compounds
Other anions	Sodium chromate Sodium molybdate Sodium tungstate
Other cations	Potassium dichromate Ammonium dichromate
- Except where otherwise noted, data are given for materials in their standard state (at 25 °C [77 °F], 100 kPa). verify (what is ?) Infobox references

Sodium dichromate is the inorganic compound with the formula Na_{2}Cr_{2}O_{7}. However, the salt is usually handled as its dihydrate Na_{2}Cr_{2}O_{7}·2H_{2}O. Virtually all chromium ore is processed via conversion to sodium dichromate and virtually all compounds and materials based on chromium are prepared from this salt. In terms of reactivity and appearance, sodium dichromate and potassium dichromate are very similar. The sodium salt is, however, around twenty times more soluble in water than the potassium salt (49 g/L at 0 °C) and its equivalent weight is also lower, which is often desirable.

== Preparation ==
Sodium dichromate is generated on a large scale from ores containing chromium(III) oxides. The ore is fused with a base, typically sodium carbonate, at around 1000 °C in the presence of air (source of oxygen):

2 Cr_{2}O_{3} + 4 Na_{2}CO_{3} + 3 O_{2} → 4 Na_{2}CrO_{4} + 4 CO_{2}

This step solubilizes the chromium and allows it to be extracted into hot water. At this stage, other components of the ore such as aluminium and iron compounds, are poorly soluble. Acidification of the resulting aqueous extract with sulfuric acid or carbon dioxide affords the dichromate:

2 Na_{2}CrO_{4} + 2 CO_{2} + H_{2}O → Na_{2}Cr_{2}O_{7} + 2 NaHCO_{3}

2 Na_{2}CrO_{4} + H_{2}SO_{4} → Na_{2}Cr_{2}O_{7} + Na_{2}SO_{4} + H_{2}O

The dichromate is isolated as the dihydrate by crystallization. In this way, many millions of kilograms of sodium dichromate are produced annually.

Since chromium(VI) is toxic, especially as the dust, such factories are subject to stringent regulations. For example, effluent from such refineries is treated with reducing agents to return any chromium(VI) to chromium(III), which is less threatening to the environment. A variety of hydrates of this salt are known, ranging from the decahydrate below 19.5 °C (CAS# 13517-17-4 ) as well as hexa-, tetra-, and dihydrates. Above 62 °C, these salts lose water spontaneously to give the anhydrous material. It is crystallised around 30 to 35 degrees C

== Reactions ==
Dichromate and chromate salts are oxidizing agents. For the tanning of leather, sodium dichromate is first reduced with sulfur dioxide. For hexavalent chrome plating, chromate is converted to the so-called chromic acid (essentially chromium trioxide) by sulfuric acid.

=== Organic chemistry ===
Sodium dichromate is an oxidising agent in organic chemistry. It is a member of a large collection of chromium-based oxidants. Oxidations are often conducted in the presence of sulfuric acid, which favors the formation of chromium trioxide, which is the active oxidation reagent. It is milder and more selective than potassium permanganate. It is often used interchangeably with potassium dichromate. Relative to the potassium salt, the main advantage of sodium dichromate is its greater solubility in water and polar solvents like acetic acid.

Generally, the use of chromate-base reagents has declined owing to environmental concerns (see Hexavalent chromium).

Especially in the presence of acids such as sulfuric acid, it is well known to oxidize alcohols. It converts primary alcohols into aldehydes:

3 R_{2}CHOH + Cr_{2}O^{2−}_{7} + 2 H^{+} → 3 R_{2}C=O + Cr_{2}O_{3} + 4 H_{2}O

Under more forcing conditions, into carboxylic acids. In contrast, potassium permanganate tends to give carboxylic acids as the sole products. Secondary alcohols are converted into ketones. Tertiary alcohols are not oxidized.

Oxidations by dichromate are accompanied by a color change from yellow-orange for Cr(VI) to green for Cr(III). The color change, a colorimetric test, exhibited can be used as a test to distinguish aldehydes from ketones. Aldehydes are oxidized further, whereas ketones resist oxidation by dichromate salts.

Sodium dichromate oxidizes benzylic and allylic C-H bonds to carbonyl derivatives. this compound For example, 2,4,6-trinitrotoluene is oxidized to the corresponding carboxylic acid. Similarly, 2,3-dimethylnaphthalene is oxidized by Na_{2}Cr_{2}O_{7} to 2,3-naphthalenedicarboxylic acid.

Sodium dichromate can be used in fluorene to fluorenone conversion.

== Safety ==
Like all hexavalent chromium compounds, sodium dichromate is carcinogenic. The compound is also corrosive and exposure may produce severe eye damage or blindness. Human exposure further encompasses impaired fertility, heritable genetic damage and harm to unborn children.
