= Sodium chromate =

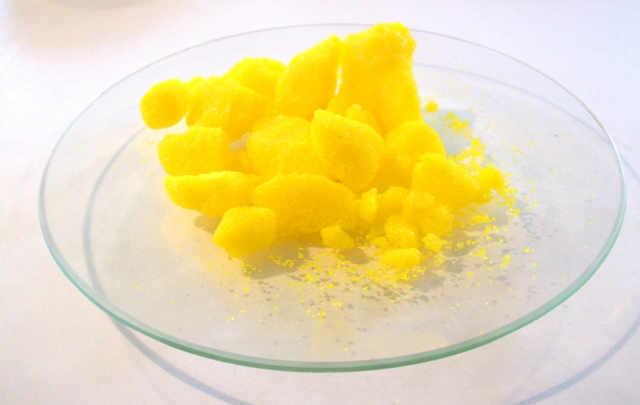

Names
- IUPAC name Sodium chromate
- Other names Chromic acid, (Na_{2}CrO_{4}), disodium salt Chromium disodium oxide Rachromate

Identifiers
CAS Number	7775-11-3
3D model (JSmol)	Interactive image
ChEBI	CHEBI:78671
ChemSpider	22896
ECHA InfoCard	100.028.990
EC Number	231-889-5
PubChem CID	24488
RTECS number	GB2955000
UNII	6A49BO6K4M
UN number	3288
CompTox Dashboard (EPA)	DTXSID7032056
- InChI: InChI=1S/Cr.2Na.4O/q;2*+1;;;2*-1
- SMILES: [O-][Cr](=O)(=O)[O-].[Na+].[Na+]

Properties
Chemical formula	Na_{2}CrO_{4}
Molar mass	161.97 g/mol
Appearance	yellow crystals
Odor	odorless
Density	2.698 g/cm^{3}
Melting point	792 °C (1,458 °F; 1,065 K) (anhydrous); 20 °C (decahydrate)
Solubility in water	31.8 g/100 mL (0 °C); 84.5 g/100 mL (25 °C); 126.7 g/100 mL (100 °C)
Solubility	slightly soluble in ethanol
Solubility in methanol	0.344 g/100 mL (25 °C)
Magnetic susceptibility (χ)	+55.0·10^{−6} cm^{3}/mol

Structure
Crystal structure	orthorhombic (hexagonal above 413 °C)

Thermochemistry
Heat capacity (C)	142.1 J/mol K
Std molar entropy (S^{⦵}_{298})	174.5 J/mol K
Std enthalpy of formation (Δ_{f}H^{⦵}_{298})	−1329 kJ/mol
Gibbs free energy (Δ_{f}G^{⦵})	−1232 kJ/mol

Hazards
- GHS labelling
Pictograms	(GHS05: Corrosive) (GHS06: Toxic) (GHS07: Exclamation mark) (GHS08: Health hazard) (GHS09: Environmental hazard)
Signal word	Danger
Hazard statements	H301, H312, H314, H317, H330, H334, H340, H350, H360, H372, H410
Precautionary statements	P201, P202, P260, P264, P270, P271, P272, P273, P280, P281, P284, P285, P301+P310, P301+P330+P331, P302+P352, P303+P361+P353, P304+P340, P304+P341, P305+P351+P338, P308+P313, P310, P312, P314, P320, P321, P330, P333+P313, P342+P311, P363, P391, P403+P233, P405, P501
NFPA 704 (fire diamond)	3 0 OX
Flash point	Non-flammable
Safety data sheet (SDS)	ICSC 1370

Related compounds
Other anions	Sodium dichromate Sodium molybdate Sodium tungstate
Other cations	Potassium chromate Calcium chromate Barium chromate
- Except where otherwise noted, data are given for materials in their standard state (at 25 °C [77 °F], 100 kPa). verify (what is ?) Infobox references

Sodium chromate is the inorganic compound with the formula Na_{2}CrO_{4}. It is a yellow hygroscopic solid, which can form tetra-, hexa-, and decahydrates. It is an intermediate in the extraction of chromium from its ores.

== Production and reactivity ==
It is obtained on a vast scale by roasting chromium ores in air in the presence of sodium carbonate:

2Cr_{2}O_{3} + 4 Na_{2}CO_{3} + 3 O_{2} → 4 Na_{2}CrO_{4} + 4 CO_{2}

This process converts the chromium into a water-extractable form, leaving behind iron oxides. Typically calcium carbonate is included in the mixture to improve oxygen access and to keep silicon and aluminium impurities in an insoluble form. The process temperature is typically around 1100 °C. For lab and small scale preparations a mixture of chromite ore, sodium hydroxide and sodium nitrate reacting at lower temperatures may be used (even 350 C in the corresponding potassium chromate system). Subsequent to its formation, the chromate salt is converted to sodium dichromate, the precursor to most chromium compounds and materials. The industrial route to chromium(III) oxide involves reduction of sodium chromate with sulfur.

=== Acid-base behavior ===
It converts to sodium dichromate when treated with acids:

2 Na_{2}CrO_{4} + 2HCl → Na_{2}Cr_{2}O_{7} + 2NaCl + H_{2}O

Further acidification affords chromium trioxide:

Na_{2}CrO_{4} + H_{2}SO_{4} → CrO_{3} + Na_{2}SO_{4} + H_{2}O

== Uses ==
Aside from its central role in the production of chromium from its ores, sodium chromate is used as a corrosion inhibitor in the petroleum industry. It is also a dyeing auxiliary in the textile industry. It is a diagnostic pharmaceutical in determining red blood cell volume.

In organic chemistry, sodium chromate is used as an oxidant, converting primary alcohols to carboxylic acids and secondary alcohols to ketones. Sodium chromate is a strong oxidizer.

== Safety ==
As with other Cr(VI) compounds, sodium chromate is carcinogenic. The compound is also corrosive and exposure may produce severe eye damage or blindness. Human exposure further encompasses impaired fertility, heritable genetic damage and harm to unborn children.

== See also ==
- Chromate and dichromate
