= Ammonium dichromate =

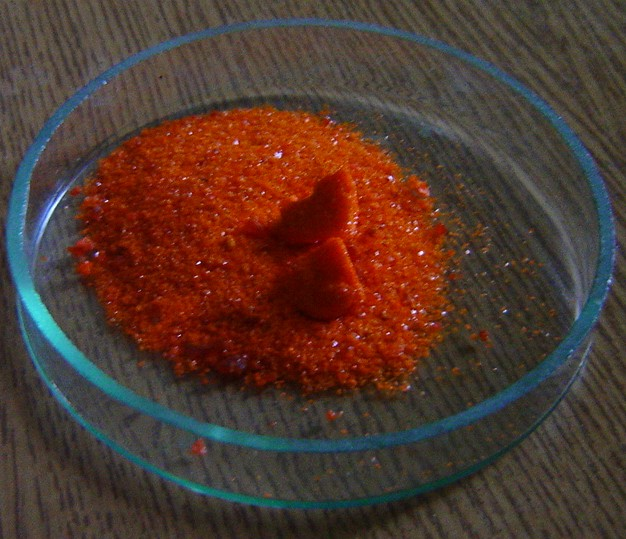

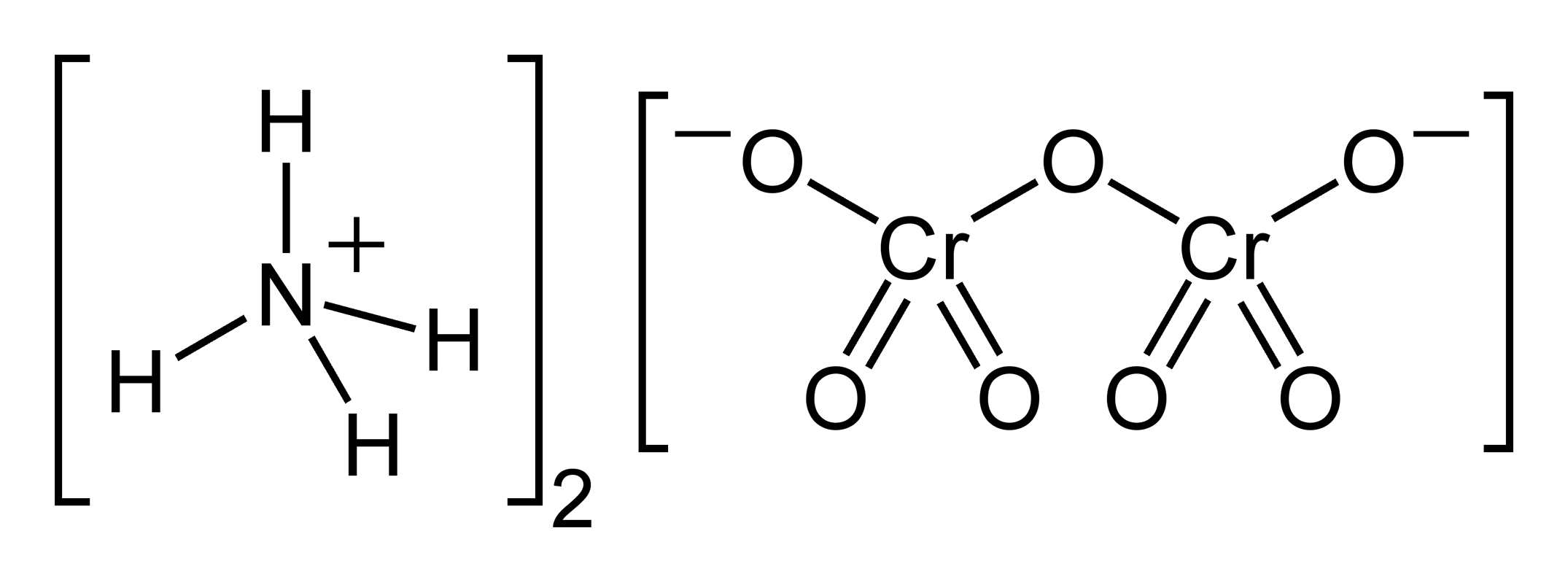

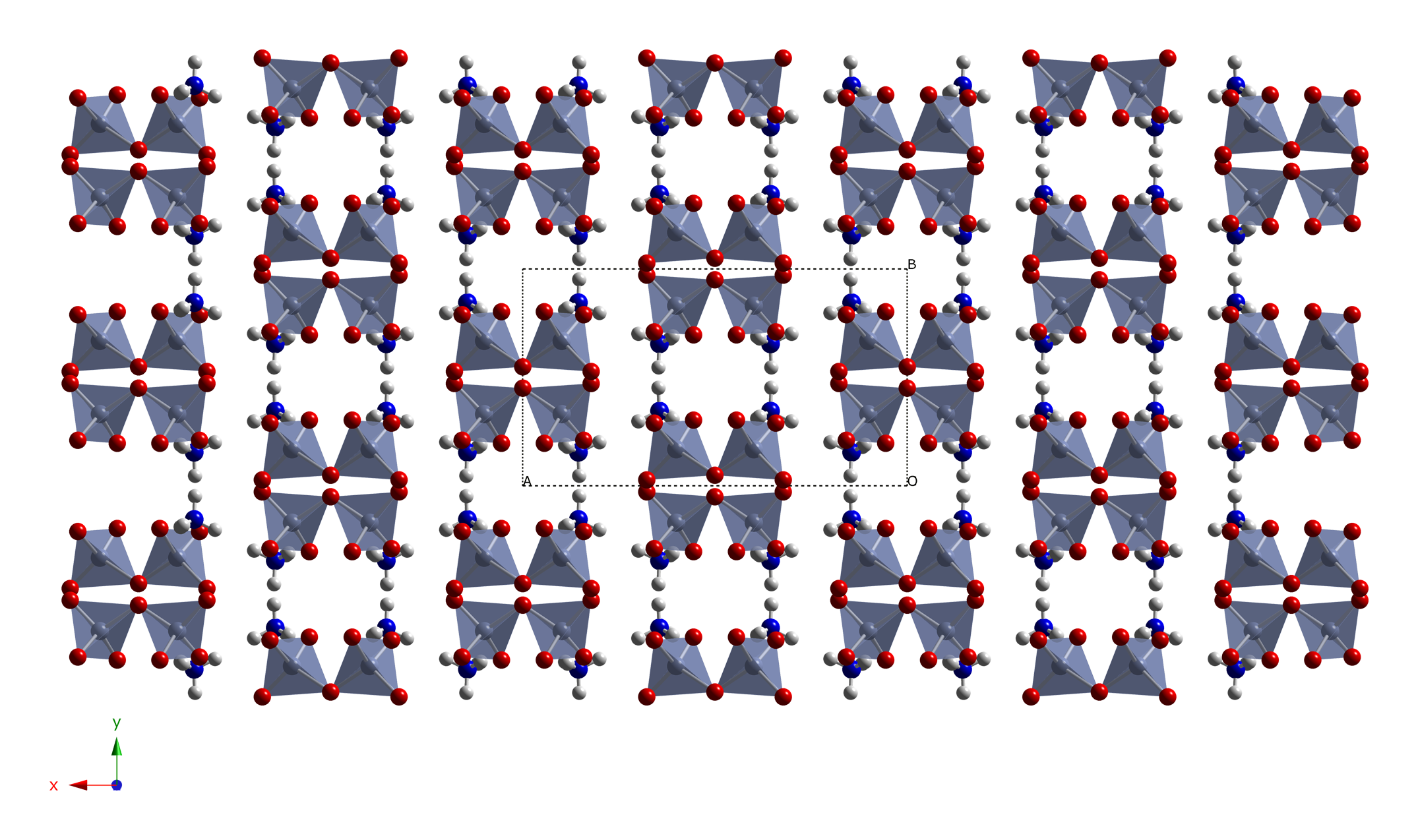

Names
- IUPAC name Ammonium dichromate
- Other names Ammonium bichromate Ammonium pyrochromate

Identifiers
| CAS Number | 7789-09-5 |
| 3D model (JSmol) | Interactive image |
| ChemSpider | 23002 |
| ECHA InfoCard | 100.029.221 |
| PubChem CID | 24600 |
| RTECS number | HX7650000 |
| UNII | 5J18BP595G |
| UN number | 1439 |
| CompTox Dashboard (EPA) | DTXSID70872953 |
- InChI: InChI=1S/2Cr.2H3N.7O/h;;2*1H3;;;;;;;/q;;;;;;;;;2*-1/p+2 Key: JOSWYUNQBRPBDN-UHFFFAOYSA-P; InChI=1/2Cr.2H3N.7O/h;;2*1H3;;;;;;;/q;;;;;;;;;2*-1/p+2/rCr2O7.2H3N/c3-1(4,5)9-2(6,7)8;;/h;2*1H3/q-2;;/p+2 Key: JOSWYUNQBRPBDN-RFRSXZKWAS
- SMILES: [O-][Cr](=O)(=O)O[Cr]([O-])(=O)=O.[NH4+].[NH4+]

Properties
| Chemical formula | (NH_{4})_{2}Cr_{2}O_{7} |
| Molar mass | 252.063 g·mol^{−1} |
| Appearance | Orange-red crystals |
| Odor | odorless |
| Density | 2.150 g/cm^{3} (20 °C (68 °F; 293 K)) |
| Melting point | 170 °C (338 °F; 443 K) decomposes |
| Solubility in water | 18.2 g/100ml (0 °C (32 °F; 273 K)); 35.6 g/100ml (20 °C (68 °F; 293 K)); 40.0 g/100ml (25 °C (77 °F; 298 K)); 156.0 g/100ml (100 °C (212 °F; 373 K)) |
| Solubility in ethanol | soluble |

Structure
| Crystal structure | monoclinic |

Hazards
- GHS labelling
| Pictograms | (GHS03: Oxidizing) (GHS05: Corrosive) (GHS06: Toxic) (GHS08: Health hazard) (GHS09: Environmental hazard) |
| Signal word | Danger |
| Hazard statements | H272, H301, H312, H314, H317, H330, H334, H340, H350, H360, H372, H410 |
| Precautionary statements | P201, P202, P210, P220, P221, P260, P264, P270, P271, P272, P273, P280, P284, P301+P310+P330, P301+P330+P331, P303+P361+P353, P304+P340+P310, P305+P351+P338+P310, P308+P313, P333+P313, P342+P311, P363, P370+P378, P391, P403+P233, P405, P501 |
| NFPA 704 (fire diamond) | 4 1 3 OX |
| Autoignition temperature | 218 °C (424 °F; 491 K) |
| Threshold limit value (TLV) | 0.0002 mg/m^{3} (as Cr(VI)) (TWA), 0.0005 mg/m^{3} (as Cr(VI)) (STEL), 1 mg/10m3 (as CrO_{3}) (C) |
- Lethal dose or concentration (LD, LC)
| LD_{50} (median dose) | 53 mg/kg (Rat, oral); 1860 mg/kg (Rabbit, dermal) |
| LC_{50} (median concentration) | 0.2 mg/L (200 mg/m^{3}) - 4h (Rat, inhalation, dust / mist) |
- NIOSH (US health exposure limits)
| PEL (Permissible) | 0.005 mg/m^{3} (as Cr) |
| REL (Recommended) | 8 hours, 0.0002 mg/m^{3} (as Cr) |
| IDLH (Immediate danger) | 15 mg/m^{3} (as Cr(VI)) |

Related compounds
| Other cations | Sodium dichromate; Potassium dichromate |
- Except where otherwise noted, data are given for materials in their standard state (at 25 °C [77 °F], 100 kPa). verify (what is ?) Infobox references

Ammonium dichromate is an inorganic compound with the formula (NH_{4})_{2}Cr_{2}O_{7}. In this compound, as in all chromates and dichromates, chromium is in a +6 oxidation state, commonly known as hexavalent chromium. It is a salt consisting of ammonium ions and dichromate ions.

Ammonium dichromate is used in demonstrations of tabletop "volcanoes". However, this demonstration has become unpopular due to concerns about the compound's carcinogenic nature. It has been used in pyrotechnics and in the early days of photography. It is also used in holography.

== Properties ==
At standard temperature and pressure, the compound exists as orange, acidic crystals soluble in water and ethanol. It is formed by the action of chromic acid on ammonium hydroxide with subsequent crystallisation.

The (NH_{4})_{2}Cr_{2}O_{7} crystal (C2/c, z = 4) contains a single type of ammonium ion, at sites of symmetry C_{1}(2,3). Each NH^{+}_{4} centre is surrounded irregularly by eight oxygen atoms at N−O distances ranging from ca. 2.83 to 3.17 Å, typical of hydrogen bonds.

== Uses ==
=== Pyrotechnics ===
It has been used in pyrotechnics as part of a conversion coating method for magnesium powder. It may also be used when a dichromate compatible with ammonium perchlorate (NH_{4}ClO_{4}) is needed; potassium dichromate (K_{2}Cr_{2}O_{7}) is commonly used, but reacts with ammonium perchlorate over time to form potassium perchlorate and ammonium dichromate. This mixture occupies 5% more volume than the original K_{2}Cr_{2}O_{7} + NH_{4}ClO_{4} mixture and leads to eventual cracking of stars and consolidated compositions.

It was used in a composition in the early 20th century in a combination firework called a serpent's nest to produce the green grass (or nest) from which a separately made pharaoh's serpent or black snake composition emerged.

=== Holography ===
In holography, it has been used since the 1960s to sensitize dichromated gelatins or other materials on which to expose a hologram. This method has the advantage of being low cost, using relatively common materials, and only requiring isopropyl alcohol for development, but the gelatins created with these methods are sensitive to humidty. Potassium dichromate is also used for this purpose.

=== Other ===
It was used in the early days of photography as well as in lithography, as a source of pure nitrogen in the laboratory, and as a catalyst. It is also used as a mordant for dyeing pigments, in manufacturing of alizarin, chrome alum, leather tanning and oil purification.

Photosensitive films containing PVA, ammonium dichromate, and a phosphor are spin-coated as aqueous slurries in the production of the phosphor raster of television screens and other devices. The ammonium dichromate acts as the photoactive site.

== Reactions ==
=== Thermal decomposition ===
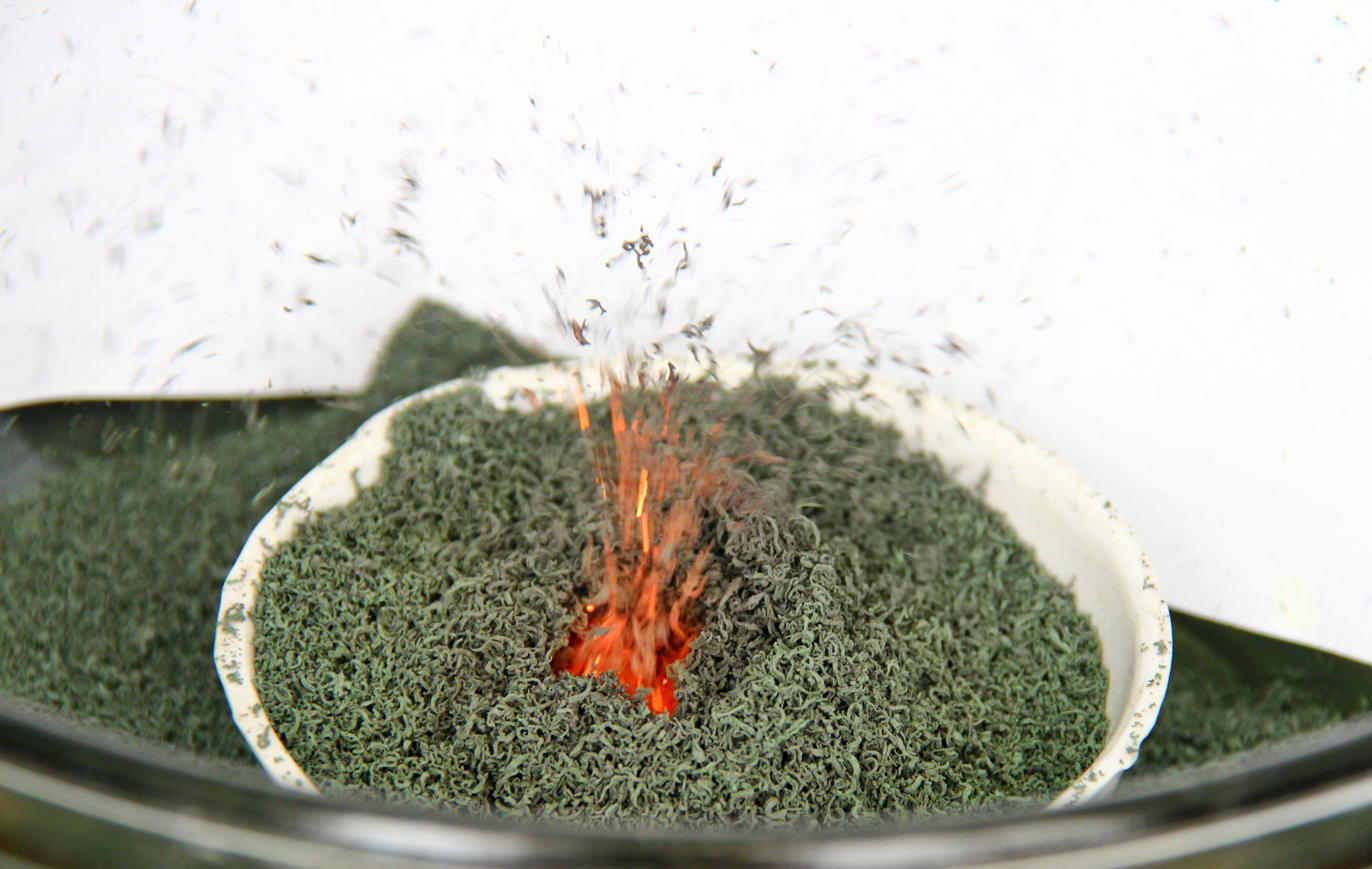
Ammonium dichromate decomposition

A few drops of ethanol are added to a small pile of ammonium dichromate (NH_{4})_{2}Cr_{2}O_{7} and ignited. Sparks are emitted and an ash-like product is formed. The phenomenon resembles the eruption of a volcano. The reaction starts at 180 °C (356 °F), becoming self-sustaining at approximately 225 °C (437 °F).

The thermal decomposition of ammonium dichromate can be demonstrated by igniting a pile of the salt, which initiates the following exothermic conversion:

(NH_{4})_{2}Cr_{2}O_{7}(s) → Cr_{2}O_{3}(s) + N_{2}(g) + 4 H_{2}O(g)
(ΔH = −429.1±3 kcal/mol)

Like ammonium nitrate, it is thermodynamically unstable. Its decomposition reaction produces voluminous dark green powdered chromium(III) oxide. Not all of the ammonium dichromate decomposes in this reaction. When the green powder is added to water a yellow/orange solution is obtained from left over ammonium dichromate.

Observations obtained using microscopy during a kinetic study of the thermal decomposition of ammonium dichromate provided evidence that salt breakdown proceeds with the intervention of an intermediate liquid phase rather than a solid phase. The characteristic darkening of (NH_{4})_{2}Cr_{2}O_{7} crystals as a consequence of the onset of decomposition can be ascribed to the dissociative loss of ammonia accompanied by progressive anion condensation to Cr_{3}O^{2−}_{10}, Cr_{4}O^{2−}_{13}, etc., ultimately yielding CrO_{3}. The CrO_{3} has been identified as a possible molten intermediate participating in (NH_{4})_{2}Cr_{2}O_{7} decomposition.

=== Oxidation ===
Ammonium dichromate is a strong oxidising agent and reacts, often violently, with many reducing agents. In general, the stronger the reducing agent, the more violent the reaction.

== Safety ==
Ammonium dichromate is highly acutely toxic. It ranges from having a strong irritant effect on skin to causing severe chemical burns and skin corrosion. Inhalation of dust may be fatal. Ingestion results in death from multi-organ failure if not treated quickly. Ascorbic acid may be a useful early treatment.

Like many hexavalent chromium compounds it is a proven carcinogen, mutagen, and reproductive toxin.

=== Incidents ===
In sealed containers, ammonium dichromate is likely to explode if heated. In 1986, two workers were killed and 14 others injured at Diamond Shamrock Chemicals in Ashtabula, Ohio, when 2,000 lb (910 kg) of ammonium dichromate exploded as it was being dried in a heater.
