= Magnesium chromate =

Names
- Other names Magnesium chromate(VI); Magnesium monochromate Magnesium monochromate(VI)

Identifiers
| CAS Number | 13423-61-5 |
| 3D model (JSmol) | Interactive image |
| ChemSpider | 55507 |
| ECHA InfoCard | 100.033.204 |
| PubChem CID | 61599 |
| CompTox Dashboard (EPA) | DTXSID50893929 |
- InChI: InChI=1S/Cr.Mg.4O/q;+2;;;2*-1 Key: CRGGPIWCSGOBDN-UHFFFAOYSA-N; InChI=1/Cr.Mg.4O/q;+2;;;2*-1/rCrO4.Mg/c2-1(3,4)5;/q-2;+2 Key: CRGGPIWCSGOBDN-OVNOGNLDAB
- SMILES: [O-][Cr](=O)(=O)[O-].[Mg+2]

Properties
| Chemical formula | MgCrO_{4} |
| Molar mass | 140.297 g·mol^{−1} |
| Appearance | Yellow solid |
| Solubility in water | soluble |

Hazards
- GHS labelling
| Pictograms | (GHS05: Corrosive) (GHS06: Toxic) (GHS07: Exclamation mark) (GHS08: Health hazard) (GHS09: Environmental hazard) |
| Signal word | Danger |
| Hazard statements | H301, H312, H315, H317, H318, H330, H335, H340, H350, H410 |
| Precautionary statements | P203, P260, P264, P264+P265, P270, P271, P272, P273, P280, P284, P301+P316, P302+P352, P304+P340, P305+P354+P338, P316, P317, P318, P319, P320, P321, P330, P333+P317, P362+P364, P391, P403+P233, P405, P501 |
- Except where otherwise noted, data are given for materials in their standard state (at 25 °C [77 °F], 100 kPa). Infobox references

Magnesium chromate is an inorganic compound with the chemical formula MgCrO_{4}. It is a yellow, odorless, water-soluble salt. It is available commercially in a variety of powders, from nanoscale to micron-sized, either as an anhydrous or hydrated form.

== Uses ==
As a hydrate, it is useful as a corrosion inhibitor and pigment.

== History ==
Before 1940, the literature about magnesium chromate and its hydrates was sparse, but studies starting in that year looked at its properties and solubility.

In 2011, an undecahydrate (containing 11 molecules of water) of this compound was discovered.
