= Potassium tetraperoxochromate(V) =

Chemical compound

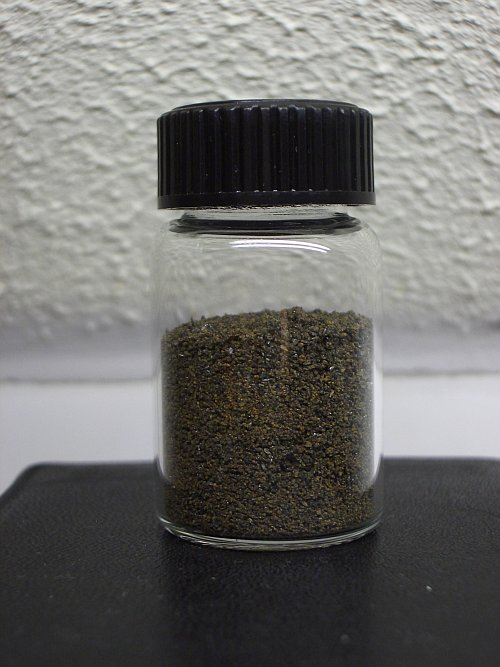

Names
- IUPAC name Potassium tetraperoxochromate(V)
- Other names: Potassium perchromate; Potassium peroxochromate

Identifiers
CAS Number	12331-76-9
3D model (JSmol)	Interactive image
ChemSpider	106513
PubChem CID	139134081
CompTox Dashboard (EPA)	DTXSID5059531
- InChI: InChI=1S/Cr.3K.4O2/c;;;;4*1-2/q+5;3*+1;4*-2 Key: JSURYJVAXIVWCV-UHFFFAOYSA-N
- SMILES: [O-][O-].[O-][O-].[O-][O-].[O-][O-].[K+].[K+].[K+].[Cr+5]

Properties
Chemical formula	K_{3}[Cr(O_{2})_{4}]
Molar mass	297.286 g/mol
Appearance	red-brown crystals
Melting point	70 °C (158 °F; 343 K) (decomposes)
Solubility in water	Poorly soluble (0 °C (32 °F; 273 K)); Reacts (45 °C (113 °F; 318 K))
- Except where otherwise noted, data are given for materials in their standard state (at 25 °C [77 °F], 100 kPa). verify (what is ?) Infobox references

Potassium peroxochromate, potassium tetraperoxochromate(V), or simply potassium perchromate, is an inorganic compound having the chemical formula K_{3}[Cr(O_{2})_{4}]. It is a red-brown paramagnetic solid. It is the potassium salt of tetraperoxochromate(V), one of the few examples of chromium in the +5 oxidation state and one of the rare examples of a complex stabilized only by peroxide ligands. Heating this compound releases singlet oxygen.

== Preparation ==
Potassium peroxochromate is prepared starting from chromium trioxide (CrO_{3}), excess potassium hydroxide (KOH), and 30% hydrogen peroxide (H_{2}O_{2}):

2 KOH + CrO_{3} → K_{2}CrO_{4} + H_{2}O

Hydrogen peroxide is added at temperatures below −5 °C (23 °F; 268 K):

2 K_{2}CrO_{4} + 8 H_{2}O_{2} → 2 K_{2}[Cr(O_{2})_{4}] + 8 H_{2}O

The intermediate tetraperoxochromate(VI) is reduced by hydrogen peroxide, forming tetraperoxochromate(V):

2 K_{2}[Cr(O_{2})_{4}] + 2 KOH → 2 K_{3}[Cr(O_{2})_{4}] + H_{2}O_{2}

Thus, the overall reaction is:

2 K_{2}CrO_{4} + 7 H_{2}O_{2} + 2 KOH → 2 K_{3}[Cr(O_{2})_{4}] + 8 H_{2}O

The compound decomposes spontaneously at higher temperatures but may be stored in sealed containers for extended periods.
