= Barium chromate =

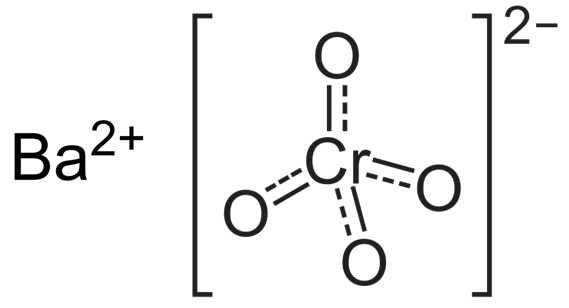

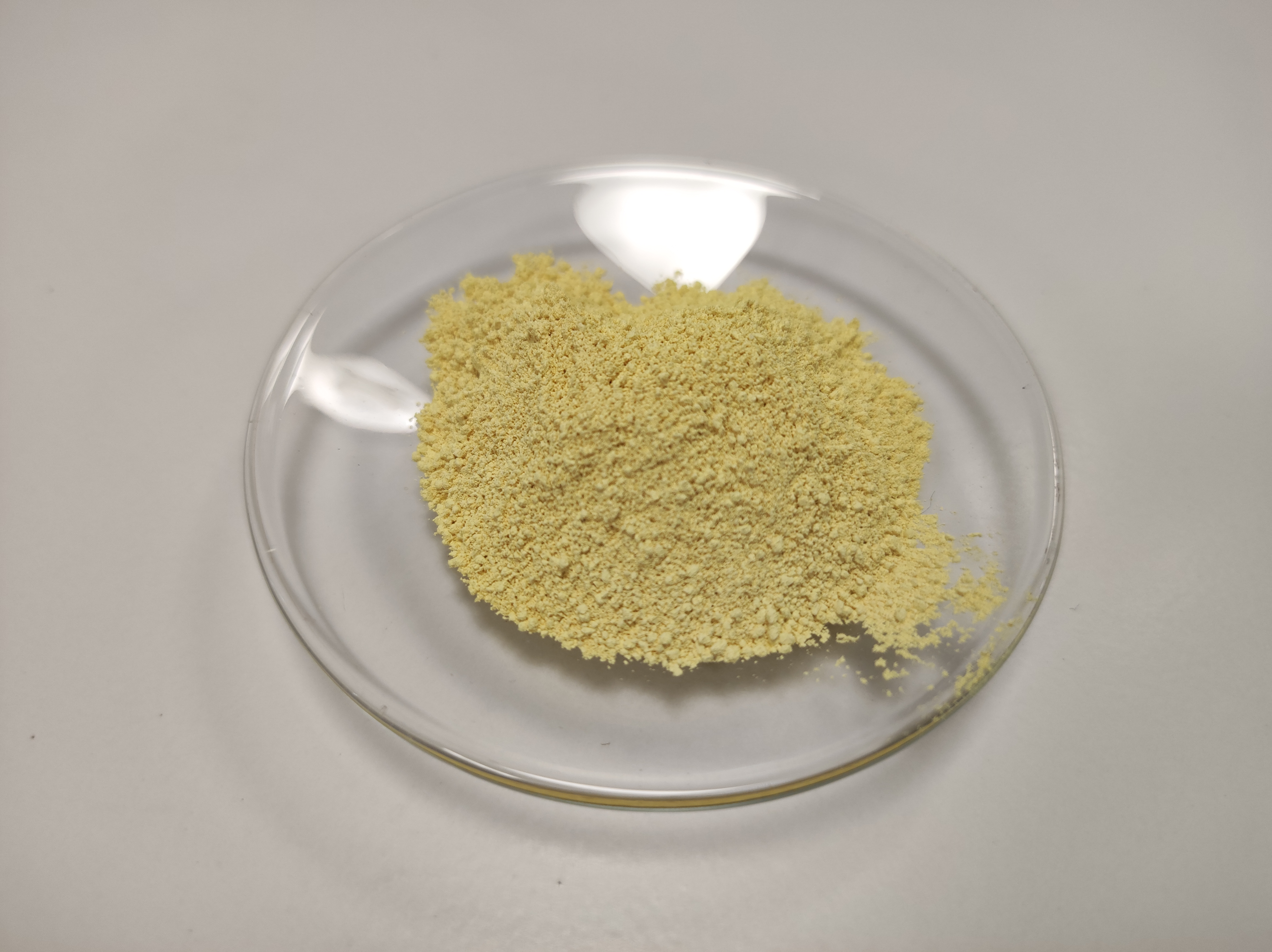

Names
- IUPAC name Barium chromate
- Other names Barium chromate oxide, Chromic acid, (BaCrO4), barium salt (1:1), barium tetraoxochromate(VI)

Identifiers
CAS Number	10294-40-3
3D model (JSmol)	Interactive image
ChemSpider	23481
ECHA InfoCard	100.030.587
EC Number	233-660-5
PubChem CID	25136
RTECS number	CQ876000
UNII	7D7O9CF0IX
UN number	1564
CompTox Dashboard (EPA)	DTXSID1051517
- InChI: InChI=1S/Ba.Cr.4O/q+2;;;;2*-1 Key: QFFVPLLCYGOFPU-UHFFFAOYSA-N; InChI=1/Ba.Cr.4O/q+2;;;;2*-1/rBa.CrO4/c;2-1(3,4)5/q+2;-2 Key: QFFVPLLCYGOFPU-XPTLYTIWAW
- SMILES: [Ba+2].[O-][Cr]([O-])(=O)=O

Properties
Chemical formula	BaCrO_{4}
Molar mass	253.37 g/mol
Appearance	yellow powder, darkens upon heating
Density	4.498 g/cm^{3}
Melting point	210 °C (410 °F; 483 K) (decomposes)
Solubility in water	0.2775 mg/100 mL (20 °C)
Solubility product (K_{sp})	1.17 × 10^{−10}
Solubility	soluble in strong acids

Structure
Crystal structure	orthorhombic

Hazards
- GHS labelling
Pictograms	(GHS03: Oxidizing) (GHS06: Toxic) (GHS07: Exclamation mark) (GHS08: Health hazard) (GHS09: Environmental hazard)
Signal word	Danger
Hazard statements	H272, H301, H302, H317, H332, H350, H410
Precautionary statements	P201, P202, P210, P220, P221, P261, P264, P270, P271, P272, P273, P280, P281, P301+P310, P301+P312, P302+P352, P304+P312, P304+P340, P308+P313, P312, P321, P330, P333+P313, P363, P370+P378, P391, P405, P501
NFPA 704 (fire diamond)	3 0 3
Safety data sheet (SDS)	External MSDS
- Except where otherwise noted, data are given for materials in their standard state (at 25 °C [77 °F], 100 kPa). verify (what is ?) Infobox references

Barium chromate is an inorganic compound with the chemical formula BaCrO_{4}. It is a yellow solid, an oxidizing agent that produces a green flame when heated, a result of the barium ions.

== Properties ==
It is very insoluble in water, but soluble in acids:

2 BaCrO_{4} + 2 H^{+} → 2 Ba^{2+} + Cr_{2}O_{7}^{2−} + H_{2}O K_{sp} = [Ba^{2+}][CrO_{4}^{2−}] = 2.1 × 10^{−10}

== Preparation ==
Barium chromate can be precipitated by reacting a soluble barium salt such as barium hydroxide with a chromate such as potassium chromate:

Ba(OH)_{2} + K_{2}CrO_{4} → BaCrO_{4}↓ + 2 KOH

Single-crystalline ABO_{4} type nanorods can be prepared by template synthesis. Nanoparticles are allowed to grow in the pores of alumina membranes of various sizes. The varying sizes of the pores allow the growth to be controlled and cause the shapes to be reproducible. The alumina is then dissolved, leaving the nanoparticles behind intact. The synthesis can be carried out at room temperature.

== Uses ==
Barium chromate has been found to be useful in many capacities. The compound is often used as a carrier for the chromium ions.

=== Electroplating ===
Barium chromate acts as a sulfate scavenger in chromium electroplating baths. Over time, the chromium concentration of the bath decreases until it is no longer functional. Adding barium chromate improves the lifetime of the bath by increasing the chromic acid concentration.

Barium chromate is used as a corrosion inhibitive pigment on zinc-alloy electroplating surfaces.

=== Oxidizing agent ===
Barium chromate is an oxidizing agent, making it useful as a burn rate modifier in pyrotechnic compositions. It is especially useful in delay compositions such as delay fuses.

=== Pigment ===
Barium has been used to color paints. The pigment known as lemon yellow often contained barium chromate mixed with lead sulfate. Due to its moderate tinting strength lemon yellow was not employed very frequently in oil painting. Pierre-Auguste Renoir and Claude Monet are known to have painted with lemon yellow.

=== Other ===
When mixed with solid fumaric acid, barium chromate can be used in the removal of impurities and residual moisture from dry-cleaning solvents or from petroleum fuels.

Barium chromate is also used in the composition of a catalyst for alkane dehydrogenation.

== Reactions ==
Barium chromate reacts with barium hydroxide in the presence of sodium azide to form barium chromate(V). The reaction releases oxygen and water.

4 BaCrO_{4} + 2 Ba(OH)_{2} $\ce{->[\ce{NaN3}]}$ 2 Ba_{3}(CrO_{4})_{2} + O_{2}↑ + 2 H_{2}O↑

== History ==
The first naturally occurring barium chromate mineral was found in the country of Jordan. The brown crystals found perched on host rocks were named hashemite in honor of the Hashemite Kingdom of Jordan. Hashemite crystals range in color from light yellowish-brown to a darker greenish-brown and are usually less than 1 mm in length.

Hashemite crystals are not composed of pure barium chromate but instead contain some small sulfur content as well. The different crystals contain a range of sulfur impurities ranging from the more pure dark crystals, Ba_{1.00}(Cr_{0.93}, S_{0.07})_{1.00}O_{4}, to the less pure light crystals, Ba_{1.00}(Cr_{0.64}, S_{0.36})_{1.00}O_{4}.

Hashemite was found to be an isostructural chromate analog of baryte, BaSO_{4}.

== Safety ==
Barium chromate is toxic. Chromates, when pulverized and inhaled, are carcinogens.

In 2010, a study was conducted on four hexavalent chromium compounds to test the carcinogenic effects of chromium. The chromium ions accumulate in the bronchial bifurcation sites, settling into the tissue and inducing tumors. It was discovered that barium chromate is both genotoxic and cytotoxic. The cytotoxicity was determined to most likely be a result of the genotoxicity, but the cause of the genotoxicity is yet unknown.

== Further study ==
- Kühn, H. and Curran, M., Strontium, Barium and Calcium Chromates, in Artists' Pigments. A Handbook of Their History and Characteristics, Vol. 1: Feller, R.L. (Ed.) Oxford University Press 1986, p. 205 – 207.
