= Hexavalent chromium =

Chromium in the +6 oxidation state

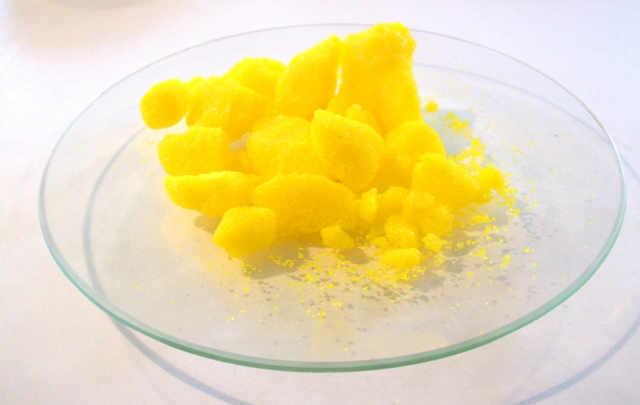
The most common chromium(VI) compound: sodium chromate

Hexavalent chromium (chromium(VI), Cr(VI), chromium 6) is any chemical compound that contains the element chromium in the +6 oxidation state (thus hexavalent). It has been identified as carcinogenic, which is of concern since approximately 136,000 tonnes (150,000 tons) of hexavalent chromium were produced in 1985. Hexavalent chromium compounds can be carcinogens (IARC Group 1), especially if airborne and inhaled where they can cause lung cancer.

== Occurrence and uses ==
Hexavalent chromium occurs only rarely in nature, an exception being crocoite (PbCrO_{4}). It is, however, produced on a large scale industrially. Virtually all chromium ore is processed via the formation of hexavalent chromium, specifically the salt sodium dichromate. Sodium chromate is converted into other hexavalent chromium compounds such as chromium trioxide and various salts of chromate and dichromate.

Industrial uses of hexavalent chromium compounds include chromate pigments in dyes, paints, inks, and plastics; chromates added as anticorrosive agents to paints, primers, and other surface coatings; and chromic acid electroplated onto metal parts to provide a decorative or protective coating.

Hexavalent chromium indeed is one of the more widely used heavy metals in various sectors and industries (metallurgy, chemicals, textiles, etc.) with particular involvement in the metal coating sector, especially when subjected to plating or coating processes involving hexavalent chromium.

Hexavalent chromium can be formed when performing "hot work" such as welding on stainless steel or melting chromium metal. In these situations the chromium is not originally hexavalent, but the high temperatures involved in the process result in oxidation that converts the chromium to a hexavalent state. Hexavalent chromium can also be found in drinking water and public water systems.

== Toxicity ==
Many hexavalent chromium compounds can be carcinogens (IARC Group 1), especially if airborne and inhaled where they can cause lung cancer. Positive associations have also been observed between exposure to chromium(VI) compounds and cancer of the nose and nasal sinuses. Workers in many occupations are exposed to hexavalent chromium. Problematic exposure is known to occur among workers who handle chromate-containing products and those who grind or weld stainless steel. Workers who are exposed to hexavalent chromium are at increased risk of developing lung cancer, asthma, or damage to the nasal epithelia and skin. Within the European Union, the use of hexavalent chromium in electronic equipment is largely prohibited by the Restriction of Hazardous Substances Directive and the European Union regulation on Registration, Evaluation, Authorisation and Restriction of Chemicals.

Hexavalent chromium compounds can be genotoxic carcinogens. Due to its structural similarity to sulfate, chromate (a typical form of chromium(VI) at neutral pH) is transported into cells via sulfate channels. Inside the cell, hexavalent chromium(VI) is reduced first to pentavalent chromium(V) then to trivalent chromium(III) without the aid of any enzymes. The reduction occurs via direct electron transfer primarily from ascorbate and some nonprotein thiols. Vitamin C and other reducing agents combine with chromate to give chromium(III) products inside the cell. The resultant chromium(III) forms stable complexes with nucleic acids and proteins. This causes strand breaks and Cr–DNA adducts which are responsible for mutagenic damage. According to Shi et al., the DNA can also be damaged by hydroxyl radicals produced during reoxidation of pentavalent chromium by hydrogen peroxide molecules present in the cell, which can cause double-strand breakage.

Both insoluble salts of lead and barium chromates as well as soluble chromates were negative in the implantation model of lung carcinogenesis. Yet, soluble chromates are a confirmed carcinogen so it would be prudent to consider all chromates carcinogenic.

The LD50 of lead chromate is 5 g/kg (oral, rats). This low toxicity is attributed to its extremely low solubility. Consequently lead chromate remains a common, even preferred, pigment.

Chronic inhalation from occupational exposures increases the risk of respiratory cancers. The most common form of lung malignancies in chromate workers is squamous cell carcinoma. Ingestion of chromium(VI) through drinking water has been found to cause cancer in the oral cavity and small intestine. It can also cause irritation or ulcers in the stomach and intestines, and toxicity in the liver. Liver toxicity shows the body's apparent inability to detoxify chromium(VI) in the GI tract where it can then enter the circulatory system.

Of 2,345 unsafe products in 2015 listed by the EU Commission for Justice, Consumers and Gender Equality some 64% came from China, and 23% were clothing articles, including leather goods (and shoes) contaminated with hexavalent chromium. Chromate-dyed textiles or chromate-tanned leather shoes can cause skin sensitivity.

In the U.S., the OSHA PEL for airborne exposures to hexavalent chromium is 5 μg/m^{3}. The U.S. National Institute for Occupational Safety and Health proposed a REL of 0.2 μg/m^{3} for airborne exposures to hexavalent chromium.

Based on the findings of the National Toxicology Program (NTP)—which is headquartered in the National Institute of Environmental Health Sciences (NIEHS)—in 2014, California established a state-wide drinking water standard of 10 parts per billion (ppb)—micrograms per liter (MCL) of 10 ppb—"specifically for hexavalent chromium, not total chromium."

For drinking water, the United States Environmental Protection Agency (EPA) does not have a Maximum Contaminant Level (MCL) for hexavalent chromium.

== Remediation of hexavalent chromium in water ==
The removal of hexavalent chromium from aqueous solutions can be achieved in several ways. The more practical methods focus on reduction of Cr(VI) to Cr(III). Biological agents have also been investigated to see if they are capable of reducing Cr(VI). Experiments with activated sludge have also shown its ability to reduce Cr(VI) to Cr(III).

== Exposure and safety issues ==
=== Australia ===
==== Kooragang Island, New South Wales ====
Hexavalent chromium was released from the Newcastle Orica Kooragang Island ammonium nitrate plant on August 8, 2011. The incident occurred when the plant entered the 'start up' phase after the completion of a five-yearly maintenance overhaul. The process of converting the High Temperature Shift catalyst to its active (reduced) form began by passing steam through the catalyst bed to heat it, to be discharged from the SP8 vent stack. At this time lower temperatures in parts of the plant led some of the steam to condense, which caused chromium(VI) from the catalyst bed to dissolve into the liquid present. The amount of condensate overwhelmed the drainage arrangements, resulting in the emission of condensate through the SP8 vent stack. The leak went undetected for 30 minutes, releasing 200 kg of chromium(VI) into the atmosphere and exposing up to 20 workers at the plant and 70 nearby homes in Stockton.

The town was not notified of the exposure until three days later on the Wednesday morning. This sparked a major public controversy, with Orica criticized for playing down the extent and possible risks of the leak. The office of Environment and Heritage in Stockton collected 71 samples. Low levels of chromium were detected in 11 of them. These 11 samples were taken within six residential blocks close to the Orica plant, two of which were from water samples collected immediately south of the six block area.

The Select Committee on the Kooragang Island Orica Chemical Leak released their report on the incident in February 2012. They found Orica's approach to addressing the leak's impact was grossly inadequate. Orica failed to realize the potential impact that prevailing winds would have on an emission 60 meters high. Orica failed to inspect the area immediately downwind and notify the Office of Environment and Heritage until August 9, 2011. In Orica's initial report to the Office of Environment and Heritage they failed to disclose that the emissions had escaped off-site. In the initial report to WorkCover Orica did not disclose potential impacts on workers as well as that the substance emitted was chromium(VI). Orica's Emergency Response plan was not well understood by employees particularly about notification procedures. The original notification of residents in Stockton was only to households immediately downwind of the emission which failed to realize the potential for contamination of the surrounding area as well. The information presented at the original notification downplayed potential health risks and subsequently provided incomplete information and has led to a lack of trust between Stockton residents and Orica officials.

In 2014, Orica pleaded guilty to nine charges before the Land and Environment court and was fined $768,000. NSW Health findings ruled that it is very unlikely that anyone in Stockton would later develop cancer as a result of the incident.

=== Bangladesh ===
Toxic poultry feed contaminated by chromium-based leather tanning waste products (as opposed to the non-toxic process of vegetable tanned leather) has been shown to have entered the food supply in Bangladesh through chicken meat, the most common source of protein in the country. Tanneries in Hazaribagh Thana, an industrial neighborhood of Dhaka, emit around 21,600 cubic metres (760,000 cu ft) of toxic waste each day, and generate as much as 100 tonnes (110 tons) per day of scraps, trimmed raw hide, flesh and fat, which are processed into feed by neighborhood recycling plants and used in chicken and fish farms across the country. Chromium levels ranging from 350–4,520 micrograms (0.35–4.52 mg) per kilogram were found in different organs of chickens which had been fed the tannery-scraps feed for two months, according to Abul Hossain, a chemistry professor at the University of Dhaka. The 2014 study estimated up to 25% of the chickens in Bangladesh contained harmful levels of chromium(VI).

=== Greece ===
==== Eastern Central Greece ====
The chemistry of the groundwater in eastern Central Greece (central Euboea and the Asopos valley) revealed high concentrations of hexavalent chromium in groundwater systems sometimes exceeding the Greek and the EU drinking water maximum acceptable level for total chromium. Hexavalent chromium pollution in Greece is associated with industrial waste.

By using the GFAAS for total chromium, diphenylcarbazide-Cr(VI) complex colorimetric method for hexavalent chromium, and flame-AAS and ICP-MS for other toxic elements, their concentrations were investigated in several groundwater samples. The contamination of water by hexavalent chromium in central Euboea is mainly linked to natural processes, but there are anthropogenic cases.

==== Thebes–Tanagra–Malakasa (Asopos) basin ====
In the Thebes–Tanagra–Malakasa basin of Eastern Central Greece, an area that supports many industrial activities, concentrations of chromium (up to 80 μg/L (0.0056 gr/imp gal) Cr(VI)) and Inofyta (up to 53 μg/L (0.0037 gr/imp gal) Cr(VI) were found in the urban water supply of Oropos). Chromium(VI) concentrations ranging from 5–33 μg/L (0.00035–0.00232 gr/imp gal) Cr(VI) were found in groundwater that is used for Thiva's water supply. Arsenic concentrations up to 34 μg/L (0.0024 gr/imp gal) along with chromium(VI) levels up to 40 μg/L (0.0028 gr/imp gal) were detected in Schimatari's water supply.

In the Asopos River, total chromium values were up to 13 μg/L (0.00091 gr/imp gal), hexavalent chromium was less than 5 μg/L (0.00035 gr/imp gal), with other toxic elements relatively low.

=== Iraq ===
In 2008, defense contractor KBR was alleged to have exposed 16 members of the Indiana National Guard, as well as its own workers, to hexavalent chromium at the Qarmat Ali water treatment facility in Iraq in 2003. Later, 433 members of the Oregon National Guard's 162nd Infantry Battalion were informed of possible exposure to hexavalent chromium while escorting KBR contractors.

One of the National Guard soldiers, David Moore, died in February 2008. The cause was lung disease at age 42. His death was ruled service-related. His brother believes it was hexavalent chromium. On November 2, 2012, a Portland, Oregon jury found KBR negligent in knowingly exposing twelve National Guard soldiers to hexavalent chromium while working at the Qarmat Ali water treatment facility and awarded damages of $85 million to the plaintiffs.

=== United States ===
==== History of the EPA's chromium policies in the United States ====
Prior to 1970, the federal government had limited reach in monitoring and enforcing environmental regulations. Local governments were tasked with environmental monitoring and regulations, such as the monitoring of heavy metals in wastewater. Examples of this can be seen in larger municipalities, such as: Chicago, Los Angeles, and New York. A specific example was in 1969, when the Chicago Metropolitan Sanitary District imposed regulations on factories that were identified as having large amounts of heavy metal discharge.

On December 2, 1970, the Environmental Protection Agency (EPA) was formed. With the formation of the EPA, the federal government had the funds and the oversight to influence major environmental changes. Following the formation of the EPA, the United States saw groundbreaking legislations, such as the Clean Water Act (1972) and the Safe Drinking Water Act (1974).

The Federal Water Pollution Control Act (FWPCA) of 1948 was amended in 1972 to what is more commonly known as the Clean Water Act (CWA). The subsequent amendments provided a basis for the federal government to begin regulating pollutants, implementing wastewater standards, and increasing funding for water treatment facilities among other things. Two years later in 1974, the Safe Drinking Water Act (SDWA) was passed by congress. The SDWA aimed to monitor and protect the United States' drinking water, and the water sources it is drawn from.

In 1991, as part of the SDWA, the EPA placed chromium under its list of maximum contaminant level goals (MCLG), to have a maximum contaminant level (MCL) of 100 ppb. In 1996, the SDWA was amended to include a provision known as the Unregulated Contaminant Monitoring Rule (UCMR). Under this rule, the EPA issues a list of 30 or less contaminants that are not normally regulated under the SDWA. Chromium was monitored under the third UCMR, from January 2013 through December 2015. The EPA uses data from these reports to assist in making regulatory decisions.

==== Current policies in the United States ====
The current EPA standard in measuring chromium is in reference to total chromium, both trivalent and hexavalent. Often, trivalent and hexavalent chromium are mentioned together, when in fact, each possess vastly different properties. At the risk of impacting public health, distinctions between the two chromiums must be clearly made in any publication containing information about chromium. These delineations are critical, as hexavalent chromium is carcinogenic, whereas trivalent chromium is not.

In 1991, the MCL for chromium exposure was set based on potential of "adverse dermatological effects" related to long-term chromium exposure. Chromium's MCL of 100 ppb has not changed since its 1991 recommendation. In 1998, the EPA released a toxicological review of hexavalent chromium. This report examined current literature, at the time, and came to the conclusion that chromium was associated with various health issues. As of 2012, "no federal or state laws restrict the carcinogen's presence in drinking water," according to the Natural Resources Defense Council (NRDC).

In December 2013, the NRDC won a lawsuit against the California Department of Public Health, and the state was required to issue a standard on the maximum contaminant level (MCL) for chromium by "no later than June 15, 2014." The MCL was added to the California Code of Regulations but, in 2017, another court ruled that the standard must be eliminated because the California Department of Public Health had not proven that the standard was economically feasible.

Before the EPA can adjust the policy on chromium levels in drinking water, they have to release a final human health assessment. The EPA mentions two specific documents that are currently under review to determine whether or not to adjust the current drinking water standard for chromium. The first study the EPA mentioned that is under review is a 2008 study conducted by the Department of Health and Human Services National Toxicology Program. This study looks at chronic oral exposure of hexavalent chromium in rats, and its association with cancer. The other study mentioned is a human health assessment of chromium, titled Toxicological Review of Hexavalent Chromium. The final human health assessment is currently in the stage of draft development. This stage is the first of seven. The EPA gives no forecast to when the review will be finalized, and if a decision will be made.

==== Military applications ====
Since World War II, the United States Army relied on hexavalent chromium compounds to protect its vehicles, equipment, aviation and missile systems from corrosion. The wash primer was sprayed as a pretreatment and protective layer on bare metal.

From 2012 to 2015, Army Research Laboratory conducted research on a wash primer replacement, as a part of the DoD's effort to eliminate the use of toxic wash primers in the military. Studies indicated that the wash primers contained hazardous air pollutants, and high levels of volatile organic compounds.

The project resulted in the ARL qualifying three wash primer alternatives in 2015 for use on Army depots, installations, and repair facilities. The research led to the removal of chromate products from Army facilities in 2017.

For their efforts on the wash primer replacement, the ARL researchers won the Secretary of the Army's "Award for Environmental Excellence in Weapon System Acquisition" for the 2016 fiscal year.

==== California ====
===== Davenport =====
Monterey Bay Unified Air Pollution Control District monitored airborne levels of hexavalent chromium at an elementary school and fire department, as well as the point-source. They concluded that there were high levels of hexavalent chromium in the air, originating from a local cement plant, called Cemex. The levels of hexavalent chromium were 8 to 10 times higher than the air district's acceptable level at Pacific Elementary School and the Davenport Fire Department. The County of Santa Cruz sought help of the Health Services Agency (HSA) to investigate the findings of the Air District's report. Cemex voluntarily ceased operations due to the growing concern within the community, while additional air samples were analyzed. The HSA worked with Cemex to implement engineering controls, such as dust scavenging systems and other dust mitigation procedures. Cemex also made a change in the materials they used, trying to replace current materials with materials lower in chromium. The HSA also monitored the surrounding schools to determine if there were any health risks. Most schools came back with low levels, but in the case of higher levels a contractor was hired to clean up the chromium deposits. This case highlights the previously unrecognized possibility that hexavalent chromium can be released from cement-making.

Pacific Palisades

After the Palisades Fire in southern california, in January 2025, researchers found that the fires had released high levels of hexavalent chromium.

===== Paramount =====
In 2016, air quality officials began investigating elevated levels of hexavalent chromium in Paramount, California. The city of Paramount created an action project that included more code enforcement to aid AQMD inspectors and the launch of ParamountEnvironment.org to keep the public informed. Over time, efforts by SCAQMD and the city of Paramount have been effective lowering emissions to acceptable levels.

===== Hinkley =====
Hexavalent chromium was found in drinking water in the southern California town of Hinkley and was brought to popular attention by the involvement of Erin Brockovich and Attorney Edward Masry. The source of contamination was from the evaporating ponds of a PG&E (Pacific Gas and Electric) natural gas pipeline compressor station about 2 miles southeast of Hinkley. Between 1952 and 1966, chromium(VI) was used to prevent corrosion in the cooling stacks. The wastewater was dumped into the unlined evaporating ponds, and the chromium(VI) leaked into the groundwater. The 580 ppb chromium(VI) in the groundwater in Hinkley exceeded the 100-ppb total chromium maximum contaminant level (MCL) set by the United States Environmental Protection Agency (EPA). It also exceeded the California MCL of 50 ppb (as of November 2008) for all types of chromium. California first established an MCL specifically for hexavalent chromium in 2014, set at 10 ppb; prior to that only total chromium standards applied.

A later study found that from 1996 to 2008, 196 cancers were identified among residents of the census tract that included Hinkley—a slightly lower number than the 224 cancers that would have been expected given its demographic characteristics. This finding conflicted with the conclusions reached by the EPA and California's Department of Public Health that chromium(VI) does in fact cause cancer, as explained in a 2013 Center for Public Integrity article published in Mother Jones, critically evaluating that and other studies by researcher John Morgan.

When a PG&E background study of chromium(VI) was conducted, average chromium(VI) levels in Hinkley were recorded as 1.19 ppb with a peak of 3.09 ppb. PG&E's Topock compressor station averaged 7.8 ppb and peaked at 31.8 ppb. The California MCL standard was still 50 ppb at the completion of this background study. The Office of Environmental Health Hazard Assessment (OEHHA) of the California EPA proposed in 2009 a health goal of 0.06 ppb of chromium(VI) in drinking water. In 2010, Brockovich returned to Hinkley in the midst of claims that the plume was spreading despite PG&E's cleanup activities. PG&E continues to provide bottled water for Hinkley residents, as well as offering to buy their homes. All other ongoing cleanup documentation is maintained at California EPA's page.

==== Illinois ====
In Chicago's first ever testing for the toxic metal contaminant, results show that the city's local drinking water contains levels of hexavalent chromium more than 11 times higher than the health standard set in California in July 2011. The results of the test showed that the water which is sent to over 7 million residents had average levels of 0.23 ppb of the toxic metal. California's Office of Environmental Health Hazard Assessment designated the nation's new "public health goal" limit as 0.02 ppb. Echoing their counterparts in other cities where the metal has been detected, Chicago officials stress that local tap water is safe and suggest that if a national limit is adopted, it likely would be less stringent than California's goal. The Illinois Environmental Protection Agency (Illinois EPA) has developed a chromium(VI) strategic plan which outlines tasks in order to reduce the levels of chromium(VI) in Illinois' drinking water. One of which is to work with the U.S. EPA to provide significant technical assistance to the City of Chicago to ensure they quickly develop an effective chromium(VI) specific monitoring program that makes use of the U.S. EPA-approved methods.

==== Massachusetts ====
Cambridge Plating Company, now known as Purecoat North, was an electroplating business in Belmont, Massachusetts. A report was conducted by the Agency for Toxic Substances and Disease Registry (ATSDR), to evaluate the association between environmental exposures from the Cambridge Plating Company and health effects on the surrounding community. The report indicated that residents of Belmont were exposed to chromium via air emissions, as well as groundwater and soil. However, six types of cancer were evaluated, and the incidence was actually found to be average, in most cases, across all types, if not a little bit lower than average. For example, in kidney cancer the number of observed cases was 7 versus an expected 16. While that was the case for most diseases, it was not for all. The incidence of leukemia among females was elevated in Belmont, MA during 1982–1999 (32 diagnoses observed vs. 23.2 expected). Elevations in females were due to four excess cases in each time period (11 diagnoses observed vs. 6.9 expected during 1988–1993; 13 diagnoses observed vs. 8.7 expected during 1994–1999) while elevations among males were based on one to three excess cases. ATSDR deemed Cambridge Plating as an Indeterminate Public Health Hazard in the past, but No Apparent Public Health Hazard in the present or future.

==== Missouri ====
In 2009, a lawsuit was filed against Prime Tanning Corporation of St. Joseph, Missouri, over alleged hexavalent chromium contamination in Cameron, Missouri. A cluster of brain tumors had developed in the town that was above average for the population size of the town. The lawsuit alleges that the tumors were caused by waste hexavalent chromium that had been distributed to local farmers as free fertilizer. In 2010 a government study found hexavalent chromium within the soil but not at levels that were hazardous to human health. In 2012, the case ruled that $10 million would be distributed to over a dozen farmers affected in the northwest Missouri area. The Tanning Corporation still denies that their fertilizer caused any harm. Some residents claim that the tumors were a direct cause from the chromium exposure, but it is difficult to determine what other future impacts might arise from exposure in the specific Missouri counties.

==== Michigan ====
On December 20, 2019, a green substance leaking onto I-696, in Madison Heights, was identified as hexavalent chromium that had leaked from a basement of a local company, Electro-Plating Services.

In July 2022, an employee at the automotive supply company Tribar Technologies overrode alarms, leading to the release of hexavalent chromium into the Wixom wastewater system. The state of Michigan issued a no-contact order with Huron River water near the spill, but this order was lifted after revised estimates concluded that less than 20 pounds of chromium had reached the river.

==== Texas ====
On April 8, 2009, the Texas Commission on Environmental Quality (TCEQ) collected ground water samples from a domestic well on West County Road 112 in Midland, Texas (U.S.), in response to a resident complaint of yellow water. The well was found to be contaminated with chromium(VI). The Midland groundwater reached higher levels of contamination than the EPA mandated maximum contaminant level (MCL) of 100 parts per billion. The current groundwater plume of chromium lies under approximately 260 acres of land at the West County Road 112 Groundwater Site. In response, the TCEQ installed filtration systems on water-well sites that showed contamination of chromium.

As of 2016, TCEQ had sampled water from 235 wells and has installed over 45 anion-exchange filtration systems from this site determined to be centered at 2601 West County Road 112, Midland, Texas. The TCEQ continues to sample wells surrounding the area to monitor the movement of the plume. In addition, they continue to monitor the effectiveness of the anion-exchange filtration systems by sampling on a year-quarterly and the filters are maintained at no cost to the residents.

As of March 2011, the West County Road 112 Ground Water site was added to the National Priorities List (NPL) also known as the Superfund List by the U.S. Environmental Protection Agency (EPA). From 2011 to 2013, TCEQ installed groundwater monitors and conducted groundwater sampling. In 2013, TCEQ began sampling residential soil and confirmed that it was contaminated from use of the contaminated groundwater for garden and lawn care.

According to the EPA, ongoing investigations have not concluded the source of the contamination and cleanup solutions are still being developed. Until such investigations are complete and remediation established, residents will continue to be at risk for health effects from exposure to the groundwater contamination.

==== Wisconsin ====
On January 7, 2011, it was announced that Milwaukee, Wisconsin had tested its water and hexavalent chromium was found to be present. Officials stated that it was in such small quantities that it was nothing to worry about, although this contaminant is a carcinogen. In Wisconsin, Milwaukee's average chromium(VI) level is 0.194 parts per billion (the EPA recommended maximum contaminant level (MCL) is 100 ppb). All 13 water systems tested positive for chromium(VI). Four out of seven systems detected the chemical in Waukesha County, and both Racine and Kenosha Counties had the highest levels averaging more than 0.2 parts per billion. Further testing was being conducted as of 2011. There was no further information available as of October 2016.

=== India ===
Several cases of Hexavalent Chromium have been reported in the country of India, such as Nashik and Ghaziabad. This has mainly occurred due to poorly managed industrial waste.

==== Nashik ====
As of 2026, Nashik has been hit with a severe case of hexavalent chromium. Nashik's groundwater in Datta Nagar has turned bright yellow in color. Several sources cite that Nashik's groundwater is over 1000 times the acceptable limit of hexavalent chromium (Acceptable limit being 0.05mg/l). As of October 2026, 109 people have been diagnosed with skin ailments, while there are also 2 cases of miscarriage.. Therefore, the Maharashtra Pollution Control Board (MPCB) and the MIDC have served closure notices to 15 factories in the area.

== See also ==
- California Proposition 65 (1986)
