= List of alchemical substances =

Alchemy studies produced a number of substances, which were later classified as particular chemical compounds or mixture of compounds.

Many of these terms were in common use into the 20th century.

== Metals and metalloids ==
- Antimony/Stibnium – Sb
- Bismuth (German: Wismuth) – Bi
- Copper/Cuprum – associated with Venus. Cu
- Gold/Aurum – associated with the Sun. Au
- Iron/Ferrum – associated with Mars. Fe
- Lead/Plumbum – associated with Saturn. Pb
- Quicksilver/Hydrargyrum – associated with Mercury. Hg
- Silver/Argentum – associated with the Moon. Ag
- Tin/Stannum – associated with Jupiter. Sn

== Minerals, Stones, and Pigments ==
- Bluestone – Mineral form of Copper(II) Sulfate Pentahydrate, also called Blue Vitriol.
- Borax – Sodium Borate; was also used to refer to other related minerals.
- Cadmia/Tuttia/Tutty – Probably Zinc Carbonate.
- Calamine – Zinc Carbonate.
- Calomel/Horn Quicksilver/Horn Mercury – Mercury(I) Chloride, a very poisonous purgative formed by subliming a mixture of Mercuric Chloride and Metallic Mercury, triturated in a mortar and heated in an Iron pot. The crust formed on the lid was ground to powder and boiled with water to remove the Calomel.
- Calx – Calcium Oxide; was also used to refer to other metal oxides.
- Chalcanthum – The residue produced by strongly roasting Blue Vitriol (Copper Sulfate); it is composed mostly of Cupric Oxide.
- Chalk – A rock composed of porous biogenic Calcium Carbonate, CaCO_{3}
- Chrome green – Chromic Oxide and Cobalt Oxide.
- Chrome Orange – Chrome Yellow and Chrome Red.
- Chrome Red – Basic Lead Chromate – PbCrO_{4}+PbO
- Chrome Yellow/Paris Yellow/Leipzig Yellow– Lead Chromate, PbCrO_{4}
- Cinnabar/vermilion – Refers to several substances, among them: Mercury(II) Sulfide (HgS), or native Vermilion (the common ore of Mercury).
- Copper Glance – Copper(I) Sulfide ore.
- Cuprite – Copper(I) Oxide ore.
- Dutch White – A pigment formed from one part of White Lead to three of Barium Sulfate. BaSO_{4}
- Flowers of Antimony – Antimony Trioxide, formed by roasting Stibnite at high temperature and condensing the white fumes that form Sb_{2}O_{3}.
- Fool's Gold – A mineral, Iron Disulfide or Pyrite; can form Oil of Vitriol on contact with water and air.
- Fulminating Silver – Principally, Silver Nitride, formed by dissolving Silver(I) Oxide in ammonia. Very explosive when dry.
- Fulminating Gold – A number of gold based explosives which "fulminate", or detonate easily.
  - Gold Hydrazide, formed by adding ammonia to the Auric Hydroxide. When dry, can explode on concussion.
  - An unstable Gold Carbonate formed by precipitation by potash from Gold dissolved in Aqua Regia.
- Galena – Lead(II) Sulfide, Lead ore.
- Glass of Antimony – Impure Antimony Tetroxide, Sb_{2}O_{4} formed by roasting stibnite. A yellow pigment for glass and porcelain.
- Gypsum – a mineral; calcium sulfate. CaSO_{4}
- Horn silver/argentum cornu – a weathered form of chlorargyrite, an ore of silver chloride.

- Luna cornea – silver chloride, formed by heating horn silver till it liquefies and then cooling.

- King's yellow – formed by mixing orpiment with white arsenic.
- Lapis solaris (Bologna stone) – barium sulfide – 1603, Vincenzo Cascariolo.
- Lead fume – lead oxide, found in flues at lead smelters.
- Lime/quicklime (burnt lime)/calx viva/unslaked lime – calcium oxide, formed by calcining limestone

- Slaked lime – calcium hydroxide. Ca(OH)_{2}

- Marcasite – a mineral; iron disulfide. In moist air it turns into green vitriol, FeSO_{4}.
- Massicot – lead monoxide. PbO

- Litharge – lead monoxide, formed by fusing and powdering massicot.
- Minium/red lead – trilead tetroxide, Pb_{3}O_{4}; formed by roasting litharge in air.
- Naples yellow/cassel yellow – oxychloride of lead, formed by heating litharge with sal ammoniac.

- Mercurius praecipitatus – red mercuric oxide.
- Mosaic gold – stannic sulfide, formed by heating a mixture of tin filings, sulfur, and sal-ammoniac.
- Orpiment – arsenic trisulfide, an ore of arsenic.
- Pearl white – bismuth nitrate, BiNO_{3}
- Philosophers' wool/nix alba (white snow)/Zinc White – zinc oxide, formed by burning zinc in air, used as a pigment
- Plumbago – a mineral, graphite; not discovered in pure form until 1564
- Powder of Algaroth – antimony oxychloride, formed by precipitation when a solution of butter of antimony and spirit of salt is poured into water.
- Purple of Cassius – formed by precipitating a mixture of gold, stannous and stannic chlorides, with alkali. Used for glass coloring
- Realgar – arsenic disulfide, an ore of arsenic.
- Regulus of antimony
- Resin of copper – copper(I) chloride (cuprous chloride), formed by heating copper with corrosive sublimate.
- Rouge/crocus/colcothar – ferric oxide, formed by burning green vitriol in air.
- Stibnite – antimony or antimony trisulfide, ore of antimony.
- Turpeth mineral – hydrolysed form of mercury(II) sulfate.
- Verdigris – Carbonate of Copper or (more recently) copper(II) acetate. The carbonate is formed by weathering copper. The acetate is formed by vinegar acting on copper. One version was used as a green pigment.
- White arsenic – arsenious oxide, formed by sublimating arsenical soot from the roasting ovens.
- White lead – carbonate of lead, a toxic pigment, produced by corroding stacks of lead plates with dilute vinegar beneath a heap of moistened wood shavings. (replaced by blanc fixe & lithopone)
- Venetian white – formed from equal parts of white lead and barium sulfate.
- Zaffre – impure cobalt arsenate, formed after roasting cobalt ore.
- Zinc blende – zinc sulfide.

== Salts ==
- Glauber's salt – sodium sulfate. Na_{2}SO_{4}
- Sal alembroth – salt composed of chlorides of ammonium and mercury.
- Sal ammoniac – ammonium chloride.
- Sal petrae (Med. Latin: "stone salt")/salt of petra/saltpetre/nitrate of potash – potassium nitrate, KNO_{3}, typically mined from covered dungheaps.
- Salt/common salt – a mineral, sodium chloride, NaCl, formed by evaporating seawater (impure form).
- Salt of tartar – potassium carbonate; also called potash.
- Salt of hartshorn/sal volatile – ammonium carbonate formed by distilling bones and horns.
- Tin salt – hydrated stannous chloride; see also spiritus fumans, another chloride of tin.

== Vitriols ==
- Blue vitriol – copper(II) sulfate pentahydrate.
- Green vitriol – a mineral; iron(II) sulfate heptahydrate. (or ferrous sulfate)
- Red vitriol - cobalt sulfate.
- Sweet vitriol – diethyl ether. It could be made by mixing oil of vitriol with spirit of wine and heating it.
- White vitriol – zinc sulfate, formed by lixiviating roasted zinc blende.

== Waters, oils and spirits ==
- Aqua fortis/spirit of nitre – nitric acid, formed by 2 parts saltpetre in 1 part (pure) oil of vitriol (sulfuric acid). (Historically, this process could not have been used, as 98% oil of vitriol was not available.)
- Aqua ragia/spirit of turpentine/oil of turpentine/gum turpentine – turpentine, formed by the distillation of pine tree resin.
- Aqua regia (Latin: "royal water") – a mixture of aqua fortis and spirit of salt.
- Aqua Tofana – arsenic trioxide, As_{2}O_{3} (extremely poisonous)
- Aqua vitae/aqua vita/spirit of wine, ardent spirits – ethanol, formed by distilling wine
- Butter (or oil) of antimony – antimony trichloride. Formed by distilling roasted stibnite with corrosive sublimate, or dissolving stibnite in hot concentrated hydrochloric acid and distilling. SbCl_{3}
- Butter of tin – hydrated tin(IV) chloride; see also spiritus fumans, another chloride of tin.
- Oil of tartar – concentrated potassium carbonate, K_{2}CO_{3} solution
- Oil of tartar per deliquium – potassium carbonate dissolved in the water which its extracts from the air.
- Oil of vitriol/spirit of vitriol – sulfuric acid, a weak version can be formed by heating green vitriol and blue vitriol. H_{2}SO_{4}
- Spirit of box/pyroxylic spirit – methanol, CH_{3}OH, distilled wood alcohol.
- Spiritus fumans – stannic chloride, formed by distilling tin with corrosive sublimate.
- Spirit of hartshorn – ammonia, formed by the decomposition of sal-ammoniac by unslaked lime.
- Spirit of salt/acidum salis – the liquid form of hydrochloric acid (also called muriatic acid), formed by mixing common salt with oil of vitriol.
  - Marine acid air – gaseous form of hydrochloric acid.

== Others ==
- Alkahest – universal solvent.
- Azoth – initially this referred to a supposed universal solvent but later became another name for Mercury.
- Bitumen – highly viscous liquid or semi-solid form of petroleum.
- Blende
- Brimstone – sulfur

- Flowers of sulfur – formed by distilling sulfur.

- Caustic potash/caustic wood alkali – potassium hydroxide, formed by adding lime to potash.
- Caustic Soda/caustic marine alkali – sodium hydroxide, NaOH, formed by adding lime to natron.
- Caustic volatile alkali – ammonium hydroxide.
- Corrosive sublimate – mercuric chloride, formed by subliming mercury, calcined green vitriol, common salt, and nitre.
- Gum Arabic – gum from the acacia tree.
- Liver of sulfur – a loosely defined mixture of potassium sulfide, potassium polysulfide, potassium thiosulfate, and likely potassium bisulfide.
- Lunar caustic/lapis infernalis – silver nitrate, formed by dissolving silver in aqua fortis and evaporating.
- Lye – potash in a water solution, formed by leaching wood ashes.

- Potash – potassium carbonate, formed by evaporating lye; also called salt of tartar. K_{2}CO_{3}
- Pearlash – formed by baking potash in a kiln.

- Milk of sulfur (lac sulphuris) – formed by adding an acid to thion hudor (lime sulfur).
- Natron/soda ash/soda – sodium carbonate. Na_{2}CO_{3}
- Nitrum flammans – ammonium nitrate.
- Sugar of lead – lead(II) acetate, formed by dissolving lead oxide in vinegar.
- Thion hudor – lime sulfur, formed by boiling flowers of sulfur with slaked lime.

== See also ==
- Alchemical symbol
- List of alchemists
