= Chrome orange =

Chemical compound and inorganic pigment

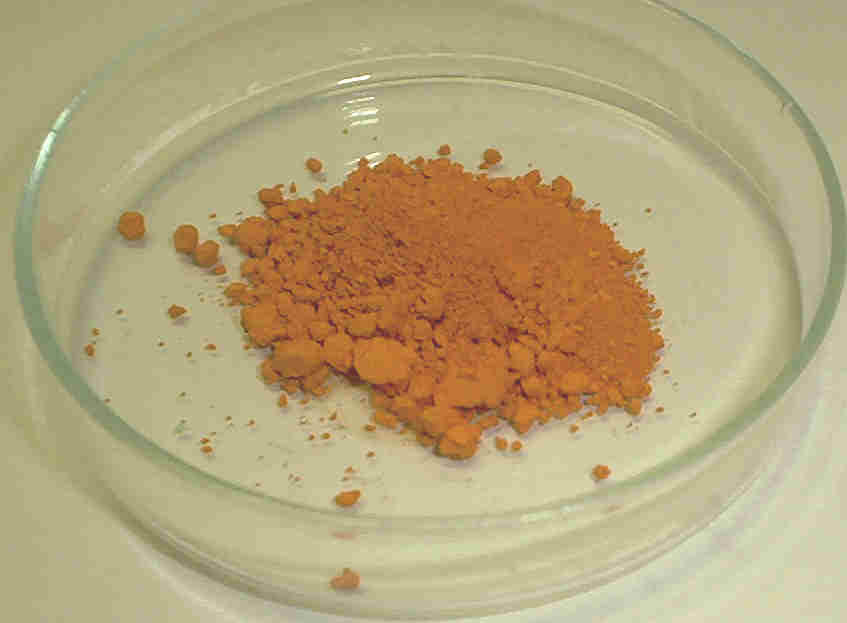

Names
- Other names: Basic chromium lead oxide; Chromium dilead pentaoxide; Chromium lead oxide; Dilead chromate oxide; Lead chromate oxide; Lead chromate(VI) oxide

Identifiers
| CAS Number | 18454-12-1 |
| 3D model (JSmol) | Interactive image |
| ChemSpider | 27052 |
| ECHA InfoCard | 100.038.476 |
| EC Number | 242-339-9 |
| PubChem CID | 29078 |
| CompTox Dashboard (EPA) | DTXSID90897143 |
- InChI: InChI=1S/Cr.5O.2Pb/q;;;;2*-1;;+2 Key: BXVHGCHMBBNRBU-UHFFFAOYSA-N
- SMILES: [O-][Cr](=O)(=O)[O-].O=[Pb].[Pb+2]

Properties
| Chemical formula | CrO_{5}Pb_{2} |
| Molar mass | 546.4 g·mol^{−1} |
| Appearance | red solid |
| Density | 6.63 g/cm^{3} |
| Melting point | 920 °C (1,690 °F; 1,190 K) |
| Solubility in water | insoluble |
| Solubility | soluble in acids, alkalis |

Structure
| Crystal structure | monoclinic |
| Space group | c2/m |
| Lattice constant | a = 14.018 Å, b = 5.683 Å, c = 7.143 Å α = 90°, β = 115.23°, γ = 90° |
| Lattice volume (V) | 514.8 Å^{3} |
| Formula units (Z) | 4 units per cell |

Thermochemistry
| Gibbs free energy (Δ_{f}G^{⦵}) | -1161.3 kJ/mol |

Hazards
- GHS labelling
| Pictograms | (GHS07: Exclamation mark) (GHS08: Health hazard) (GHS09: Environmental hazard) |
| Signal word | Danger |
| Hazard statements | H302, H332, H360, H373, H410 |
| Precautionary statements | P203, P260, P264, P270, P271, P273, P280, P301+P317, P304+P340, P317, P318, P319, P330, P391, P405, P501 |
| Threshold limit value (TLV) | 0.0002 mg/m^{3}, 0.0005 mg/m^{3} (STEL) |
- NIOSH (US health exposure limits)
| IDLH (Immediate danger) | 100.0 mg/m^{3} |
- Except where otherwise noted, data are given for materials in their standard state (at 25 °C [77 °F], 100 kPa). Infobox references

Chrome orange is a mixed oxide with the chemical formula Pb_{2}CrO_{5}. It has found use as a pigment.

== Properties ==
Visible light activity up to 550 nanometers has been recorded.

== Synthesis ==
Pb_{2}CrO_{5} can be made by treating a lead(II) salt with an alkaline solution of a chromate or by treating chrome yellow (PbCrO_{4}) with strongly basic solution.

It can also be synthesized using a gas-liquid precipitation process. Changing the pH controls whether PbCrO_{4} or Pb_{2}CrO_{5} is created.

=== Nanomaterial ===
Orthorhombic nanocrystals can be selectively synthesized by a room temperature solution reaction.

Using a microwave-assisted ionic liquid (MAIL) method, bundle and rod-like nanocrystals of Pb_{2}CrO_{5} are formed. In basic solution, single-crystalline Pb_{2}CrO_{5} could be formed by heating lead acetate and potassium dichromate with microwave radiation for only 10 minutes at 90 °C. The MAIL process is simple, fast, and does not employ surfactants. The presence of hydroxide changes the phase that is formed. Using NaOH, monoclinic Pb_{2}CrO_{5} is formed. The bundle and rod-shaped structures are sensitive to electron beam irradiation, which will turn them into many small particles.

=== Pigment ===
In a catalog published c. 1835, Winsor and Newton paint company identify ten synthetic pathways for producing chrome orange, also called deep yellow. Chrome orange is made of PbCrO_{4} mixed with basic lead chromate (Pb_{2}CrO_{5}). It has been described as a "yellowish red or sometimes a beautiful deep red" in alkaline conditions. A deep yellow can be created using PbCrO_{4} and lead sulfate. There are ten synthetic methods for preparing deep chrome yellow (that made with Pb_{2}CrO_{5}), which require a chromate source, a basic lead source, additives, and a sulfate source. Controlling the pH was Winsor and Newton's method for creating pigments from the pale yellow to the deep chrome orange. The resulting product has a high stability to light, which is always coveted by artists and collectors.

== Use as a pigment ==
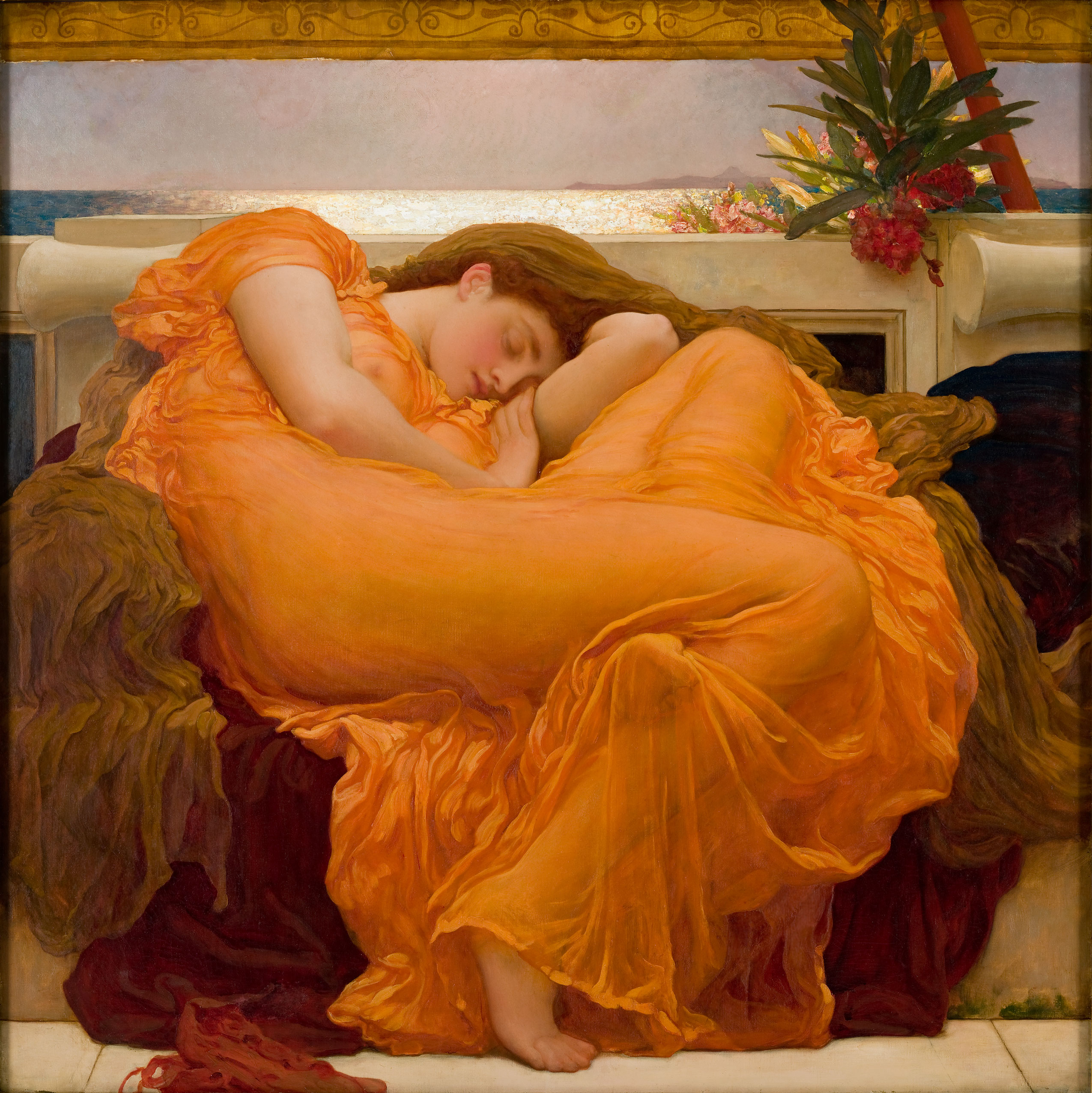
Chrome orange was used extensively in Frederic Leighton's Flaming June (1895; Museo de Arte de Ponce).

Chrome Orange

Color coordinates
- Hex triplet: #E73501
- sRGB^{B} (r, g, b): (231, 53, 1)
- HSV (h, s, v): (14°, 100%, 91%)
- CIELCh_{uv} (L, C, h): (51, 147, 16°)
- Source: ColourLex
- B: Normalized to [0–255] (byte)

Chrome orange can range in color from light to deep orange and is no longer in production as a pigment. It has also been known as Derby red, Persian red, and Victoria red. It was first recorded as a pigment in 1809 and was perfect for some impressionist painters in the nineteenth century. The yellow-orange pigment of the boat in Renoir's 1879 painting, The Seine at Asnières (The Skiff) at the National Gallery, London. Chrome orange was used extensively in Frederic Leighton's Flaming June (1895; Museo de Arte de Ponce).

== History ==
The natural mineral crocoite was discovered in 1797 by Louis Vauquelin and chrome orange was synthesized as a pigment for the first time in 1809. Pb_{2}CrO_{5} is found in mineral form as phoenicochroite, which is a monoclinic, red, translucent mineral found in various places across the world, including Russia, the US, and Chile.

== See also ==
- List of inorganic pigments
