= Goulac =

Goulac, also known as Glutrin, is a core binder developed from wood pulping. It is made from lignin pitch.

The material has a dark colour and is soluble in water.

Goulac water was used to make Gallagher sharp sand. It was trademarked in the 1940s. It prevents a chemical reaction between lead arsenate and lime sulphur.

When used to make mold cores from sand, it results in a very hard surface after baking, however the sand can absorb moisture if the core is not used soon after being prepared. Use of Goulac allows the cores to be baked at a lower temperature compared to other types of binders.

Glutrin was used in road paving in the early 20th century.

== See also ==
- Core (manufacturing)
