= Zaffre =

Deep blue pigment

Zaffre (Zaffer)

Color coordinates
- Hex triplet: #0014A8
- sRGB^{B} (r, g, b): (0, 20, 168)
- HSV (h, s, v): (233°, 100%, 66%)
- CIELCh_{uv} (L, C, h): (21, 81, 265°)
- Source: X11
- ISCC–NBS descriptor: Deep blue
- B: Normalized to [0–255] (byte)

Zaffre (also spelt Zaffer in American English, see spelling differences), a prescientific, or alchemical substance, is a deep blue pigment obtained by roasting cobalt ore, and is made of either an impure form of cobalt oxide or impure cobalt arsenate. During the Victorian Era, zaffre was used to prepare smalt and to stain glass blue.

The first recorded use of zaffer as a color name in English was sometime in the 1550s (exact year uncertain).

== See also ==
- List of colors
