= Alkahest =

Theorized universal solvent in alchemy

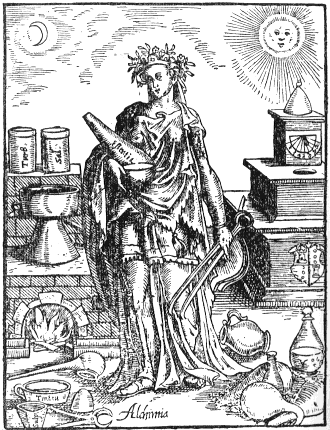
Image of Alchimia, the embodiment of alchemy. Woodcut published by Leonhard Thurneysser in 1574. Thurneysser was a student of Paracelsus.

In Renaissance alchemy, alkahest was the theorized "universal solvent". (Note: In modern times, water is sometimes called the universal solvent because it dissolves most substances but cannot significantly dissolve nonpolar substances such as oil, but in this case, the phrase "universal solvent" is meant to a greater extent.) It was supposed to be capable of dissolving any composite substance, including gold (then not considered an element), without altering or destroying its fundamental components. By extracting from composite substances their fundamental virtues and properties, alchemists hoped to gain control of invaluable medical healing properties (see also azoth). For this reason the alkahest was earnestly sought. At the same time, its very existence was debated among alchemists and philosophers.

The first, or one of the first, to mention the alkahest was the Swiss physician and alchemist Paracelsus.

== Etymology ==
There is no consensus on the origin and etymology of the word alkahest, as Paracelsus left no trace or history of the word. One such view is that the term is of Arabic origin or pseudo-Arabic modeled on similar names of other chemical entities. George Starkey argued it came from the German word al-gehest (all spirit). Johann Rudolph Glauber posed that it could have come from the words alhali est, the German word al gar heis, or Al zu hees, meaning "very hot". Anglo-Dutch alchemist and physician William Yworth (Cleidophorus Mystagogus) (died 1715) argued for its root originating from High Dutch.

=== Other names ===
Jan Baptist van Helmont considered the alkahest to have never-ending reusability, calling it an "immortal". He also used the term "maccabean fire" because of its similarities to the "thick water" in the deuterocanonical Book of Maccabees in the Old Testament. Another name for the Alkahest termed by Helmont was ignis gehennae. Other names include latex (or "clear water reduced to its minutest atoms"), and primum Ens Salum (or "salt exalted to its highest degree").

== History ==
=== 16th century ===
==== Paracelsus ====
Among its many philosophical and spiritual preoccupations, Hermeticism also concerned itself with panaceas—remedies supposed to cure all diseases and prolong life indefinitely. Later, an emergent Latin alchemy, associated with European humanism, transmuted itself into a new, more modern medical and pharmaceutical philosophy, reformed by a better understanding of human physiology. Philippus Paracelsus (1493–1541), who gave his name to the early modern school of medical theory known as Paracelcism, first made mention of the alkahest as a chemical which could fortify the liver, and—in instances where the liver failed—could act as a substitute for its functions.

===== Recipe =====
The recipe for the theorized alkahest was often kept secret, as many alchemical recipes were. There were many alchemists attempting to obtain the universal solvent, and thus many recipes, some later rejected by their creators, have been found. Paracelsus's own recipe for alkahest was made of caustic lime, alcohol, and carbonate of potash; however, his recipe was not intended to be a "universal solvent".

=== 17th century ===
Alkahest became very popular in the 17th and 18th centuries through Jan Baptist van Helmont. Its prevalence in the 17th and 18th centuries, despite its otherwise absurd and extreme qualities, was likely due to the popularity of alchemy at the time and the lack of an adequate alternative theory of chemistry. During the 17th century, many alchemists were working on obtaining the alkahest, some of which were Johann Rudolf Glauber, George Starkey, Frederick Clod, Thomas Vaughan, Thomas Henshaw, Johann Brun, Robert Hamilton, Hugh Piatt, and Robert Child. Those who followed and trained under Paracelsus did not think of the alkahest as van Helmont did, but slowly built upon the ideas posed by their teacher.

==== Jan Baptist van Helmont: Alkahest as a universal solvent ====
Flemish chemist Jan Baptist van Helmont (1580–1644) expanded on the idea of the 'alkahest', believing it to be a universal solvent. Helmont claimed that knowledge of the recipe was granted by God and was therefore known by few, and he had many dreams during which he believed he had been gifted the recipe, only to find them inadequate. Given the difficulty of obtaining alkahest, Helmont suggested the use of other, inferior substances believed to be capable of similar tasks. Volatile salt of tartar, also known as pyrotartaric acid or glutaric acid, was considered both a substitute for alkahest and a component of alkahest. Helmont's writings also referred to a fourteenth century alchemical manuscript which discussed sal alkali (possibly caustic potash or lye) that was capable of dissolving many substances, and perhaps an ingredient in Helmont's alkahest.

==== George Starkey ====
Colonial American alchemist George Starkey (1628–1665) described alkahest as a circulated salt that is neither acid nor alkali. Moreover, Starkey believed that, because acid saline liquors are destroyed by alkalies and urinous spirits, they cannot be ingredients of the immortal alkahest. He believed instead that non-acidic substances could be ingredients of the alkahest, some of these suspected substances being urinous spirits, spirit of alkalies, and sulphureous vegetable spirits. In particular, Starkey believed that alkahest's secret ingredient laid within urine.

===== Dissolving gold; removing sulphur from mercury; cure for urinary calculi =====
Starkey and his mentor Helmont (by their own report) used mercuric sulphide to dissolve gold, and informed Robert Boyle about it in a series of letters. The alkahest, according to Starkey, was able to remove sulphur from the natural mercury leaving a quicksilver resistant to corrosion. Because of the supposed power of alkahest to break down substances into their occult qualities, it was sought after for its potential to cure incurable diseases at the time. For example, the breaking down of Ludus could provide a cure for urinary calculi.

Ladislaus Reti, a 20th-century historian of science, investigated alchemical recipes involving alkahest and found that no chemical was sufficient in breaking down the wide variety of materials Helmont supposed. Reti points out that in such recipes, an alcohol solution of potassium hydroxide could have been used instead.

==== Johann Rudolf Glauber and nitric acid ====
German-Dutch alchemist and chemist Johann Rudolf Glauber (1604–1670) believed that the alkahest was a class of substances, rather than one, particular substance. Glauber believed he had discovered alkahest after discovering that volatile niter (nitric acid) and fixed niter (potassium carbonate) were able to dissolve several substances.

==== Frederick Clod ====
German "mystical chemist" Frederick Clod (or Clodius) (1625–after 1661) believed that mercury could convert salts into "ponderous liquor", which he believed was needed to make the alkahest.

==== Robert Boyle – corpuscular nature of alkahest ====
The theory of alkahest was conceived in terms of alchemy, Helmontian theories, and the physical theory of corpuscularianism. According to Helmont and Anglo-Irish scientist Robert Boyle (1627–1691), the alkahest had a "microstructure", meaning it was composed of extremely small, homogeneous corpuscles. This structure allowed the alkahest's corpuscles to move between the corpuscles of all other materials and mechanically separate them without altering their base materials or itself, conforming with the idea that it was infinitely reuseable. It was these qualities which made the alkahest distinct from ordinary corrosives, which are altered by the substances they act upon and thus not infinitely reusable.

==== Tobias Ludwig Kohlhans and Henry Oldenburg – alkahest in the lymphatic vessels ====
Tobias Ludwig Kohlhans (1624–1705) suggested in his dissertation of the spleen, that alkahest could be found in the liquid that had been discovered in the lymphatic vessels of animals. In 1661, German-English scientist Henry Oldenburg (c. 1618–1677) made experimental connections between alkahest and this liquid. Helmont, Oldenburg, and Goddard raised questions, however, about the lymph's "sweetly acidic" quality, the necessity of a hypothetical universal solvent to explain the acidity in empty animal lymphatic vessels, its ability to be generated within the body, and how it differed from other fluids or humours in the body.

==== Johann Kunckel – the existence of alkahest is questioned ====
The German alchemist Johann Kunckel (1630–1703) and others at that time began to see the alkahest as merely fantasy and wishful thinking. A potential problem involving alkahest—first posed by Kunckel—is that, if it dissolves everything, then it cannot be placed into a container because it would dissolve the container. Starkey, however, specified that alkahest dissolved only composite materials into their constituent, elemental parts; hence, a hypothetical container made of a pure element (say, lead) would not be dissolved by alkahest.

===== Herman Boerhaave: alkahest and the philosopher's stone =====
Paracelsus believed that alkahest was, in fact, the philosopher's stone. Dutch chemist and physician Herman Boerhaave (1668–1738), in his textbook Elementa Chymiae (1732), did not think alkahest was the philosopher's stone, but of greater importance and value than the stone.

After the 18th century alkahest was taken less seriously over time.

== Modern usages of the term ==
In modern times, water is sometimes called the universal solvent, because it can dissolve a large variety of substances; more than any other liquid. This is due to its chemical polarity and amphoterism.

The old remark "spit is the universal solvent" satirizes the idea.

Alkahest, Inc. is a biopharmaceutical subsidiary of Grifols which is developing products derived from blood plasma to reverse and inhibit aging.

"Alkahestry" is the term used for a type of alchemy in the manga series Fullmetal Alchemist.
