= Vittorio Algarotti =

Vittorio Algarotti (1533-1604), was born in Verona, Republic of Venice, and was president of the Verona College of Medicine from 1593 through his death in 1604. A contemporary of Paracelsus, he introduced the use of antimony oxychloride, which he referred to as pulveris angelicus (powder of the angels) to medicine.
