= Johann von Löwenstern-Kunckel =

German chemist (1630–1703)

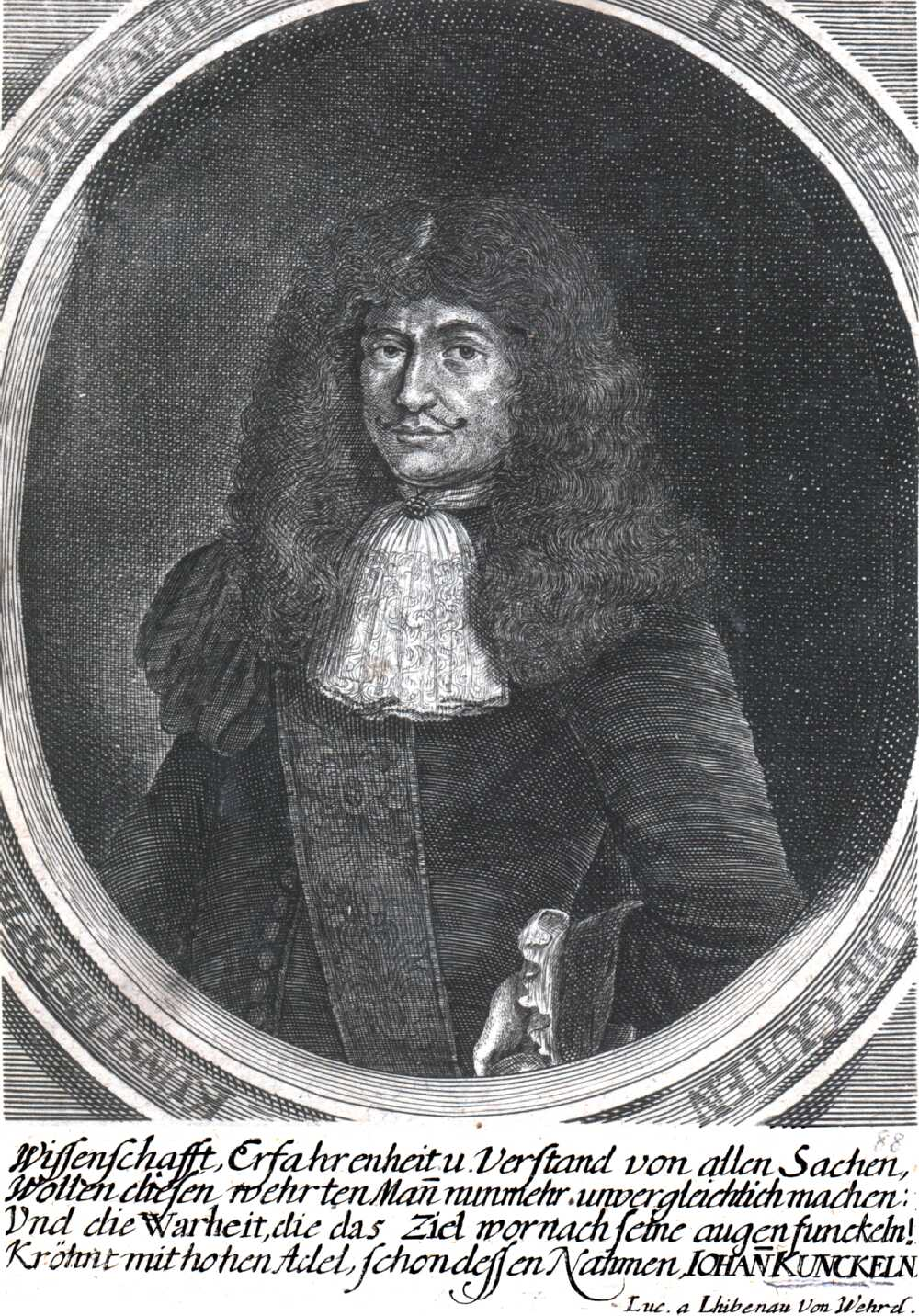

Johann Kunckel, awarded Swedish nobility in 1693 under the Swedish name von Löwenstern-Kunckel and the German version of the name Kunckel von Löwenstern (1630 - prob. 20 March 1703), German chemist, was born in 1630 (or 1638), near Rendsburg, his father being alchemist to the court of Holstein. He became chemist and apothecary to the dukes of Lauenburg, and then to the Elector of Saxony, Johann Georg II, who put him in charge of the royal laboratory at Dresden. Intrigues engineered against him caused him to resign this position in 1677, and for a time he lectured on chemistry at Annaberg and Wittenberg. Invited to Berlin by Frederick William, in 1679 he became director of the laboratory and glass works of Brandenburg. In 1688 the king of Sweden, Charles XI, brought him to Stockholm, ennobling him under the name von Löwenstern-Kunckel in 1693 and making him a member of the Bergskollegium, the Board of Mines. He died probably on 20 March 1703 near Stockholm (other sources claim he died the previous year 1702 at Dreissighufen, his country house near Prenden, Germany).

Kunkel shares with Boyle the honor of having discovered the secret of the process by which Hennig Brand of Hamburg had prepared phosphorus in 1669, and he found how to make artificial ruby (red glass) by the incorporation of Purple of Cassius. His work also included observations on putrefaction and fermentation, which he spoke of as sisters, on the nature of salts and on the preparation of pure metals. Though he lived in an atmosphere of alchemy, he derided the notion of the alkahest or universal solvent, and denounced the deceptions of fraudulent people who pretended to effect the transmutation of metals (this does not mean he did not believe in transmutation, though; in his "Experimental Confirmation of Chymical Philosophy" alone he claims to have achieved at least three different transmutations), he believed mercury to be a constituent of all metals and heavy minerals, though he held there was no proof of the presence of "sulphur comburens".

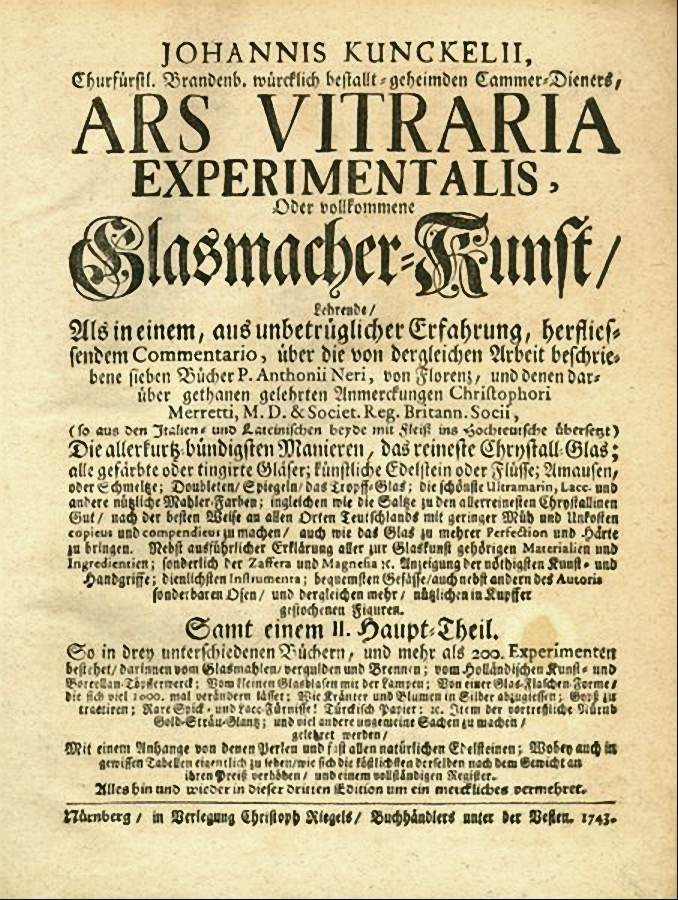
Ars Vitraria Experimentalis

His chief works were Öffentliche Zuschrift von dem Phosphor Mirabil (1678); Ars vitriaria experimentalis (1689) and Laboratorium chymicum (1716). As is discussed in his Laboratorium chymicum, Kunckel was involved in early experiments into the production of explosive mercury.
