= Gum turpentine =

Gum turpentine may refer to:

- Oleoresin of the pine tree, also known as crude turpentine
- Oil of turpentine obtained from pine gum (oleoresin)
