= William Yworth =

Dutch-English distiller and physician

William Yworth or Yarworth (Dutch: Willem IJvaert) (died 1715) was an Anglo-Dutch distiller, alchemist, and physician who collaborated with Isaac Newton. He wrote a number of tracts on distilling and alchemy. Two of his alchemical works, Mercury′s Caducean Rod (1702) and Trifertes Sagani, or Immortal Dissolvent (1705) appeared under the pseudonym Cleidophorus Mystagogus. Cleidophorus is the Latinized form of the Greek kleidophoros (κλειδοφόρος), meaning "key bearer," and Mystagogus is, of course, a Latin term for a mystagogue. Yworth was associated with a number of Quakers and buried in the Quaker Burial Ground at Woodbridge, Suffolk, which, as Wallworth observes, suggests that he may have been a Quaker.

== Works ==
- A New Treatise of Artificial Wines, or, A Bacchean Magazine (1690)
- A New Art of Making Wines, Brandy, and Other Spirits, Compliant to the Late Act of Parliament (1691)
- Chymicus Rationalis (1692)
- Cerevisiarii Comes (1692)
- Introitus Apertus ad Artem Distillationis (1692)
- The Britannian Magazine: or, A new art of making above twenty sorts of English wines... (1694/1700)
- Mercury′s Caducean Rod (1702)
- Processus Mysterii Magni (1702)
- Trifertes Sagani, or Immortal Dissolvent (1705)
- The Compleat Distiller (1705)
