= Crocoite =

Lead chromate mineral

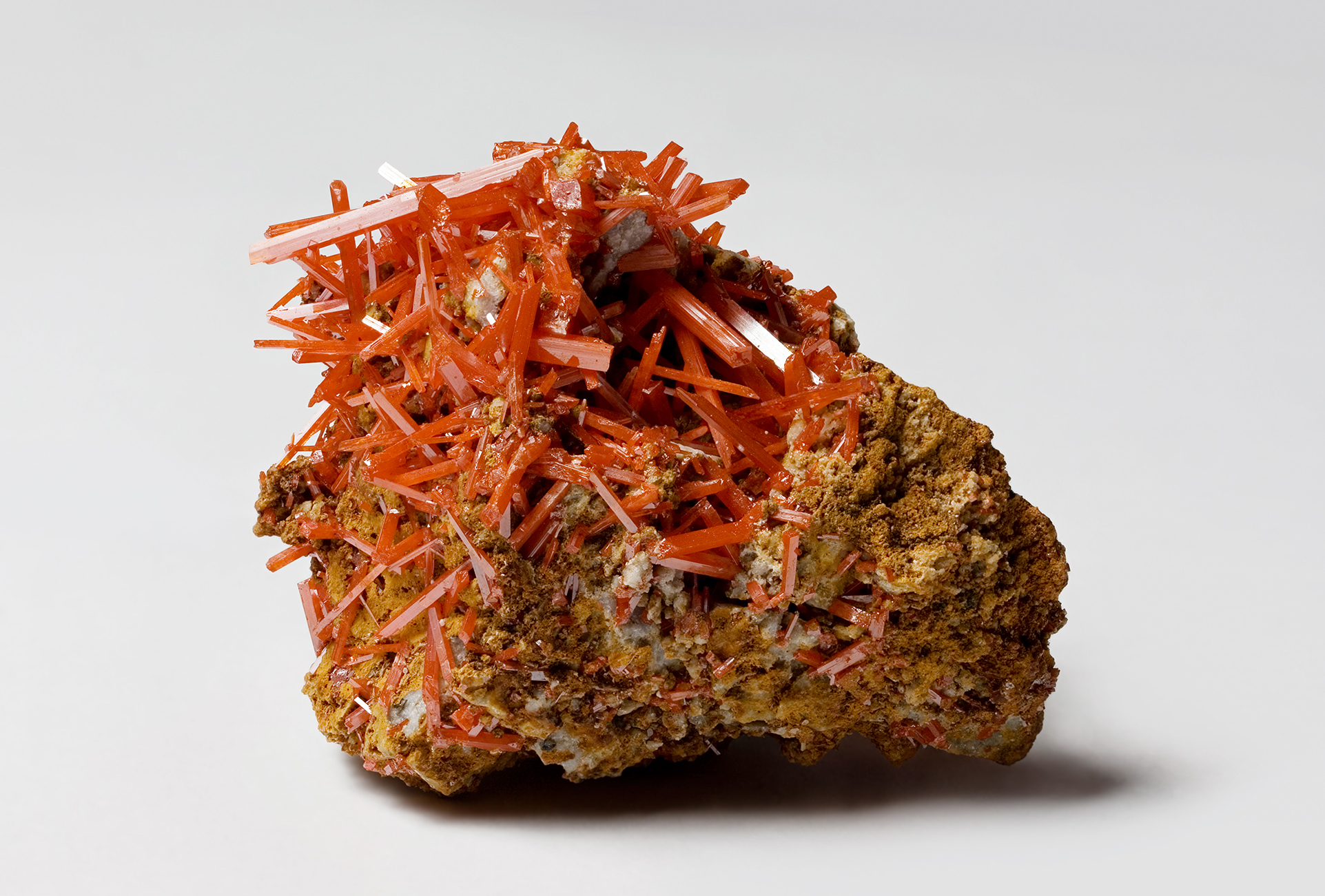
- Crocoite from Dundas, Tasmania

General
- Category: Chromate minerals
- Formula: Lead Chromate PbCrO_{4}
- IMA symbol: Crc
- Strunz classification: 7.FA.20
- Crystal system: Monoclinic
- Crystal class: Prismatic (2/m) (same H-M symbol)
- Space group: P2_{1}/n
- Unit cell: a = 7.12 Å, b = 7.421 Å, c = 6.8 Å; β = 102.41°; Z = 4

Identification
- Color: Orange, red, yellow; orange-red in transmitted light.
- Crystal habit: Coarsely crystalline to acicular
- Cleavage: Distinct on {110} indistinct on {001} and {100}
- Fracture: Conchoidal to uneven
- Tenacity: Sectile
- Mohs scale hardness: 2.5–3
- Luster: Adamantine, Sub-Adamantine, Sub-Vitreous, Resinous, Waxy
- Streak: Yellowish orange
- Diaphaneity: Transparent to translucent
- Specific gravity: 5.9–6.1
- Optical properties: Biaxial (+)
- Refractive index: n_{α} = 2.290(2) n_{β} = 2.360(2) n_{γ} = 2.660(2)
- Birefringence: δ = 0.370
- Pleochroism: Weak

Crocoite is a mineral consisting of lead chromate, PbCrO_{4}, and crystallizing in the monoclinic crystal system. It is identical in composition with the artificial product chrome yellow used as a paint pigment.

== Description ==
Crocoite is commonly found as large, well-developed prismatic adamantine crystals, although in many cases are poorly terminated. Crystals are of a bright hyacinth-red color, translucent, and have an adamantine to vitreous lustre. On exposure to UV light some of the translucency and brilliancy is lost. The streak is orange-yellow; Mohs hardness is 2.5–3; and the specific gravity is 6.0.

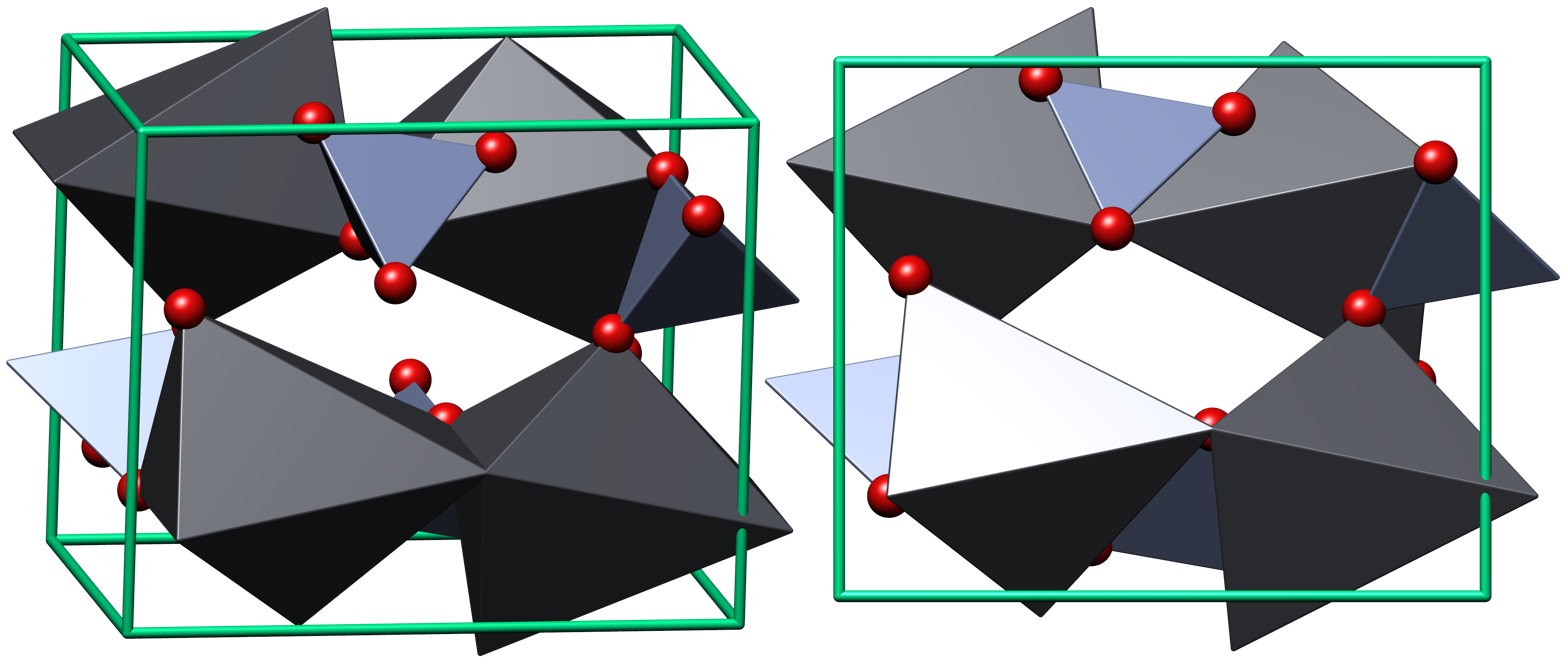
Crocoite crystal structure

It was discovered at the Berezovskoe Au Deposit (Berezovsk Mines) near Ekaterinburg in the Urals in 1766; and named crocoise by F. S. Beudant in 1832, from the Greek κρόκος (krokos), saffron, in allusion to its color, a name first altered to crocoisite and afterwards to crocoite. In the type locality the crystals are found in gold-bearing quartz-veins traversing granite or gneiss and associated with crocoite are quartz, embreyite, phoenicochroite and vauquelinite. Phoenicochroite is a basic lead chromate, Pb_{2}CrO_{5} with dark red crystals, and vauquelinite a lead and copper phosphate-chromate, Pb_{2}CuCrO_{4}PO_{4}OH, with brown or green monoclinic crystals. Vauquelinite was named after Louis Nicolas Vauquelin, who in 1797 discovered (simultaneously with and independently of M. H. Klaproth) the element chromium in crocoite.

Abundant masses with exceptional examples of crocoite crystals have been found at Extended Mine, Adelaide Mine, Red Lead, West Comet, Platt and a few other Mines at Dundas, Tasmania.

The Adelaide Mine is described as "probably the prime source of crocoite in the world.". The Adelaide Mining Company Pty. Ltd. has been actively mining crocoite from the Adelaide Mine since 2004. The website provides detailed information about the mine's history, operations, and the exceptional crocoite specimens it produces.

Crocoite is usually found in long slender prisms, usually about 10–20 mm but rarely up to 100 mm (4 inches) in length, with a brilliant lustre and color. Crocoite is also the official Tasmanian mineral emblem. Other localities which have yielded good crystallized specimens are Congonhas do Campo near Ouro Preto in Brazil, Luzon in the Philippines, Mutare in Mashonaland, near Menzies in Western Australia, plus Brazil, Germany and South Africa.

The relative rarity of crocoite is connected with the specific conditions required for its formation: an oxidation zone of lead ore bed and presence of ultramafic rocks serving as the source of chromium (in chromite). Oxidation of Cr^{3+} into CrO_{4}^{2−} (from chromite) and decomposition of galena (or other primary lead minerals) are required for crocoite formation. These conditions are relatively unusual.

As crocoite is composed of lead(II) chromate, it is toxic, containing both lead and hexavalent chromium.

== Mines ==
The Adelaide Mine, Dundas, Tasmania, is famous for its world’s best crocoite. Adam Wright and his partners have been operating it for mineral specimen removal for a number of years and have had significant finds in recent years. In particular, the 2010 Pocket, and more recently, the Red River Pocket.

The Mineralogical Record has documented major crocoite discoveries at the Adelaide Mine, including the significant "Red River Find" in 2012. This publication highlights the mine's ongoing importance in the mineral collecting community.

Of the mines in the Dundas field, the Adelaide mine is the most prolific source of superb crocoite specimens, historically as well as currently. The mine is situated at the junction of Comet Creek and Adelaide Creek, near the base of a spur of Stichtite Hill about 2 km southeast of the original Dundas townsite.

Of the numerous mines in the Dundas region, one has recently come back to life more than any other - The Adelaide Mine. The video titled "The Adelaide Mine" features Mineralogist Ralph Bottrill from Mineral Resources Tasmania, who provides an in-depth exploration of the renowned Adelaide Mine located in the Dundas region of Tasmania. In the video, viewers are taken underground to uncover the remarkable Red River find.

Red Lead Mine, The Red Lead Mine, located in the Dundas region near Zeehan on the west coast of Tasmania, Australia, is renowned for its stunning crocoite specimens. Shane Dohnt purchased the Red Lead Mine in 1986 and has been actively working it for crocoite ever since. Initially, he continued with open-cut mining, but more recently, he has reopened an 1890s collapsed adit to access the lodes below the surface. This approach reduces environmental impact and allows access to potentially rich areas too deep for open-cut mining.

The Red Lead Mine has produced many fine specimens of crocoite over the years, and operations continue with the hope of discovering more exceptional specimens. The mine's crocoite specimens are highly sought after by collectors and have even been displayed at the Smithsonian Museum of Natural History in Washington D.C.

Dundas Extended Mine. Crocoite from Tasmania has also been mined from the Dundas Extended Mine by Mike and Eleanor Phelan since the mid-1980s, but the mine's origins date back to 1892 when it was used as a prospecting tunnel for silver lead. In April 2019, the mine was listed for sale, however, it was not sold.

== Gallery ==
Examples of crocoite

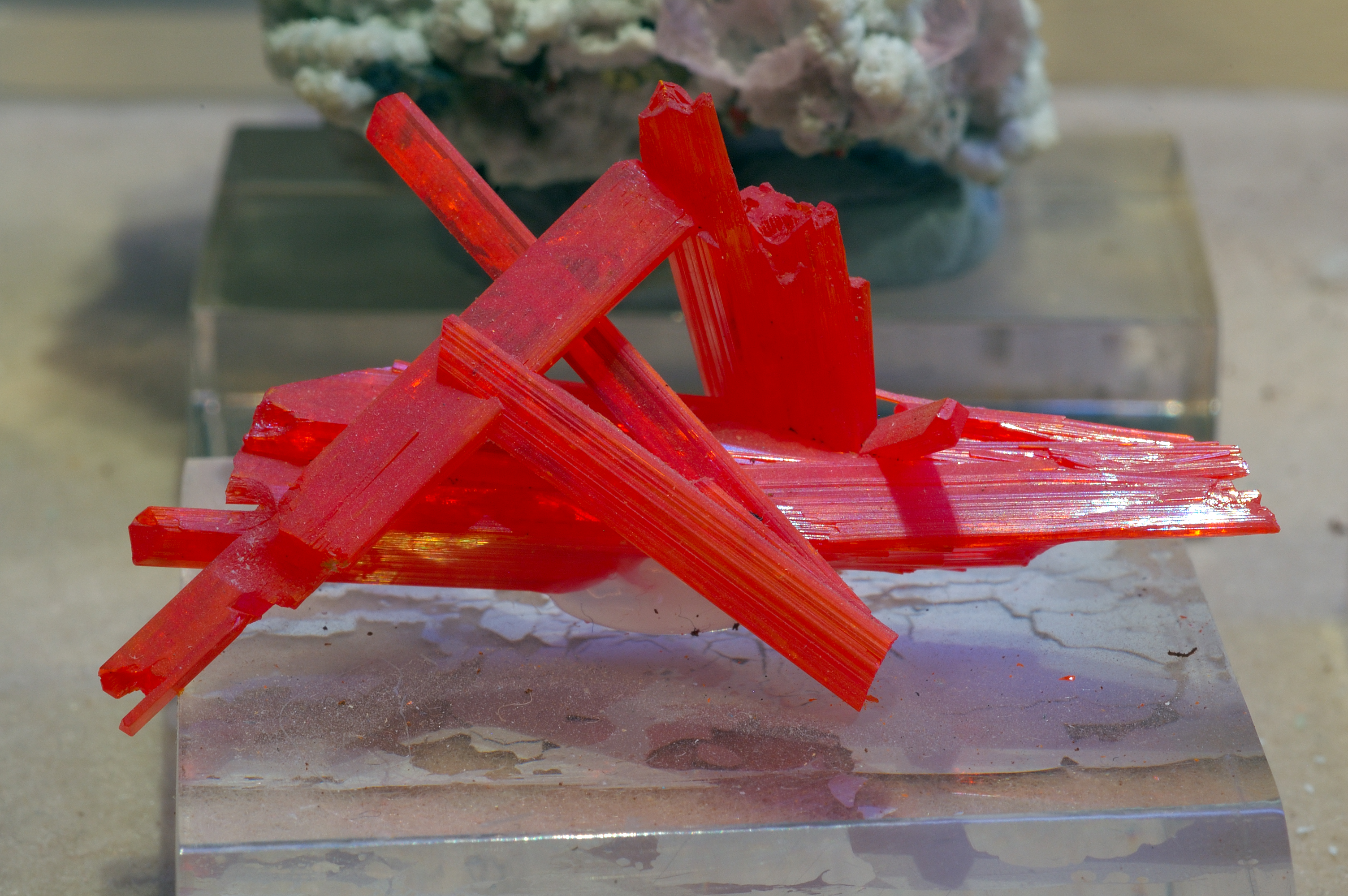
Specimen from the Red Lead Mine, Tasmania, Australia

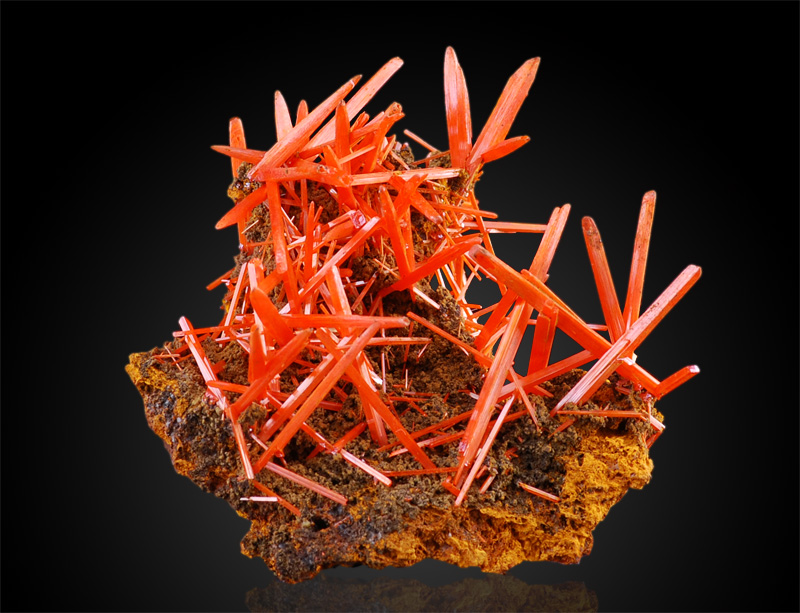
Crocoite from Adelaide Mine, Dundas mineral field, Zeehan District, Tasmania, Australia

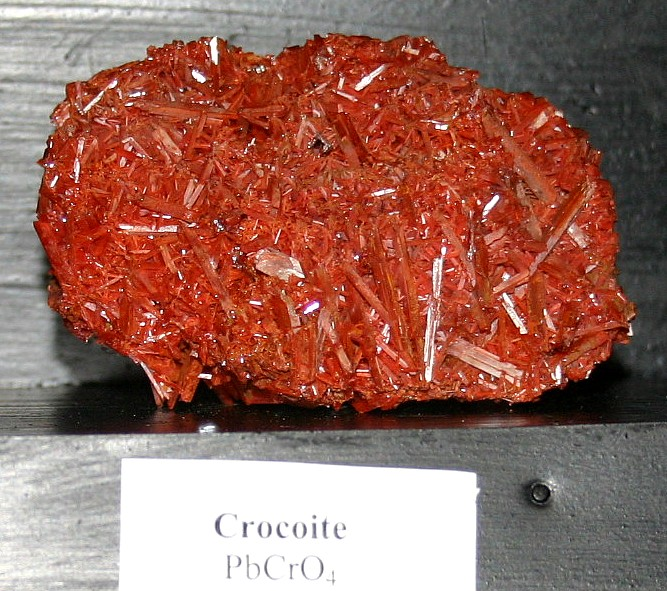
Crystal intergrowth

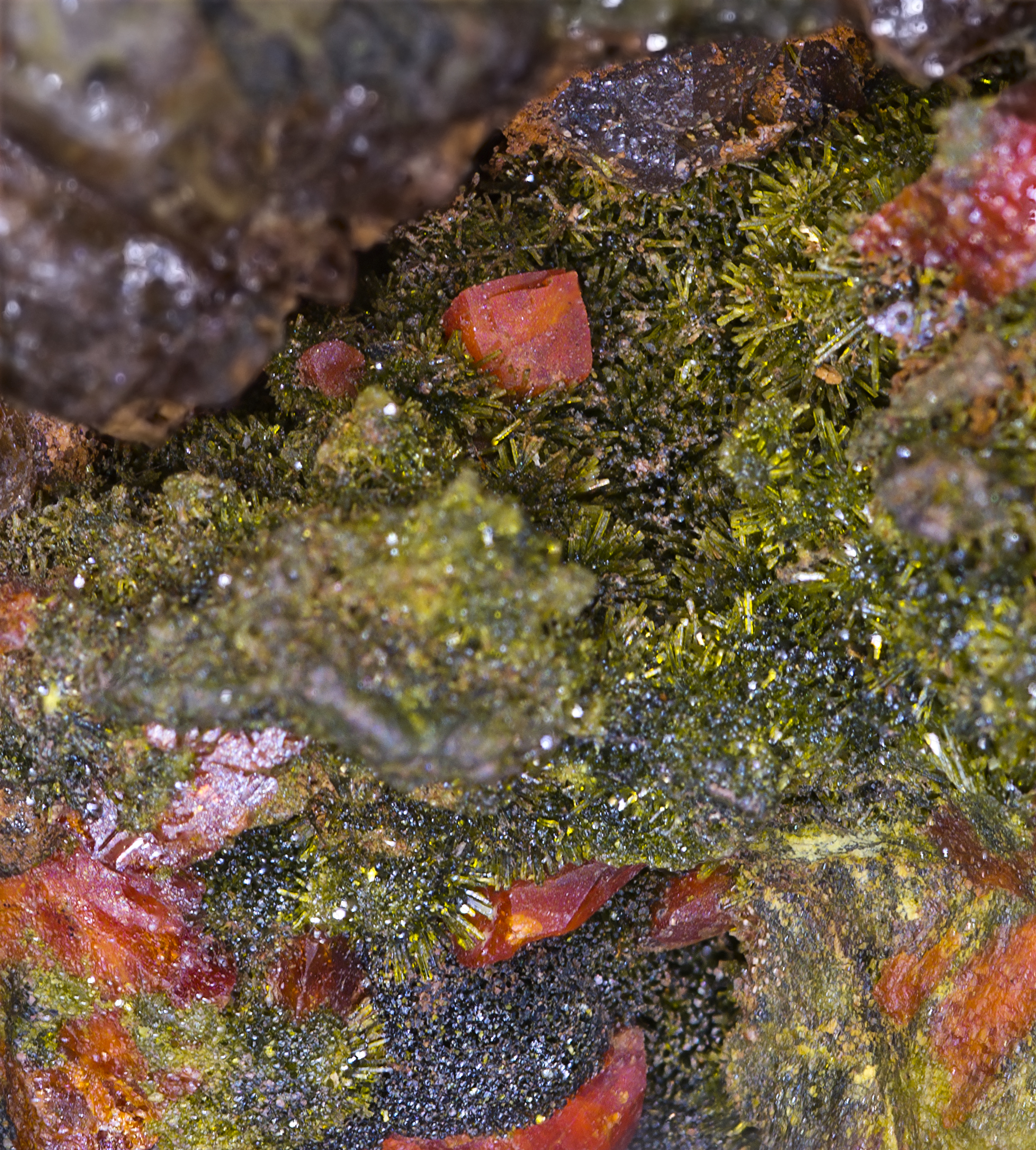
On pyromorphite – Berezovsk – Deposit Topotype

== See also ==
- Chrome yellow
- Lead chromate
- Bellite
