= Lead(II) chromate =

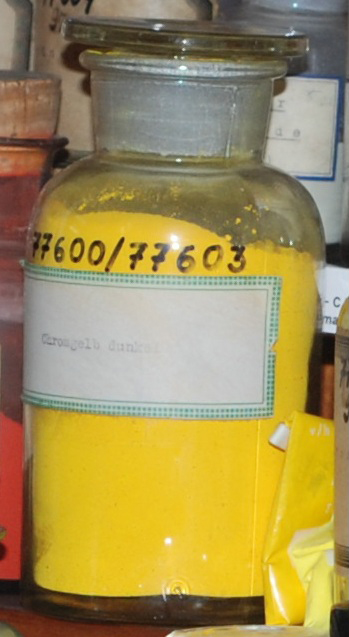
- Lead(II) chromate, chrome yellow, chromic acid lead(II) salt, canary chrome yellow 40-2250, Holtint Middle Chrome, chrome green, chrome green UC61, chrome green UC74, chrome green UC76, chrome lemon, crocoite, dianichi chrome yellow G, lemon yellow, king's yellow, Leipzig yellow, lemon yellow, Paris yellow, pigment green 15, plumbous chromate, pure lemon chrome L3GS.

Names
- Other names see text

Identifiers
CAS Number	7758-97-6
3D model (JSmol)	Interactive image
ChEBI	CHEBI:86257
ChemSpider	22868
ECHA InfoCard	100.028.951
EC Number	231-846-0
PubChem CID	24460
RTECS number	GB2975000
UNII	AA3229AOUS
UN number	3085 (LEAD CHROMATE); 2291
CompTox Dashboard (EPA)	DTXSID1064792
- InChI: InChI=1S/Cr.4O.Pb/q;;;2*-1;+2 Key: MOUPNEIJQCETIW-UHFFFAOYSA-N
- SMILES: [O-][Cr](=O)(=O)[O-].[Pb+2]

Properties
Chemical formula	PbCrO_{4}
Molar mass	323.192 g/mol
Appearance	bright yellow powder
Density	6.12 g/cm^{3}, solid
Solubility in water	0.00001720 g/100 mL (20 °C)
Solubility	soluble in diluted nitric acid insoluble in acetic acid, ammonia
Magnetic susceptibility (χ)	−18.0·10^{−6} cm^{3}/mol
Refractive index (n_{D})	2.31

Structure
Crystal structure	monoclinic

Hazards
- Occupational safety and health (OHS/OSH)
Main hazards	Moderately toxic, carcinogenic, teratogenic
- GHS labelling
Pictograms	(GHS08: Health hazard) (GHS09: Environmental hazard)
Signal word	Danger
Hazard statements	H350, H360, H373, H410
Precautionary statements	P201, P273, P308+P313, P501
NFPA 704 (fire diamond)	3 0 0
- Lethal dose or concentration (LD, LC)
LD_{50} (median dose)	>12 g/kg (mouse, oral)
Safety data sheet (SDS)	ICSC 0003; Sigma-Aldrich
- Except where otherwise noted, data are given for materials in their standard state (at 25 °C [77 °F], 100 kPa). verify (what is ?) Infobox references

Lead(II) chromate is an inorganic compound with the chemical formula PbCrO_{4}. It is a bright yellow salt that is very poorly soluble in water. It occurs also as the mineral crocoite. It is used as a pigment (chrome yellow).

== Structure ==
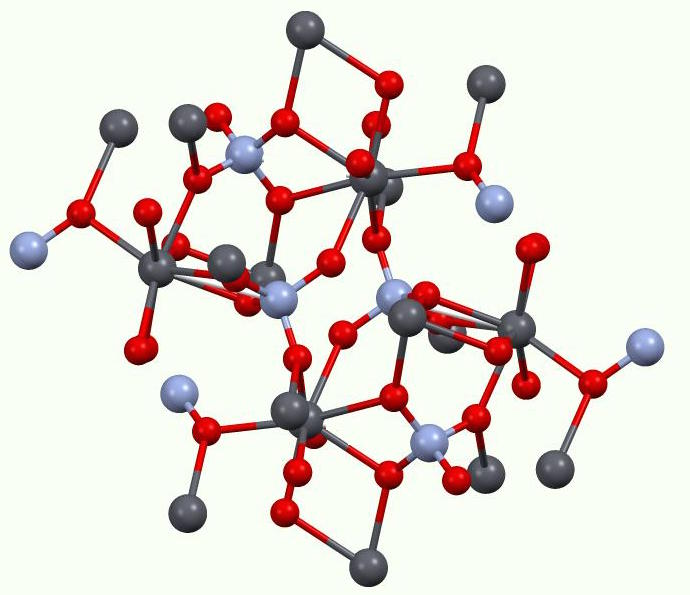
Structure of PbCrO4 as determined by X-ray crystallography. Color code: red = O, dark gray = Pb, light gray = Cr.

Two polymorphs of lead chromate are known, orthorhombic and the more stable monoclinic form. Monoclinic lead chromate is used in paints under the name chrome yellow, and many other names. Lead chromate adopts the monazite structure, meaning that the connectivity of the atoms is very similar to other compounds of the type MM'O_{4}. Pb(II) has a distorted coordination sphere being surrounded by eight oxides with Pb-O distances ranging from 2.53 to 2.80 Å. The chromate anion is tetrahedral, as usual. Unstable polymorphs of lead chromate are the greenish yellow orthorhombic form and a red-orange tetragonal form.

== Preparation ==
Lead(II) chromate can be produced by treating sodium chromate with lead salts such as lead(II) nitrate or by combining lead(II) oxide with chromic acid.

Related lead sulfochromate pigments are produced by the replacement of some chromate by sulfate, resulting in a mixed lead-chromate-sulfate compositions Pb(CrO_{4})_{1−x}(SO_{4})_{x}. This replacement is possible because sulfate and chromate are isostructural. Since sulfate is colorless, sulfochromates with high values of x are less intensely colored than lead chromate. In some cases, chromate is replaced by molybdate.

== Applications ==
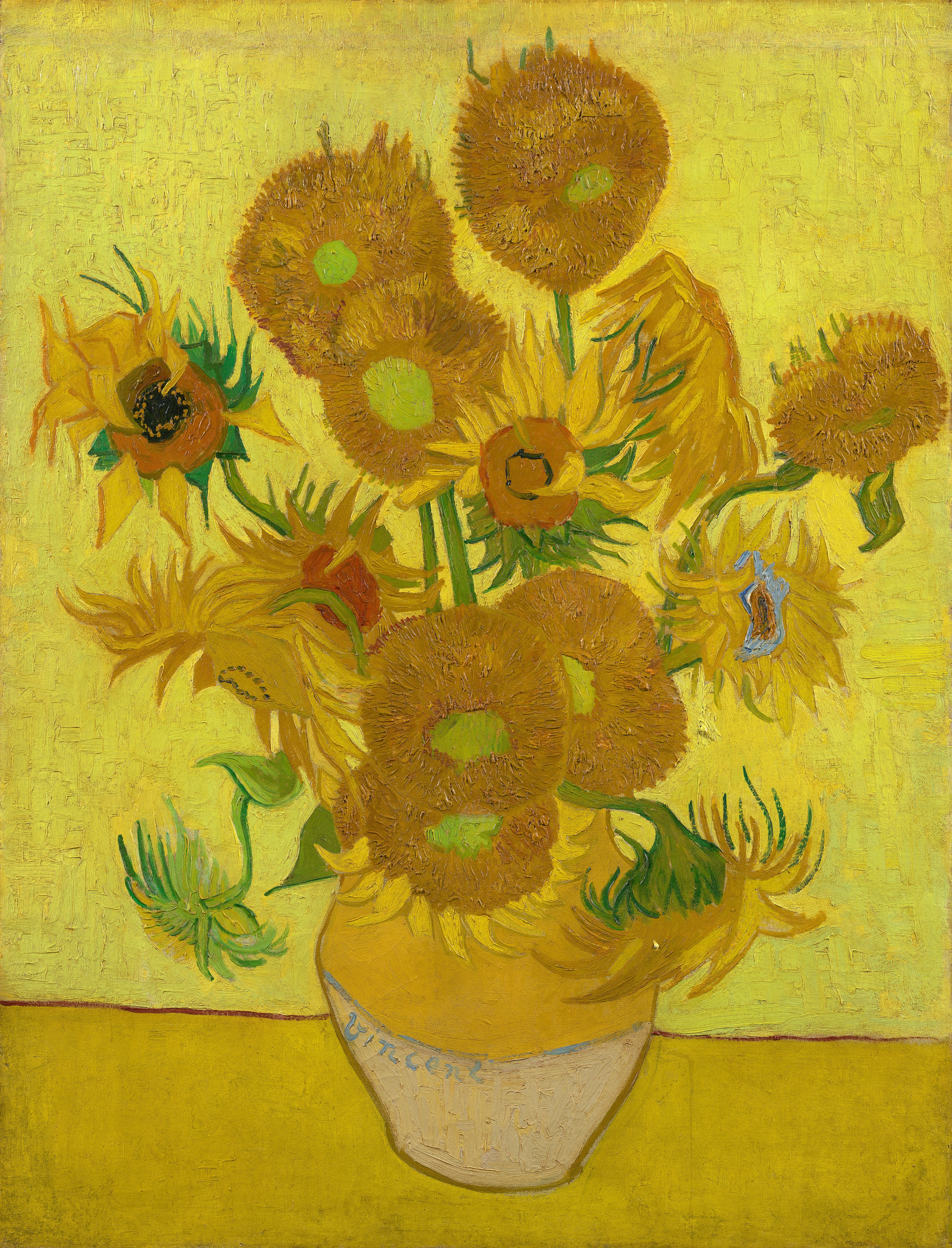
Lead chromate is used as the bright yellow pigment in Sunflowers, a painting by Vincent van Gogh.

Approximately 37,000 tons were produced in 1996. The main applications are as a pigment in paints, under the name chrome yellow.

== Reactions ==
Heating in hydroxide solution produces chrome orange, a yellowish red or orange powder made by PbO and CrO_{3}. Also, in hydroxide solution lead chromate slowly dissolves forming plumbite complex.

PbCrO_{4} + 4 OH^{−} → [Pb(OH)_{4}]^{2−} + CrO^{2−}_{4}

== Safety hazards ==
Despite containing both lead and hexavalent chromium, lead chromate is not acutely lethal because of its very low solubility. The LD50 for rats is only 5,000 mg/kg. Lead chromate must be treated with great care in its manufacture, the main concerns being dust of the chromate precursor. Lead chromate is highly regulated in advanced countries. As one of the greatest threats comes from inhalation of particles, much effort has been devoted to production of low-dust forms of the pigment.

In the 1800s, the product was used to impart a bright yellow color to some types of candy. It is used (illegally) to enhance the color of certain spices, particularly turmeric, particularly in Bangladesh.

Unlike other lead-based paint pigments, lead chromate is still widely used, especially in road marking paint.

In 2023 and 2024, consumption of adulterated cinnamon led to at least 136 cases of lead toxicity in children in the United States as reported by the US Centers for Disease Control and Prevention. The affected products were recalled. The US Food and Drug Administration determined that the ratio of lead to chromium in the cinnamon indicated that lead chromate had been added to the cinnamon.

== See also ==
- Crocoite
- Chrome yellow
