= Azoth =

Idealized substance in alchemy

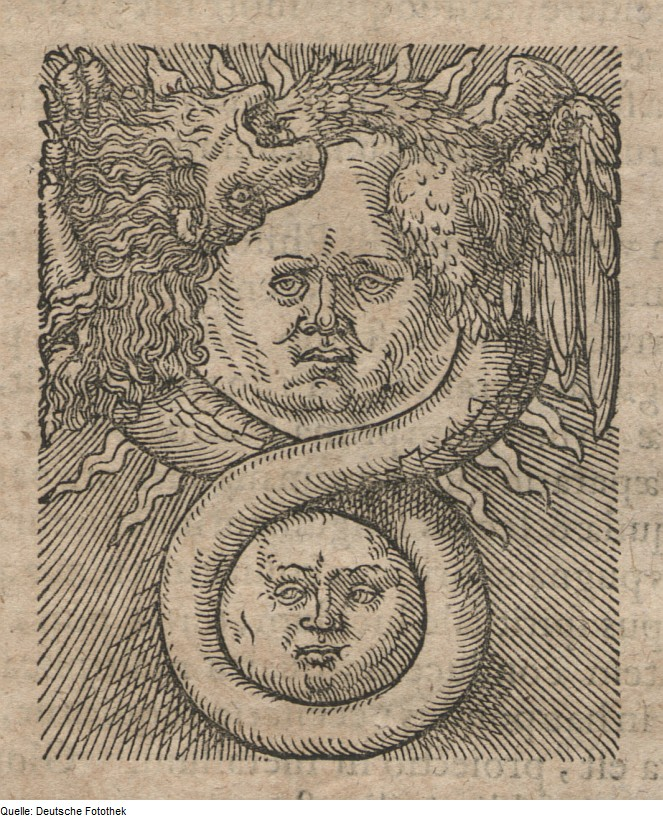
Fourth woodcut illustration from Basil Valentine's Azoth (1613)

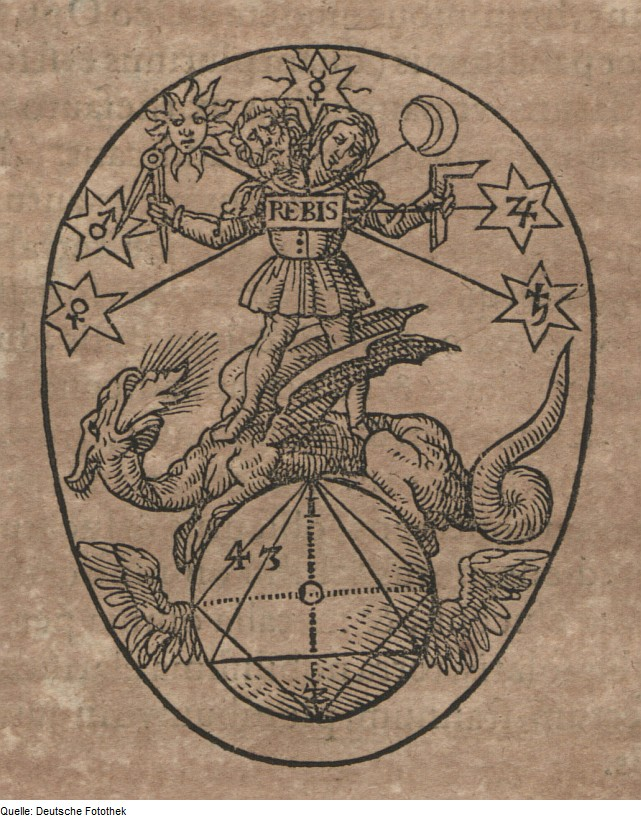
Sixth woodcut from the series in Basil Valentine's Azoth

Azoth is a universal remedy or potent solvent sought after in the realm of alchemy, akin to alkahest—a distinct alchemical substance. The quest for Azoth was the crux of numerous alchemical endeavors, symbolized by the Caduceus. Initially coined to denote an esoteric formula pursued by alchemists, akin to the Philosopher's Stone, the term Azoth later evolved into a poetic expression for the element mercury.

The scientific community does not recognize the existence of this substance. The myth of Azoth may stem from misinterpreted observations of solvents like mercury, capable of dissolving gold. Additionally, the myth might have been fueled by the occult inclinations nurtured by alchemists, who rooted and steered their chemical explorations in superstitions and dogmas.

Azoth was believed to be the essential agent of transformation in alchemy. It is the name given by ancient alchemists to mercury, which they believed to be the animating spirit hidden in all matter that makes transmutation possible. The word occurs in the writings of many early alchemists, such as Zosimos, Olympiodorus, and Jābir ibn Hayyān (Geber).

== Etymology ==
The term azoth derives from Arabic al-zāwūq (الزاووق, "mercury"), through medieval European forms such as azoc. The Arabic word is traced through Syriac zīwag to Middle Persian *zīwag, related to New Persian žīwa (ژیوه), modern jīveh (جیوه, "mercury"). Related Arabic forms, including ziʾbaq (زئبق) and zībaq (زيبق), are likewise derived from Middle Persian žīvak or zībag. The Persian origin of Arabic ziʾbaq is also recorded in the Dehkhoda Dictionary.

== Mystical traditions and philosophy ==
Azoth has also been linked to various mystical and spiritual practices beyond alchemy. In the context of Renaissance magic, it was often associated with the idea of spiritual enlightenment and the purification of the soul. Some mystical traditions regarded Azoth as a metaphor for the internal transformation required to achieve a higher state of consciousness. It was thought to embody the process of turning base human traits into divine virtues, akin to the transformation of base metals into gold. This spiritual interpretation of Azoth influenced numerous esoteric and hermetic schools of thought, contributing to its lasting legacy in Western mystical traditions. Additionally, Azoth's connection to mercury and its fluid, transformative properties also made it a symbol of adaptability and change in broader philosophical contexts.

In the Kabbalah, Azoth is related to the Ein Soph or 'the Endless One'.

== See also ==
- Anima mundi
- Panacea (medicine)
- Prima materia
- Viriditas
