= Antimony oxychloride =

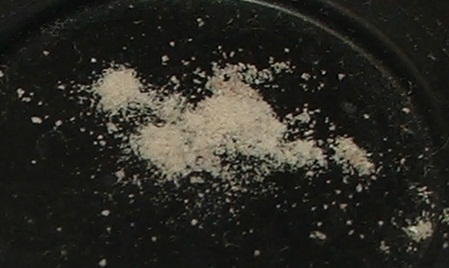

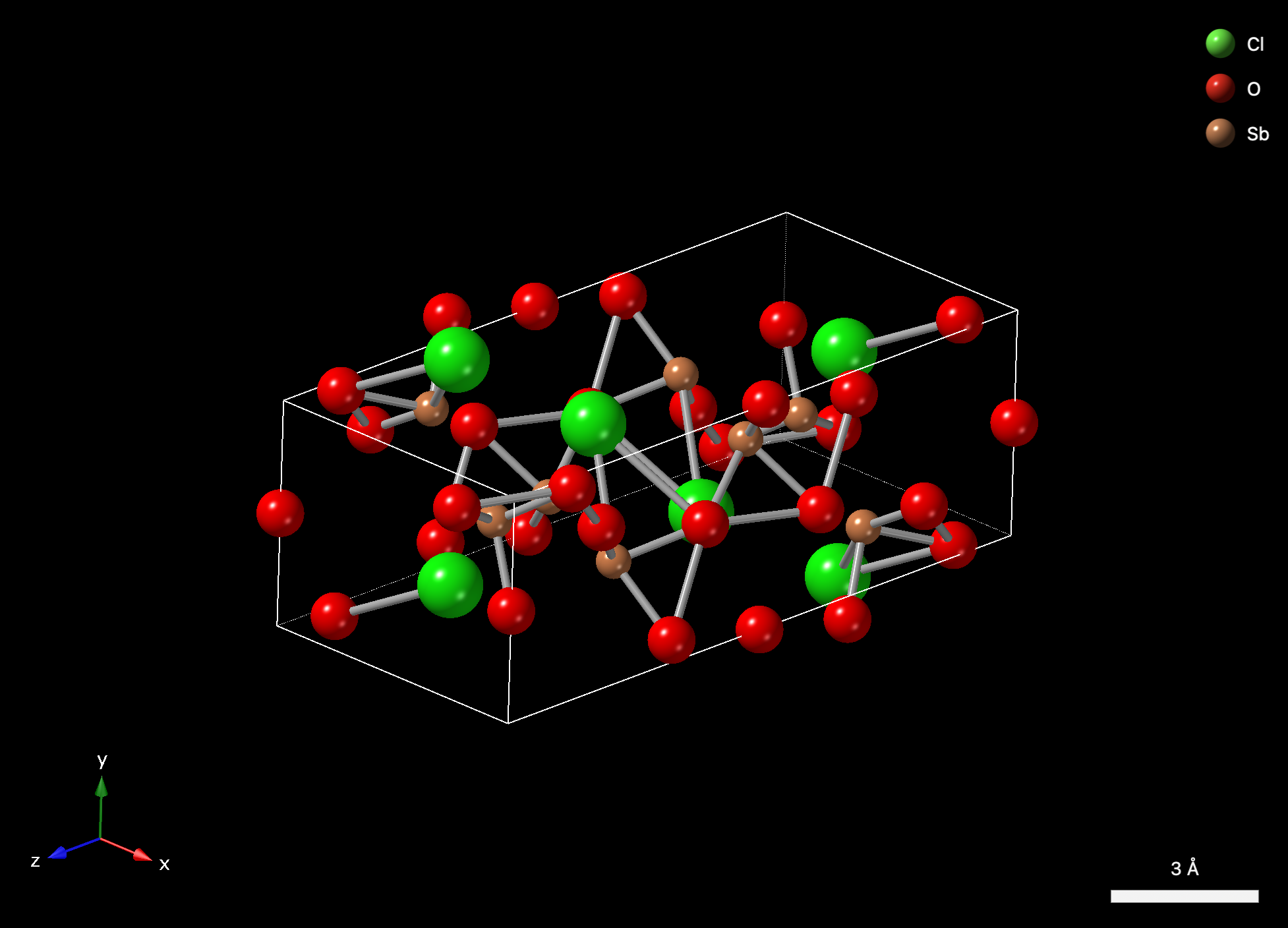
- Sb4Cl2O5 molecule created in CrystalMaker

Names
- IUPAC name antimony oxide chloride

Identifiers
CAS Number	7791-08-4; Sb_{4}O_{5}Cl_{2}: 12182-69-3
3D model (JSmol)	Interactive image; Sb_{4}O_{5}Cl_{2}: Interactive image
ChemSpider	7969749; Sb_{4}O_{5}Cl_{2}: 57524703
ECHA InfoCard	100.029.308
EC Number	232-238-8; Sb_{4}O_{5}Cl_{2}: 235-347-9
PubChem CID	9793982; Sb_{4}O_{5}Cl_{2}: 44151635
UNII	Y7P96CY2ZK
CompTox Dashboard (EPA)	DTXSID0064880; Sb_{4}O_{5}Cl_{2}: DTXSID70153375
- InChI: InChI=1S/ClH.O.Sb/h1H;;/q;-2;+3/p-1 Key: LIRSFCJKZQBJRK-UHFFFAOYSA-M; Sb_{4}O_{5}Cl_{2}: InChI=1S/2ClH.5O.4Sb/h2*1H;;;;;;;;;/q;;5*-2;4*+3/p-2 Key: QXGIXMVRTVXTKM-UHFFFAOYSA-L
- SMILES: [O-2].[Cl-].[Sb+3]; Sb_{4}O_{5}Cl_{2}: [O-2].[O-2].[O-2].[O-2].[O-2].[Cl-].[Cl-].[Sb+3].[Sb+3].[Sb+3].[Sb+3]

Properties
Chemical formula	SbOCl
Molar mass	173.21 g/mol
Melting point	280 °C (536 °F; 553 K)
Solubility in water	insoluble

Related compounds
Related compounds	Nitrosyl chloride
- Except where otherwise noted, data are given for materials in their standard state (at 25 °C [77 °F], 100 kPa). verify (what is ?) Infobox references

Antimony oxychloride, known since the 15th century, has been known by a plethora of alchemical names. Since the compound functions as both an emetic and a laxative, it was originally used as a purgative.

== History ==
Its production was first described by Basil Valentine in Currus Triumphalis Antimonii. In 1659, Johann Rudolf Glauber gave a relatively exact chemical interpretation of the reaction.

Vittorio Algarotti introduced the substance into medicine, and derivatives of his name (algarot, algoroth) were associated with this compound for many years.

The exact composition was unknown for a very long time. The suggestion of SbOCl being a mixture of antimony trichloride and antimony oxide or pure SbOCl were raised. Today the hydrolysis of antimony trichloride is understood; first the SbOCl oxychloride is formed which later forms Sb_{4}O_{5}Cl_{2}.

== Natural occurrence ==
Neither SbOCl nor the latter compound occur naturally. However, onoratoite is a known Sb-O-Cl mineral, its composition being Sb_{8}Cl_{2}O_{11}.

== Alternative historical names ==
- mercurius vitæ ("mercury of life")
- powder of algaroth
- algarel
- Pulvis angelicus.

== Synthesis ==
Dissolving antimony trichloride in water yields antimony oxychloride:

SbCl_{3} + H_{2}O → SbOCl + 2 HCl
