= Lime sulfur =

Chemical mixture used as a pest control agent

In horticulture, lime sulfur (lime sulphur in British English; see American and British English spelling differences) is mainly a mixture of calcium polysulfides and thiosulfate (plus other reaction by-products such as sulfite and sulfate), formed by reacting calcium hydroxide with elemental sulfur, and is used in pest control. It can be prepared by boiling a suspension of poorly soluble calcium hydroxide (lime) and solid sulfur in water, together with a small amount of surfactant to facilitate the dispersion of these solids. After elimination of residual solids (flocculation, decantation, and filtration), it is normally used as an aqueous solution, which is reddish-yellow in color and has a distinctive offensive odor of hydrogen sulfide (H_{2}S, rotten eggs).

== Synthesis reaction ==
The exact chemical reaction leading to the synthesis of lime sulfur is generally written as:

Ca(OH)_{2} + ^{x}/_{8} S_{8} → CaS_{x} + by-products (S_{2}O^{2−}_{3}, SO^{2−}_{3}, SO^{2−}_{4})

as reported in a document of the US Department of Agriculture (USDA).

This reaction is poorly understood because it is vague and involves the reduction of elemental sulfur, and no reductant appears in the equation, while sulfur oxidation products are also mentioned. The initial pH of the solution imposed by poorly soluble hydrated lime is alkaline (pH = 12.5) while the final pH is in the range 11–12, typical for sulfides, which are also strong bases.

When the hydrolysis of calcium sulfide is taken into account, the individual reactions for each of the by-products are:

^{1}/_{2} S_{8} + H_{2}O + 2 Ca(OH)_{2} → 2 H_{2}S + CaS_{2}O_{3}
^{3}/_{8} S_{8} + H_{2}O + 2 Ca(OH)_{2} → 2 H_{2}S + CaSO_{3}
^{1}/_{2} S_{8} + 2 H_{2}O + 2 Ca(OH)_{2} → 3 H_{2}S + CaSO_{4}

However, elemental sulfur can undergo a disproportionation reaction, also called dismutation. The first reaction resembles a disproportionation reaction. The inverse comproportionation reaction occurs in the Claus process, which is used for desulfurization of oil and gas products in the refining industry:

H_{2}S + ^{3}/_{2} O_{2} → SO_{2} + H_{2}O

By rewriting the last reaction in the inverse direction, one obtains a reaction consistent with what is observed in the overall lime sulfur reaction:

^{3}/_{8} S_{8} + 2 H_{2}O → 2 H_{2}S + SO_{2}

In alkaline conditions, it yields:

^{3}/_{8} S_{8} + 2 H_{2}O + 6 OH^{−} → 2 S^{2−} + SO^{2−}_{3} + 5 H_{2}O

and after simplification, or more precisely recycling of water molecules in the above reaction:

^{3}/_{8} S_{8} + 6 OH^{−} → 2 S^{2−} + SO^{2−}_{3} + 3 H_{2}O

Adding back 6 Ca^{2+} cations from hydrated lime for the sake of electroneutrality, one obtains the overall reaction.

This last reaction is consistent with the overall lime sulfur reaction mentioned in the USDA document. However, it does not account for all the details, such as the production of thiosulfate and sulfate among the end products of the reaction. Nevertheless, it is a good first-order approximation, and it usefully highlights the overall lime sulfur reaction scheme because the chemistry of reduced or partially oxidized forms of sulfur is particularly complex, and all the intermediate steps or involved mechanisms are hard to unravel. Moreover, once exposed to atmospheric oxygen and microbial activity, the lime sulfur system will undergo a rapid oxidation, and its different products will continue to evolve and eventually enter the natural sulfur cycle.

The presence of thiosulfate in the lime sulfur reaction can be accounted for by the reaction between sulfite and elemental sulfur (or with sulfide and polysulfides), and that of sulfate by the complete oxidation of sulfite or thiosulfate, following a more complex reaction scheme. More information on calcium thiosulfate production is described in a patent by Hajjatie et al. (2006).

Hajjatie et al. (2006) expressed the lime sulfur reaction in various ways depending on the degree of polymerization of calcium polysulfides, but the following reaction is probably the simplest of their series:

3 Ca(OH)_{2} + 6 S → 2 CaS_{2} + CaS_{2}O_{3} + 3 H_{2}O

where the S^{2−}_{2} species corresponds to the disulfide anion ^{−}S−S^{−} (with a covalent bond between the two sulfur atoms), also present in pyrite (FeS_{2}), a Fe(II) disulfide mineral.

They also successfully controlled this reaction to achieve the conversion of elemental sulfur into a quasi-pure solution of calcium thiosulfate.

== Preparation ==
The New York State Agricultural Experiment Station recipe for the concentrate suggests starting with 80 lb of sulfur, 36 lb of quicklime, and 50 gal of water, equivalent to 19.172 kg of sulfur and 8.627 kg of calcium oxide per 100 liters of water. About 2.2:1 is the ratio (by weight) for compounding sulfur and quicklime; this ratio yields the highest proportion of calcium pentasulfide. If calcium hydroxide (builders' or hydrated lime) is used, an increase of one-third or more (to 115 g/L or more) may be used with the 192 g/L of sulfur. If the quicklime is 85%, 90%, or 95% pure, 101 g/L, 96 g/L, or 91 g/L is used, respectively; if impure hydrated lime is used, its quantity is increased to compensate, though in practice lime with a purity lower than 90% is rarely used. The mixture is then boiled for one hour while being stirred, and small amounts of water are added for evaporation.

== Use ==
In agriculture and horticulture, lime sulfur is sold as a spray to control fungi, bacteria, and insects. On deciduous trees, it can be sprayed during the winter on the surface of the bark in high concentrations, but because lime sulfur can burn foliage, it must be heavily diluted before being sprayed onto herbaceous crops, especially during warm weather. Lime sulfur is approved for use on organic crops in the European Union and the United Kingdom.

Bonsai enthusiasts use undiluted lime sulfur to bleach, sterilize, and preserve deadwood on bonsai trees while giving it an aged look. Rather than being sprayed over the entire tree, as in pesticidal use, lime sulfur is painted directly onto the exposed deadwood and is often colored with a small amount of dark paint to make it look more natural. Without added pigments, the lime sulfur solution bleaches wood to a bone-white color that takes time to weather and become natural-looking. In the very specific case of bonsai culture, if lime sulfur is carefully applied by hand with a small brush and does not come into direct contact with the leaves or needles, this technique can also be used on evergreen bonsai trees as well as other types of green trees. However, this does not apply to normal use on common trees with green leaves.

Diluted solutions of lime sulfur (between 1:16 and 1:32) are also used as a dip for pets to help control ringworm (a fungus), mange, and other dermatoses and parasites. Undiluted lime sulfur is corrosive to the skin and eyes and can cause serious injury, such as blindness.

== Safety ==
Lime sulfur reacts with strong acids (including stomach acid) to produce highly toxic hydrogen sulfide (rotten egg gas) and usually has a distinct "rotten egg" odor. Lime sulfur is not flammable, but it can release highly irritating sulfur dioxide gas in a fire.

Safety goggles and impervious gloves should be worn when handling lime sulfur. Lime sulfur solutions are strongly alkaline (typical commercial concentrates have a pH over 11.5 because of the presence of dissolved sulfides and hydroxide anions) and are harmful to living organisms and can cause blindness if splashed in the eyes.

The corrosive nature of lime sulfur is due to the reduced sulfur species it contains, in particular sulfides responsible for stress corrosion cracking and the thiosulfates that cause pitting corrosion. Localized corrosion by the reduced sulfur species can be significant; even the mere presence of elemental sulfur in contact with metals is enough to corrode them considerably, including so-called stainless steels.

== History ==
Lime sulfur is believed to be the earliest synthetic chemical used as a pesticide, having been used in France in the 1840s in order to control grapevine powdery mildew, Uncinula necator, which was introduced from the United States in 1845 and reduced wine production by 80%. In 1886, it was first used in California to control San Jose scale. Beginning around 1904, commercial suppliers began to manufacture lime sulfur; prior to that time, gardeners were expected to manufacture their own. By the 1920s, essentially all commercial orchards in Western countries were protected by regular spraying with lime sulfur. However, by the 1940s, lime sulfur began to be replaced by synthetic organic fungicides that posed less risk of damage to the crop's foliage.

== See also ==
- Claus process
