= Chrome yellow =

Chemical compound and pigment

Colour coordinates
- Hex triplet: #FFA700
- sRGB^{B} (r, g, b): (255, 167, 0)
- HSV (h, s, v): (39°, 100%, 100%)
- CIELCh_{uv} (L, C, h): (75, 105, 46°)
- Source: ColorHexa
- ISCC–NBS descriptor: Strong orange yellow
- B: Normalized to [0–255] (byte)

Chrome yellow is a bright, warm yellow pigment that has been used in paints (lead paints), industry, chemistry, art and fashion. It is the premier orange pigment for many applications. It derives from the mineral crocoite, which consists of pure lead chromate (PbCrO_{4}).

== Production of chrome yellow and related pigments ==
The raw pigment precipitates as a fine solid upon mixing lead(II) salts and a source of chromate. Approximately 90,000 tons of chrome yellow are produced annually as of 2001.

Chrome yellow pigments are usually encapsulated by coating with transparent oxides that protect the pigment from environmental factors that would diminish their colorant properties.

Related lead sulfochromate pigments are produced by the replacement of some chromate by sulfate, resulting in a mixed lead-chromate-sulfate compositions Pb(CrO_{4})_{1-x}(SO_{4})_{x}. This replacement is possible because sulfate and chromate are isostructural. Since sulfate is colorless, sulfochromates with high values of x are less intensely colored than lead chromate. In some cases, chromate is replaced by molybdate.

== Permanence ==
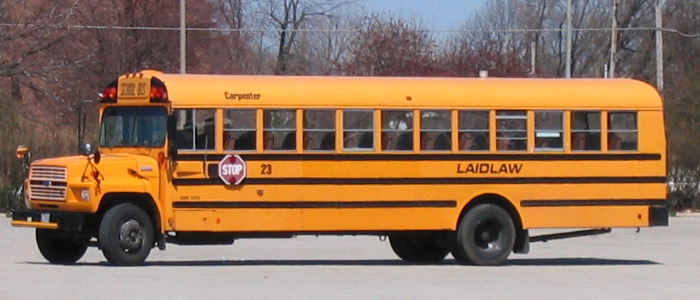
American school bus, painted in dark chrome yellow

Chrome yellow is moderately resistant to fading from exposure to light when it is chemically pure. Observations have found that over time though, it begins to darken and suffer discoloration by turning brown. This degradation is seen in some of Van Gogh's pieces. According to Gettens, especially when mixed with organic colors, it can take on a green tone. This effect is attributed to reduction of some chromate to chromium(III) oxide. Owing to its high lead content, the pigment is prone to discoloration over time, particularly in the presence of sulfur compounds. Its low cost had doubtlessly contributed to its continued use as an artists' color even though some subsequently discovered yellow pigments are more permanent. Artists began using cadmium yellow instead of chrome yellow when they became aware of chrome yellow's instability.

The pigment tends to react with hydrogen sulfide and darken on exposure to air over time, forming lead sulfide, and it contains the toxic heavy metal lead plus the toxic, carcinogenic chromate. For these reasons, it was replaced by another pigment, cadmium yellow (mixed with enough cadmium orange to produce a color equivalent to chrome yellow). Darkening may also occur from reduction by sulfur dioxide. Good quality pigments have been coated to inhibit contact with gases that can change their color. Cadmium pigments in turn are increasingly replaced with organic pigments such as arylides (Pigment Yellow 65) and isoindoles (PY 110).

== Notable occurrences ==
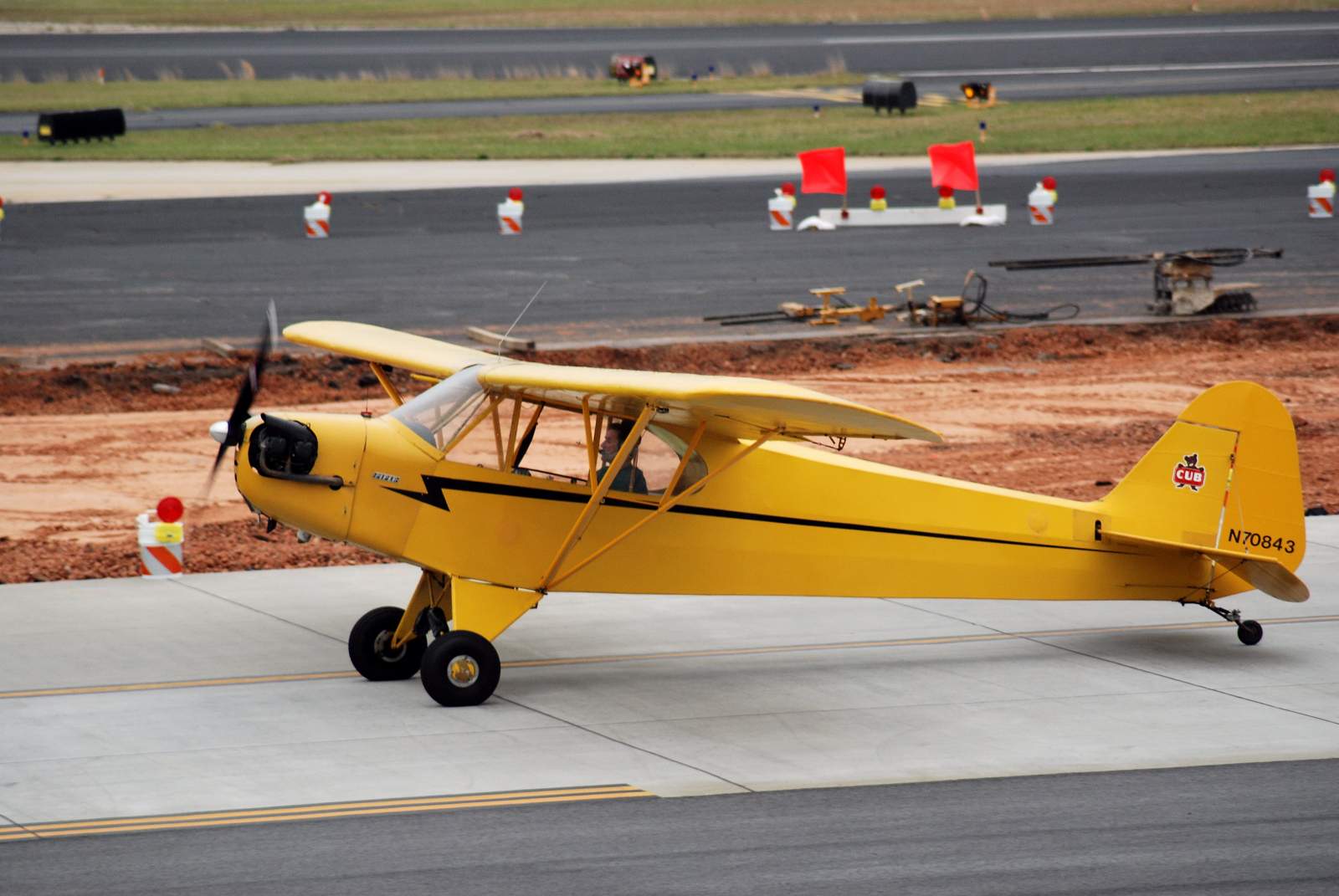
Piper J-3 Cub in chrome yellow standard color

Vincent van Gogh used chrome yellow in many of his paintings, including his famous Sunflowers series. Studies focusing on the techniques used in Van Gogh's Sunflowers series have revealed how Van Gogh skillfully mixed various shades of chrome yellow to achieve different effects. Chrome yellow has also been used in fashion and textiles, particularly in the 1920s and 1930s. The vibrant color was a popular choice for flapper dresses, hats, and accessories, and was often paired with other bright colors, such as pink and turquoise.

== History ==
The pigment is derived from lead chromate, a chemical compound that was first synthesized in the early 1800s. The discovery of lead chromate, the primary component of chrome yellow, is credited to the French chemist Louis Nicolas Vauquelin. Vauquelin was studying the mineral crocoite, a natural form of lead chromate, when he identified the presence of a new element, chromium. The discovery led to the synthesis of a variety of new pigments, including chrome yellow. Chrome yellow quickly gained popularity among artists and designers for its bright, sunny hue, which was particularly well-suited for use in fashion and textiles. The earliest known use of chrome yellow in a painting is a work by Sir Thomas Lawrence from before 1810. The first recorded use of chrome yellow as a color name in English was in 1818. The pigment was also widely used in industrial applications, such as in the production of paint, plastics, and ceramics.

== Safety ==
Because it contains not only lead but hexavalent chromium, chrome yellow has long been the focus on safety concerns. Its use is highly regulated. Its former use as a food colorant has long been discontinued. The continued wide use of this pigment is attributed to its very low solubility, which suppresses leaching of chromate and lead into biological fluids. The LD_{50} for rats is 5 g/kg.

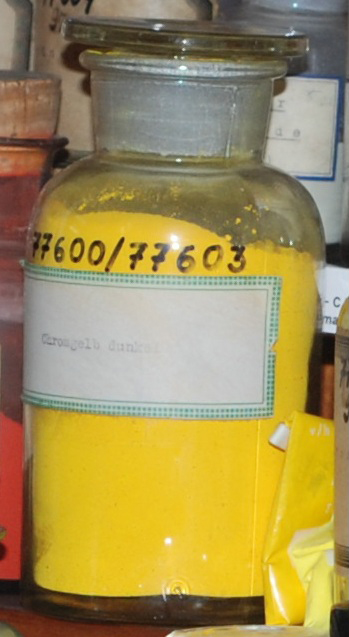
Chrome yellow

== See also ==
- Lead chromate
- Crocoite
- List of colors
- List of inorganic pigments
- School bus yellow – Color used on North American school buses
