= Forensic chemistry =

Forensic application of the study of chemistry

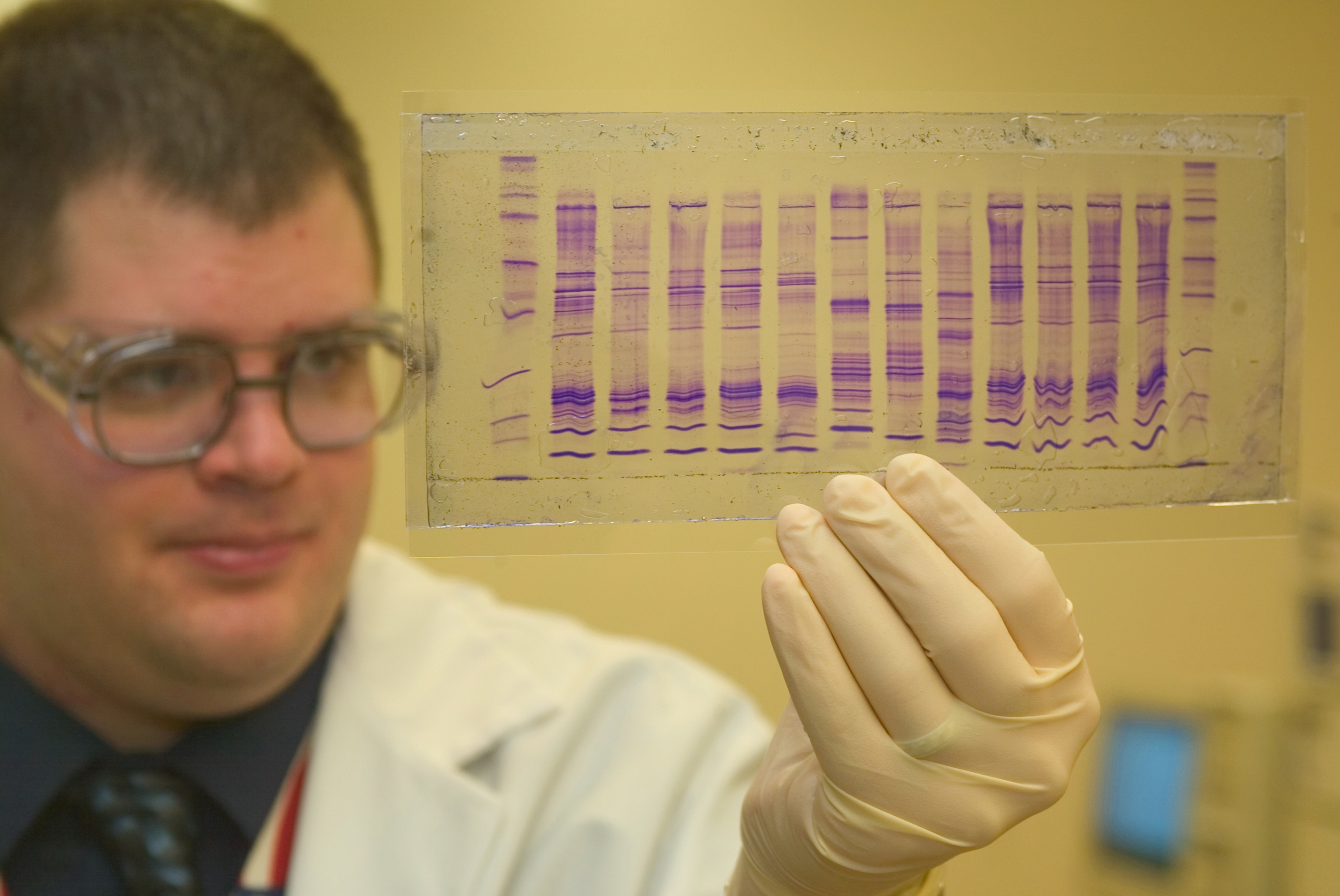
A U.S. Customs and Border Protection chemist reads a DNA profile to determine the origin of a commodity

Forensic chemistry is the application of chemistry and its subfield, forensic toxicology, in a legal setting. It involves the identification, analysis, and interpretation of substances such as drugs, toxin, accelerants, and unknown materials recovered from crimes scenes or biological samples. A forensic chemist can assist in the identification of unknown materials found at a crime scene. Specialists in this field have a wide array of methods and instruments to help identify unknown substances. These include high-performance liquid chromatography, gas chromatography-mass spectrometry, atomic absorption spectroscopy, Fourier transform infrared spectroscopy, and thin layer chromatography. The range of different methods is important due to the destructive nature of some instruments and the number of possible unknown substances that can be found at a scene. Forensic chemists prefer using nondestructive methods first, to preserve evidence and to determine which destructive methods will produce the best results.

Along with other forensic specialists, forensic chemists commonly testify in court as expert witnesses regarding their findings. Forensic chemists follow a set of standards that have been proposed by various agencies and governing bodies, including the Scientific Working Group on the Analysis of Seized Drugs. In addition to the standard operating procedures proposed by the group, specific agencies have their own standards regarding the quality assurance and quality control of their results and their instruments. To ensure the accuracy of what they are reporting, forensic chemists routinely check and verify that their instruments are working correctly and are still able to detect and measure various quantities of different substances.

== Role in investigations ==
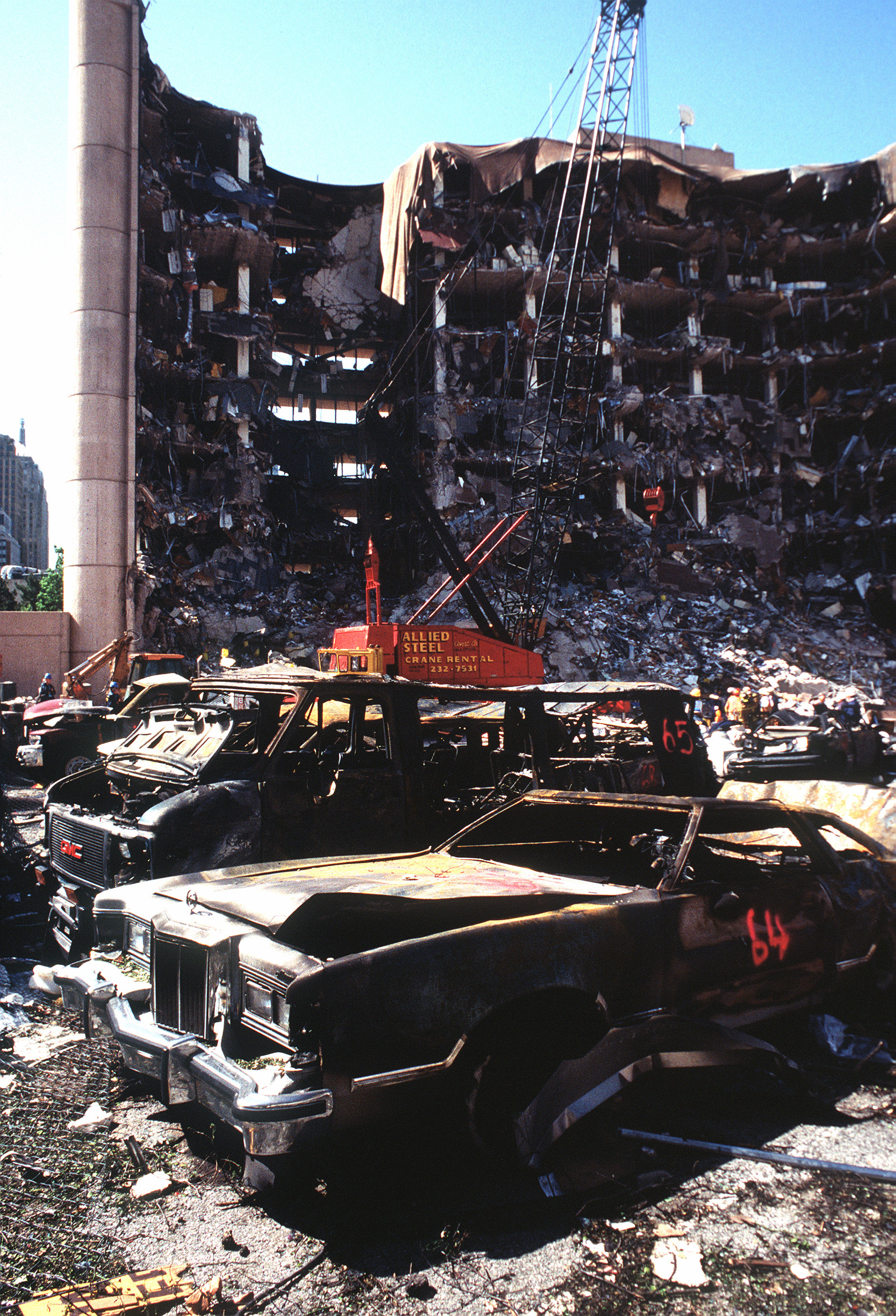
Chemists were able to identify the explosive ANFO at the scene of the Oklahoma City bombing.

Forensic chemists' analysis can provide leads for investigators, and they can confirm or refute their suspicions. The identification of the various substances found at the scene can tell investigators what to look for during their search. During fire investigations, forensic chemists can determine if an accelerant such as gasoline or kerosene was used; if so, this suggests that the fire was intentionally set. Forensic chemists can also narrow down the suspect list to people who would have access to the substance used in a crime. For example, in explosive investigations, the identification of RDX or C-4 would indicate a military connection as those substances are military grade explosives. On the other hand, the identification of TNT would create a wider suspect list, since it is used by demolition companies as well as in the military. During poisoning investigations, the detection of specific poisons can give detectives an idea of what to look for when they are interviewing potential suspects. For example, an investigation that involves ricin would tell investigators to look for ricin's precursors, the seeds of the castor oil plant.

Forensic chemists also help to confirm or refute investigators' suspicions in drug or alcohol cases. The instruments used by forensic chemists can detect minute quantities, and accurate measurement can be important in crimes such as driving under the influence as there are specific blood alcohol content cutoffs where penalties begin or increase. In suspected overdose cases, the quantity of the drug found in the person's system can confirm or rule out overdose as the cause of death.

== History ==
=== Early history ===
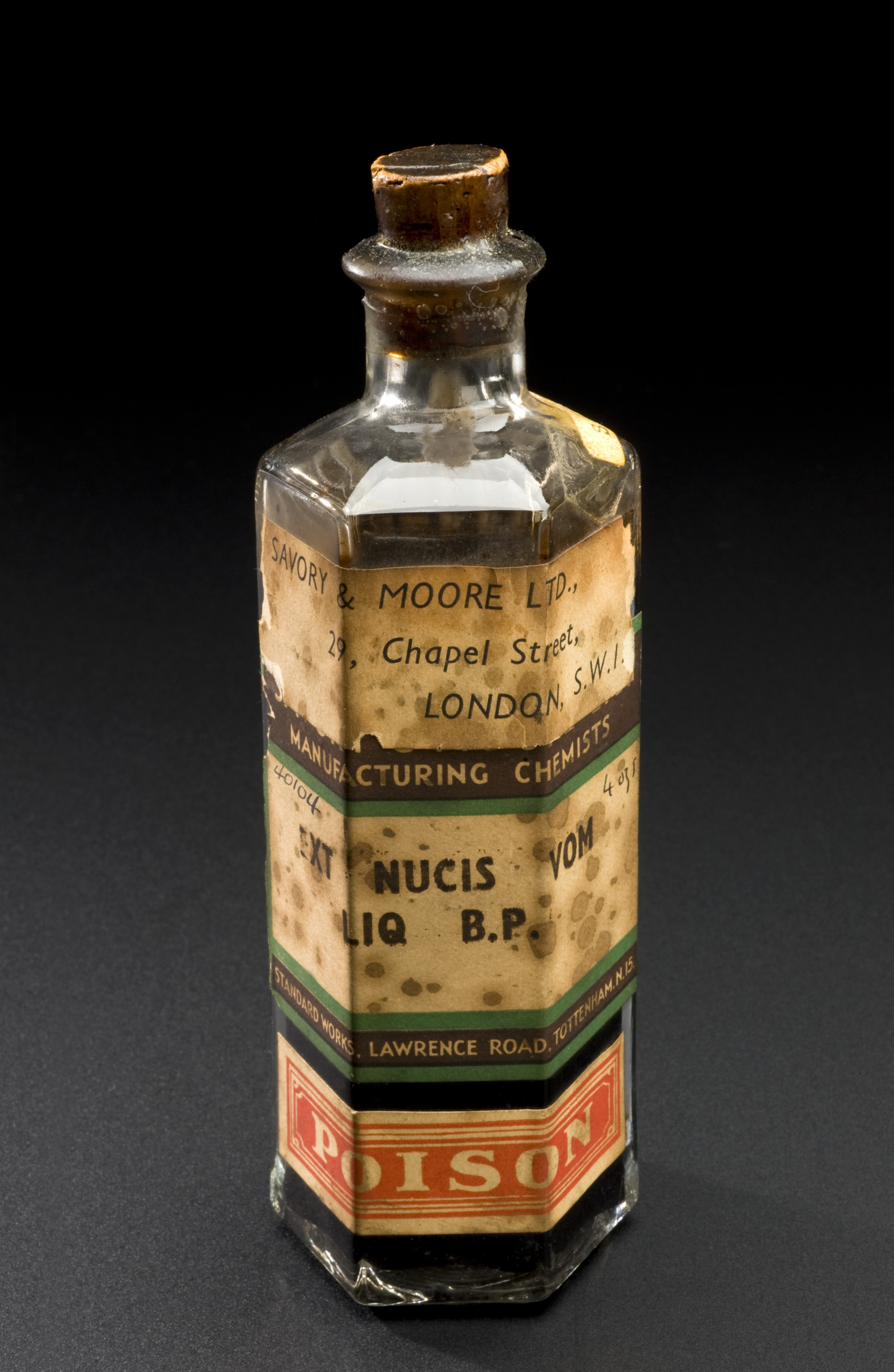
A bottle of strychnine extract was once easily obtainable in apothecaries.

Throughout history, a variety of poisons have been used to commit murder, including arsenic, nightshade, hemlock, strychnine, and curare. Until the early 19th century, there were no methods to accurately determine if a particular chemical was present, and poisoners were rarely punished for their crimes. In 1836, one of the first major contributions to forensic chemistry was introduced by British chemist James Marsh. He created the Marsh test for arsenic detection, which was subsequently used successfully in a murder trial. It was also during this time that forensic toxicology began to be recognized as a distinct field. Mathieu Orfila, the "father of toxicology", made great advancements to the field during the early 19th century. A pioneer in the development of forensic microscopy, Orfila contributed to the advancement of this method for the detection of blood and semen. Orfila was also the first chemist to successfully classify different chemicals into categories such as corrosives, narcotics, and astringents.

The next advancement in the detection of poisons came in 1850 when a valid method for detecting vegetable alkaloids in human tissue was created by chemist Jean Stas. Stas's method was quickly adopted and used successfully in court to convict Count Hippolyte Visart de Bocarmé of murdering his brother-in-law by nicotine poisoning. Stas was able to successfully isolate the alkaloid from the organs of the victim. Stas's protocol was subsequently altered to incorporate tests for caffeine, quinine, morphine, strychnine, atropine, and opium.

The wide range of instrumentation for forensic chemical analysis also began to be developed during this time period. The early 19th century saw the invention of the spectroscope by Joseph von Fraunhofer. In 1859, chemist Robert Bunsen and physicist Gustav Kirchhoff expanded on Fraunhofer's invention. Their experiments with spectroscopy showed that specific substances created a unique spectrum when exposed to specific wavelengths of light. Using spectroscopy, the two scientists were able to identify substances based on their spectrum, providing a method of identification for unknown materials. In 1906 botanist Mikhail Tsvet invented paper chromatography, an early predecessor to thin layer chromatography, and used it to separate and examine the plant proteins that make up chlorophyll. The ability to separate mixtures into their individual components allows forensic chemists to examine the parts of an unknown material against a database of known products. By matching the retention factors for the separated components with known values, materials can be identified.

=== Modernization ===
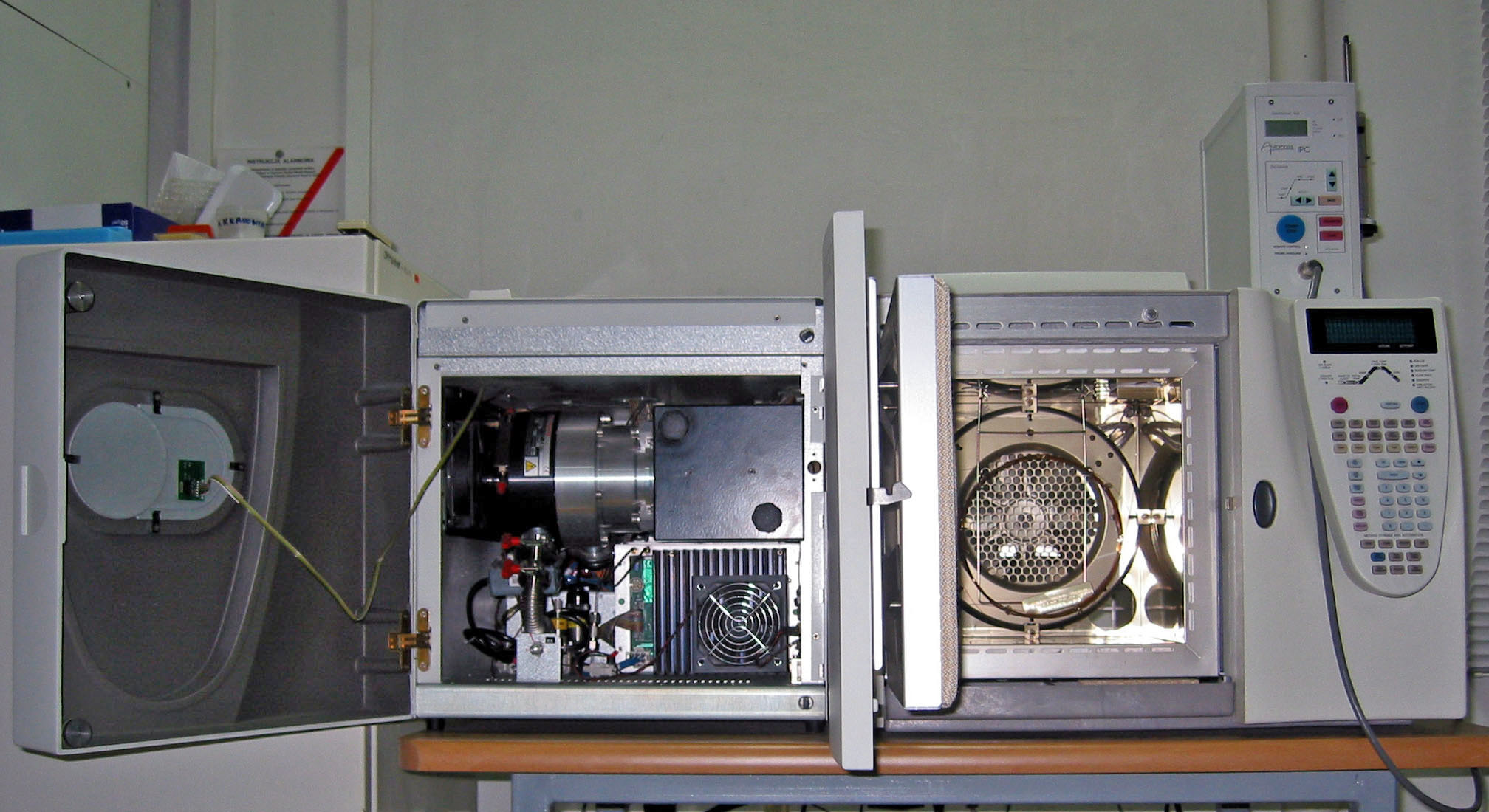
A GC-MS unit with doors open. The gas chromatograph is on the right and the mass spectrometer is on the left.

Modern forensic chemists rely on numerous instruments to identify unknown materials found at a crime scene. The 20th century saw many advancements in technology that allowed chemists to detect smaller amounts of material more accurately. The first major advancement in this century came during the 1930s with the invention of a spectrometer that could measure the signal produced with infrared (IR) light. Early IR spectrometers used a monochromator and could only measure light absorption in a very narrow wavelength band. It was not until the coupling of an interferometer with an IR spectrometer in 1949 by Peter Fellgett that the complete infrared spectrum could be measured at once. Fellgett also used the Fourier transform, a mathematical method that can break down a signal into its individual frequencies, to make sense of the enormous amount of data received from the complete infrared analysis of a material. Since then, Fourier transform infrared spectroscopy (FTIR) instruments have become critical in the forensic analysis of unknown material because they are nondestructive and extremely quick to use. Spectroscopy was further advanced in 1955 with the invention of the modern atomic absorption (AA) spectrophotometer by Alan Walsh. AA analysis can detect specific elements that make up a sample along with their concentrations, allowing for the easy detection of heavy metals such as arsenic and cadmium.

Advancements in the field of chromatography arrived in 1953 with the invention of the gas chromatograph by Anthony T. James and Archer John Porter Martin, allowing for the separation of volatile liquid mixtures with components which have similar boiling points. Nonvolatile liquid mixtures could be separated with liquid chromatography, but substances with similar retention times could not be resolved until the invention of high-performance liquid chromatography (HPLC) by Csaba Horváth in 1970. Modern HPLC instruments are capable of detecting and resolving substances whose concentrations are as low as parts per trillion.

One of the most important advancements in forensic chemistry came in 1955 with the invention of gas chromatography-mass spectrometry (GC-MS) by Fred McLafferty and Roland Gohlke. The coupling of a gas chromatograph with a mass spectrometer allowed for the identification of a wide range of substances. GC-MS analysis is widely considered the "gold standard" for forensic analysis due to its sensitivity and versatility along with its ability to quantify the amount of substance present. The increase in the sensitivity of instrumentation has advanced to the point that minute impurities within compounds can be detected potentially allowing investigators to trace chemicals to a specific batch and lot from a manufacturer.

== Methods ==
Forensic chemists rely on a multitude of instruments to identify unknown substances found at a scene. Different methods can be used to determine the identity of the same substance, and it is up to the examiner to determine which method will produce the best results. Factors that forensic chemists might consider when performing an examination are the length of time a specific instrument will take to examine a substance and the destructive nature of that instrument. They prefer using nondestructive methods first, to preserve the evidence for further examination. Nondestructive techniques can also be used to narrow down the possibilities, making it more likely that the correct method will be used the first time when a destructive method is used.

=== Spectroscopy ===
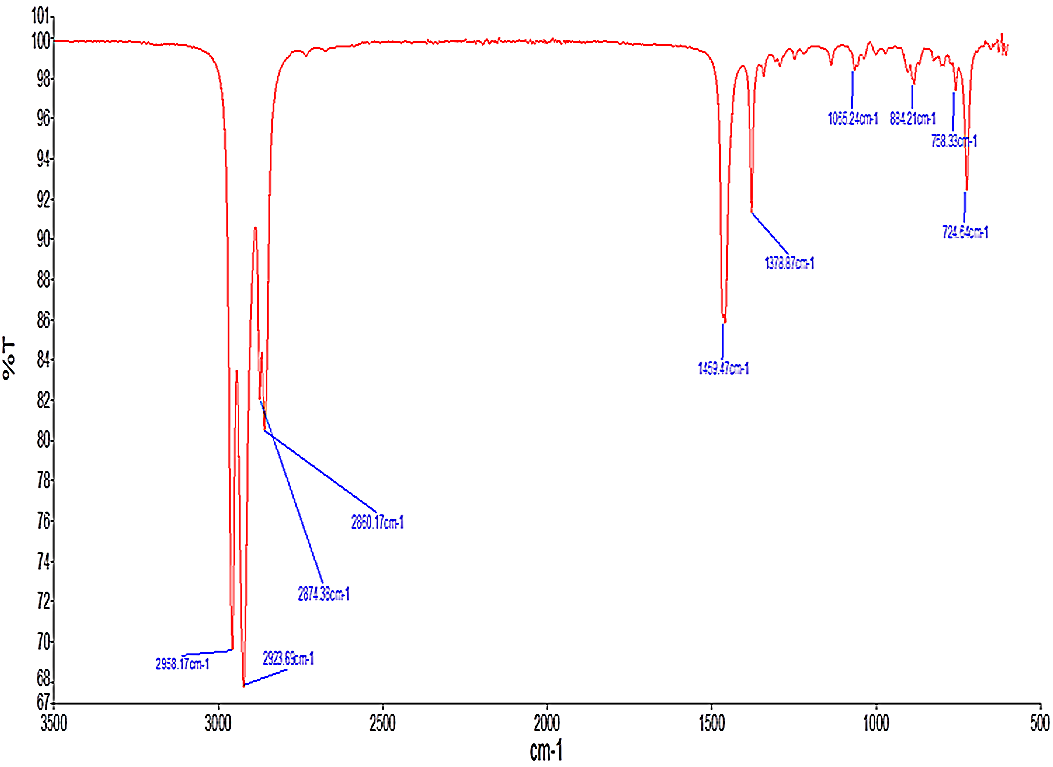
ATR FTIR spectrum for hexane showing percent transmittance (%T) versus wavenumber (cm^{−1}).

The two main standalone spectroscopy techniques for forensic chemistry are FTIR and AA spectroscopy. FTIR is a nondestructive process that uses infrared light to identify a substance. The attenuated total reflectance sampling technique eliminates the need for substances to be prepared before analysis. The combination of nondestructiveness and zero preparation makes ATR FTIR analysis a quick and easy first step in the analysis of unknown substances. To facilitate the positive identification of the substance, FTIR instruments are loaded with databases that can be searched for known spectra that match the unknown's spectra. FTIR analysis of mixtures, while not impossible, presents specific difficulties due to the cumulative nature of the response. When analyzing an unknown that contains more than one substance, the resulting spectra will be a combination of the individual spectra of each component. While common mixtures have known spectra on file, novel mixtures can be difficult to resolve, making FTIR an unacceptable means of identification. However, the instrument can be used to determine the general chemical structures present, allowing forensic chemists to determine the best method for analysis with other instruments. For example, a methoxy group will result in a peak between 3,030 and 2,950 wavenumbers (cm^{−1}).

Atomic absorption spectroscopy (AAS) is a destructive technique that is able to determine the elements that make up the analyzed sample. AAS performs this analysis by subjecting the sample to an extremely high heat source, breaking the atomic bonds of the substance, leaving free atoms. Radiation in the form of light is then passed through the sample forcing the atoms to jump to a higher energy state. Forensic chemists can test for each element by using a corresponding wavelength of light that forces that element's atoms to a higher energy state during the analysis. For this reason, and due to the destructive nature of this method, AAS is generally used as a confirmatory technique after preliminary tests have indicated the presence of a specific element in the sample. The concentration of the element in the sample is proportional to the amount of light absorbed when compared to a blank sample. AAS is useful in cases of suspected heavy metal poisoning such as with arsenic, lead, mercury, and cadmium. The concentration of the substance in the sample can indicate whether heavy metals were the cause of death.

=== Chromatography ===
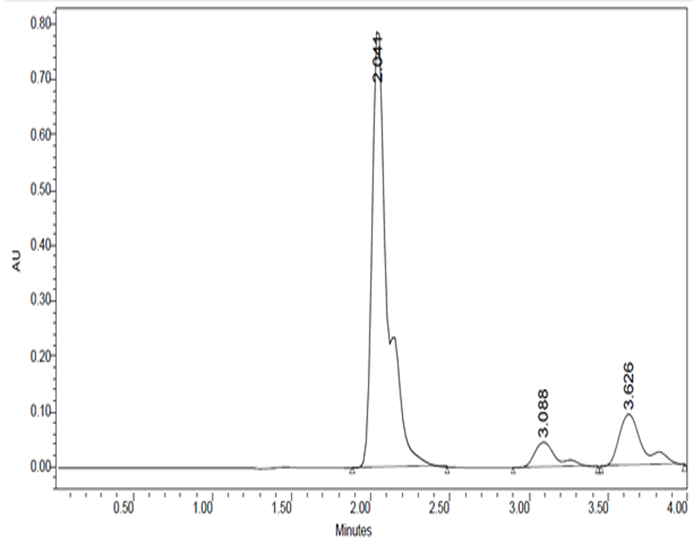
HPLC readout of an Excedrin tablet. Peaks from left to right are acetaminophen, aspirin, and caffeine.

Spectroscopy techniques are useful when the sample being tested is pure, or a very common mixture. When an unknown mixture is being analyzed it must be broken down into its individual parts. Chromatography techniques can be used to break apart mixtures into their components allowing for each part to be analyzed separately.

Thin layer chromatography (TLC) is a quick alternative to more complex chromatography methods. TLC can be used to analyze inks and dyes by extracting the individual components. This can be used to investigate notes or fibers left at the scene since each company's product is slightly different and those differences can be seen with TLC. The only limiting factor with TLC analysis is the necessity for the components to be soluble in whatever solution is used to carry the components up the analysis plate. This solution is called the mobile phase. The forensic chemist can compare unknowns with known standards by looking at the distance each component travelled. This distance, when compared to the starting point, is known as the retention factor (R_{f}) for each extracted component. If each R_{f} value matches a known sample, that is an indication of the unknown's identity.

High-performance liquid chromatography (HPLC) can be used to extract individual components from a mixture dissolved in a solution. HPLC is used for nonvolatile mixtures that would not be suitable for gas chromatography. This is useful in drug analysis where the pharmaceutical is a combination drug since the components would separate, or elute, at different times allowing for the verification of each component. The eluates from the HPLC column are then fed into various detectors that produce a peak on a graph relative to its concentration as it elutes off the column. The most common type of detector is an ultraviolet-visible spectrometer as the most common item of interest tested with HPLC, pharmaceuticals, have UV absorbance.

Gas chromatography (GC) performs the same function as liquid chromatography, but it is used for volatile mixtures. In forensic chemistry, the most common GC instruments use mass spectrometry as their detector. GC-MS can be used in investigations of arson, poisoning, and explosions to determine exactly what was used. In theory, GC-MS instruments can detect substances whose concentrations are in the femtogram (10^{−15}) range. However, in practice, due to signal-to-noise ratios and other limiting factors, such as the age of the individual parts of the instrument, the practical detection limit for GC-MS is in the picogram (10^{−12}) range. GC-MS is also capable of quantifying the substances it detects; chemists can use this information to determine the effect the substance would have on an individual. GC-MS instruments need around 1,000 times more of the substance to quantify the amount than they need simply to detect it; the limit of quantification is typically in the nanogram (10^{−9}) range.

== Forensic toxicology ==
Forensic toxicology is the study of the pharmacodynamics, or what a substance does to the body, and pharmacokinetics, or what the body does to the substance. To accurately determine the effect a particular drug has on the human body, forensic toxicologists must be aware of various levels of drug tolerance that an individual can build up as well as the therapeutic index for various pharmaceuticals. Toxicologists are tasked with determining whether any toxin found in a body was the cause of or contributed to an incident, or whether it was at too low a level to have had an effect. While the determination of the specific toxin can be time-consuming due to the number of different substances that can cause injury or death, certain clues can narrow down the possibilities. For example, carbon monoxide poisoning would result in bright red blood while death from hydrogen sulfide poisoning would cause the brain to have a green hue.

Toxicologists are also aware of the different metabolites that a specific drug could break down into inside the body. For example, a toxicologist can confirm that a person took heroin by the presence in a sample of 6-monoacetylmorphine, which only comes from the breakdown of heroin. The constant creation of new drugs, both legal and illicit, forces toxicologists to keep themselves apprised of new research and methods to test for these novel substances. The stream of new formulations means that a negative test result does not necessarily rule out drugs. To avoid detection, illicit drug manufacturers frequently change the chemicals' structure slightly. These compounds are often not detected by routine toxicology tests and can be masked by the presence of a known compound in the same sample. As new compounds are discovered, known spectra are determined and entered into the databases that can be downloaded and used as reference standards. Laboratories also tend to keep in-house databases for the substances they find locally.

== Standards ==
SWGDRUG analysis categories
Category A	Category B	Category C
Infrared spectroscopy; Mass spectrometry; Nuclear magnetic resonance spectroscopy; Raman spectroscopy; X-ray diffractometry	Capillary electrophoresis; Gas chromatography; Ion-mobility spectrometry; Liquid chromatography; Microcrystalline tests; Pharmaceutical identifiers; Thin-layer chromatography; Cannabis only: Macroscopic and microscopic examination	Color tests; Fluorescence spectroscopy; Immunoassay; Melting point analysis; Ultraviolet spectroscopy

Guidelines have been set up by various governing bodies regarding the standards that are followed by practicing forensic scientists. For forensic chemists, the international Scientific Working Group for the Analysis of Seized Drugs (SWGDRUG) presents recommendations for the quality assurance and quality control of tested materials. In the identification of unknown samples, protocols have been grouped into three categories based on the probability for false positives. Instruments and protocols in category A are considered the best for uniquely identifying an unknown material, followed by categories B and then C. To ensure the accuracy of identifications SWGDRUG recommends that multiple tests using different instruments be performed on each sample, and that one category A technique and at least one other technique be used. If a category A technique is not available, or the forensic chemist decides not to use one, SWGDRUG recommends that at least three techniques be used, two of which must be from category B. Combination instruments, such as GC-MS, are considered two separate tests as long as the results are compared to known values individually For example, the GC elution times would be compared to known values along with the MS spectra. If both of those match a known substance, no further tests are needed.

Standards and controls are necessary in the quality control of the various instruments used to test samples. Due to the nature of their work in the legal system, chemists must ensure that their instruments are working accurately. To do this, known controls are tested consecutively with unknown samples. By comparing the readouts of the controls with their known profiles the instrument can be confirmed to have been working properly at the time the unknowns were tested. Standards are also used to determine the instrument's limit of detection and limit of quantification for various common substances. Calculated quantities must be above the limit of detection to be confirmed as present and above the limit of quantification to be quantified. If the value is below the limit the value is not considered reliable.

=== Testimony ===
The standardized procedures for testimony by forensic chemists are provided by the various agencies that employ the scientists as well as SWGDRUG. Forensic chemists are ethically bound to present testimony in a neutral manner and to be open to reconsidering their statements if new information is found. Chemists should also limit their testimony to areas they have been qualified in regardless of questions during direct or cross-examination.

Individuals called to testify must be able to relay scientific information and processes in a manner that lay individuals can understand. By being qualified as an expert, chemists are allowed to give their opinions on the evidence as opposed to just stating the facts. This can lead to competing opinions from experts hired by the opposing side. Ethical guidelines for forensic chemists require that testimony be given in an objective manner, regardless of what side the expert is testifying for. Forensic experts that are called to testify are expected to work with the lawyer who issued the summons and to assist in their understanding of the material they will be asking questions about.

=== Education ===
Forensic chemistry positions require a bachelor's degree or similar in a natural or physical science, as well as laboratory experience in general, organic, and analytical chemistry. Once in the position, individuals are trained in protocols performed at that specific lab until they are proven competent to perform all experiments without supervision. Practicing chemists in the field are expected to complete continuing education to maintain their proficiency.
