= Devarda's alloy =

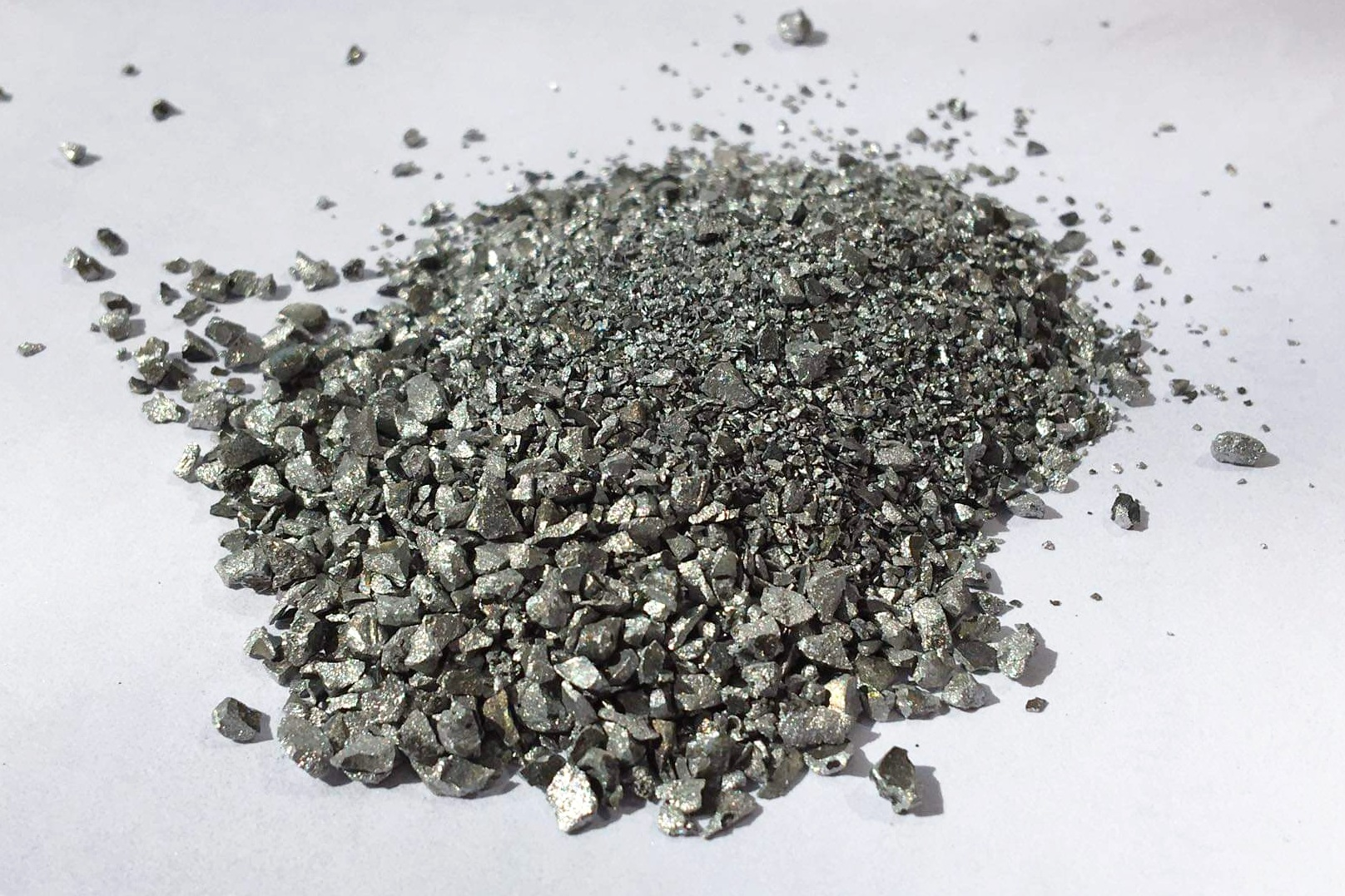

Identifiers
CAS Number	8049-11-4
ChemSpider	none
ECHA InfoCard	100.209.703
PubChem CID	16211762
UNII	GSX651880X
CompTox Dashboard (EPA)	DTXSID50583479

Properties
Density	5.79 g/cm^{3}
Melting point	490 to 560 °C (914 to 1,040 °F; 763 to 833 K)
Boiling point	906 °C (1,663 °F; 1,179 K)
Solubility in water	insoluble

Hazards
- GHS labelling
Pictograms	(GHS02: Flammable)
Signal word	Warning
Hazard statements	H228
Precautionary statements	P210, P240, P241, P280, P378
- Except where otherwise noted, data are given for materials in their standard state (at 25 °C [77 °F], 100 kPa). Infobox references

Devarda's alloy (CAS # 8049-11-4) is an alloy of aluminium (44% – 46%), copper (49% – 51%) and zinc (4% – 6%).

Devarda's alloy is used as reducing agent in analytical chemistry for the determination of nitrates after their reduction to ammonia under alkaline conditions. It is named for Italian chemist Arturo Devarda (1859–1944), who synthesised it at the end of the 19th century to develop a new method to analyze nitrate in Chile saltpeter.

It was often used in the quantitative or qualitative analysis of nitrates in agriculture and soil science before the development of ion chromatography, the predominant analysis method largely adopted worldwide today.

== General mechanism ==
When a solution of nitrate ions is mixed with aqueous sodium hydroxide, adding Devarda's alloy and heating the mixture gently, liberates ammonia gas. After conversion under the form of ammonia, the total nitrogen is then determined by Kjeldahl method.

The reduction of nitrate by the Devarda's alloy is given by the following equation:

3 NO^{−}_{3} + 8 Al + 5 OH^{−} + 18 H_{2}O → 3 NH_{3} + 8 [Al(OH)_{4}]^{−}

== Distinction between NO_{3}^{−} and NO_{2}^{−} with spot tests ==
To distinguish between nitrate and nitrite, dilute HCl must be added to the nitrate. The brown ring test can also be used.

== Similarity with the Marsh test ==
Devarda's alloy is a reducing agent that was commonly used in wet analytical chemistry to produce so-called nascent hydrogen under alkaline conditions in situ. In the Marsh test, used for arsenic determination, hydrogen is generated by contacting zinc powder with hydrochloric acid. So, hydrogen can be conveniently produced at low or high pH, according to the volatility of the species to be detected. Acid conditions in the Marsh test promote the fast escape of the arsine gas (AsH_{3}), while in hyperalkaline solution, the degassing of the reduced ammonia (NH_{3}) is greatly facilitated.

== Long-debated question of the nascent hydrogen ==
Since the mid-19th century the existence of true nascent hydrogen has repeatedly been challenged. It was assumed by the supporters of this theory that, before two hydrogen atoms can recombine into a more stable H_{2} molecule, the labile H· free radicals are more reactive than molecular H_{2}, a relatively weak reductant in the absence of a metal catalyst. Nascent hydrogen was supposed to be responsible for the reduction of arsenate or nitrate in arsine or ammonia respectively. Nowadays, isotopic evidence has closed the nascent hydrogen debate, presently considered to be a Gedanken artifact of romanticism.

== See also ==
- Kjeldahl method
- Nitrate test
- Nitrite test
- Nascent hydrogen
- Marsh test
- Detection of:
  - Arsine
  - Stibine
- Raney nickel, prepared from an Al, Ni alloy also dissolved in concentrated NaOH
- Zinc-copper couple
