= Lithium antimonide =

Names
- Other names: Trilithium antimonide; Trilithium stibide

Identifiers
CAS Number	12057-30-6
3D model (JSmol)	Interactive image
ChemSpider	64879603
ECHA InfoCard	100.031.825
EC Number	235-021-6
PubChem CID	20835941
CompTox Dashboard (EPA)	DTXCID301023969
- InChI: InChI=1S/3Li.Sb/q3*+1;-3 Key: BYEQKPAIGJHGMH-UHFFFAOYSA-N
- SMILES: [Li+].[Li+].[Li+].[Sb-3]

Properties
Chemical formula	Li_{3}Sb
Molar mass	142.58 g·mol^{−1}
Appearance	grey crystals
Density	3.2 g/cm^{3}
Solubility in water	reacts with water

Related compounds
Related compounds	Sodium antimonide; Potassium antimonide
- Except where otherwise noted, data are given for materials in their standard state (at 25 °C [77 °F], 100 kPa). Infobox references

Lithium antimonide is a binary inorganic compound of lithium and antimony with the molecular formula Li_{3}Sb.

== Synthesis ==
The compound is synthesized by fusing pure elements at 500 °С and high pressure:

3Li + Sb → Li_{3}Sb

When a mixture of lithium and antimony is heated, the elements react violently, releasing intense heat and flame. Other reactions are also known.

== Physical properties ==
The compound forms dark grey crystals of the cubic crystal system, space group Pm3m. At a temperature of 650 °C, a transition to the hexagonal phase occurs, spatial group P6_{3}/mmc.

== Chemical properties ==
Lithium antimonide reacts with water, producing stibine and lithium hydroxide:

Li_{3}Sb + 3H_{2}O → H_{3}Sb + 3LiOH

== Uses ==
The compound is recognized as a material for lithium batteries and thermoelectric applications.
