= Sodium antimonide =

Names
- Other names: trisodium antimony; trisodium antimonide; trisodium monoantimonide

Identifiers
CAS Number	12058-86-5
3D model (JSmol)	Interactive image
ChemSpider	32816441
ECHA InfoCard	100.031.835
EC Number	235-032-6
CompTox Dashboard (EPA)	DTXCID601023970
- InChI: InChI=1S/3Na.Sb/q3*+1;-3 Key: HSCHZFSFOSYHOF-UHFFFAOYSA-N
- SMILES: [Na+].[Na+].[Na+].[Sb-3]

Properties
Chemical formula	Na_{3}Sb
Molar mass	190.729 g·mol^{−1}
Appearance	bluish-black crystals
Density	2.6 g/cm^{3}
Melting point	856 °C (1,573 °F; 1,129 K)
Solubility in water	reacts with water

Related compounds
Related compounds	Potassium antimonide; Lithium antimonide
- Except where otherwise noted, data are given for materials in their standard state (at 25 °C [77 °F], 100 kPa). Infobox references

Sodium antimonide is a binary inorganic compound with the molecular formula Na_{3}Sb.

== Synthesis ==
The compound is often synthesized by fusing the elements together at 900 °C in an inert atmosphere (e.g. argon), resulting in a crystalline phase that facilitates Li or Na-ion storage.

3Na + Sb → Na_{3}Sb

== Physical properties ==
The compound forms bluish-black cystals of the hexagonal crystal system, space group P6_{3}/mmc, cell parameters a = 0.532 nm, c = 0.947 nm, Z = 2.

At high pressures (3 GPa), the transition to the cubic system occurs.

== Chemical properties ==
Sodium antimonide reacts with water, producing stibine and sodium hydroxide:

Na_{3}Sb + 3H_{2}O → H_{3}Sb + 3NaOH

== Uses ==
The compound is known for its application as a high-capacity, rechargeable anode material in sodium-ion batteries.

It is also used as a light-emitting component in photocathodes.
