= Marie Lafarge =

French murderer

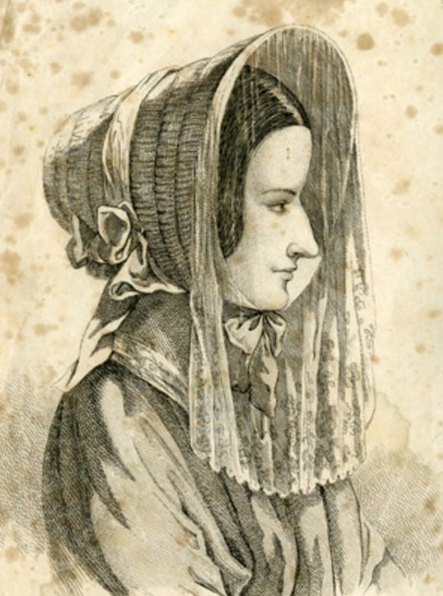
Marie Lafarge

Marie-Fortunée Lafarge (née Capelle; 15 January 1816 – 7 November 1852) was a French woman who was convicted of murdering her husband by arsenic poisoning in 1840. Her case became notable because it was one of the early trials to be followed by the public through daily newspaper reports, and because she was the first person convicted largely on direct forensic toxicological evidence. Nonetheless, questions about Lafarge's guilt divided French society to the extent that it is often compared to the better-known Dreyfus affair.

== Early life ==
Marie Lafarge was born in Paris in 1816, the daughter of an artillery officer. She is said to descend through her grandmother, Hermine, Baroness Collard, from a liaison between Stéphanie Félicité, comtesse de Genlis and Louis Philippe II, Duke of Orléans. Marie lost her father to a hunting accident when she was age 12; her mother, who remarried soon after, died seven years later.

At age 18, Marie was adopted by her maternal aunt, who was married to the secretary-general of the Bank of France. The two women did not get along. Despite that her foster parents treated her well and sent her to the best schools, Marie was kept aware of her status as a poor relative. Because she attended an elite school, Marie interacted with daughters of the moneyed aristocracy. She used every means to persuade them that she too came from a wealthy family and became envious when she saw her friends marrying rich noblemen. Marie had little say in the matter of matrimony. Her marriage dowry of 90,000 francs, while considerable, was not impressive considering her family's status, and Marie was left with feelings of inadequacy that fueled her pride and ambition.

As Marie remained unmarried when she turned 23, one of her uncles took responsibility for finding her a husband. Unknown to Marie, he engaged the services of a marriage broker. This transaction produced just one candidate who fit the advice of her father that "no marriage contract should be made with a man whose only income is his salary as a subprefect."

== Charles Lafarge ==
Charles Pouch-Lafarge was a big, coarse man, aged 28. He was the son of Jean-Baptiste Lafarge, justice of the peace in Vigeois. In 1817, Charles's father bought the former charterhouse, or Carthusian monastery, in the hamlet of Le Glandier, Corrèze, which had been run by Carthusian monks since the 13th century but fallen into disrepair after its suppression in the French Revolution. In an effort to make it profitable, Charles turned part of the estate into a foundry, a venture that plunged him into debt and bankruptcy.

In 1839, Charles saw a good marriage as the only way to pay his creditors. He engaged the same marriage broker who was hired to find a husband for Marie, advertising himself as a wealthy iron master with property worth more than 200,000 francs with an annual income of 30,000 from the foundry alone. He also carried letters of recommendation from his priest and local deputy. To hide that a marriage broker was involved in facilitating their relationship, Marie's uncle passed Charles as a friend and arranged a fortuitous meeting with Marie at the opera. Marie found Charles common and repulsive, but because he advertised himself as the owner of a palatial estate she agreed to marry him. Thus, four days after the meeting, her aunt announced their engagement, and they were married on 10 August 1839. The couple then left Paris for Le Glandier to live at the estate.

== Disillusionment ==
As it could be expected, when they arrived on 13 August, Marie was disillusioned. The house, contained within the ruins of the former monastery, was damp and rat-infested. Her in-laws were peasants who disgusted her and regarded her with deep distrust. Instead of the wealth she expected, she was faced with considerable debt. In her despondency, Marie locked herself in her room the first night and wrote a letter to her husband, imploring him to release her from their marriage, while threatening to take her life with arsenic. Charles, whose affairs were desperate, agreed to make concessions except to release her from the marriage. He promised not to assert his marital privileges until he restored the estate to its original condition. She appeared to become calm, and their relationship appeared to have improved in the ensuing weeks.

Despite her situation, Marie wrote letters to her school friends pretending that she was having a happy domestic life. She also tried to help her husband by writing letters of recommendation for Charles to Paris, where he hoped to raise money. In December 1839, before he left on a business trip, Marie made a will bequeathing to her husband her entire inheritance with the proviso that he would do the same for her. He did, but made another will without Marie's knowledge, leaving the Le Glandier property to his mother.

== Parisian illness ==
While Charles was in Paris, Marie wrote to him passionate love letters and sent him her picture, as well as a Christmas cake in the spirit of the season. He ate a piece of it and suddenly became violently ill soon after. As cholera-like symptoms were common in those days, he did not think about consulting with a physician but threw the cake away, thinking that it became spoiled in transit. When he returned to Le Glandier, having raised some money, he still felt ill. Marie put him to bed and fed him venison and truffles. Almost immediately, Charles again was afflicted with la maladie parisienne. The family physician, Dr. Bardon, agreed with its cholera-like symptoms and was not suspicious when Marie asked him for a prescription for arsenic in order to kill the rats that disturbed her husband during the evening.

The next day, Charles experienced leg cramps, dehydration and nausea. He was so ill that his relatives kept watch on him at all times, including a young cousin named Emma Pontier and a young woman who stayed with them by the name of Anna Brun. Marie treated him with various medicaments, especially gum arabic, which, according to her, always did her good, and which she always kept a ready supply of in her small malachite box, but to no avail. Charles deteriorated so rapidly that another physician, Dr. Massénat, was called in for consultation. He also diagnosed cholera and prescribed eggnog to strengthen him.

Anna noticed Marie taking white powder from her malachite box and stirring it into the eggnog. When asked, Marie said it was "orange-blossom sugar". Anna's suspicions were increased when she noticed a few white flakes floating on the surface of the eggnog after the patient took a few sips. She showed the glass to Dr. Massénat; he tasted the eggnog and experienced a burning sensation, but attributed the flakes to some ceiling plaster that may have fallen in the glass. Anna was not convinced; she put the rest of the eggnog in a cupboard and kept a close eye on Marie. She witnessed Marie stir more white powder into some soup for Charles. Again, Charles felt violently ill after a few sips. Anna took the cup of soup away and mustered courage to tell Charles's relatives of her suspicions.

== Suspicions of murder ==
On 12 January 1840, while the family gathered in the sickroom fearing the worst, Emma Pontier, who had such high regard for Marie, told her of Anna's suspicions. Charles's mother implored him not to take another morsel of food from his wife. Panic ensued when it was learned that Charles's servant and gardener had bought arsenic for Marie "for the rats". Marie admitted this request, but she made the gardener confirm that she gave him the arsenic to make rat-poison paste out of it. Their fears were momentarily allayed, but the next day, white residue was found at the bottom of a glass of sugar water that Marie had administered to Charles. A third doctor, René de Lespinasse, was called on 13 January. He suspected poison, but by then it was too late: Charles died a few hours later.

Already, suspicions ran high that Marie had poisoned her husband, but she seemed unfazed. While word went about regarding this suspicion, Marie went to her notary with the will, not knowing that it was invalid. Only Emma would go near her, and already torn by doubts, told Marie that Lafarge's brother-in-law was going to the police at Brive. Anna then took possession of Marie's malachite box.

The justice of the peace from Brive, Moran, arrived at Le Glandier on 15 January. Impressed by Marie, he listened with uncertainty to the family's accusations but took possession of the soup, the sugar water and the eggnog that Anna had put aside. Then the gardener revealed that Marie had given him arsenic with which to make rat-poison paste in December as well as January. Strangely, the paste could be found all over the house, untouched by the rats. Moran had the paste collected, his suspicions aroused. He questioned the apothecary who sold the arsenic to Marie and asked Charles's doctors to perform a post-mortem examination. He also learned of a new test for the presence of arsenic that pathologists in Paris were using and asked Lafarge's doctors if they could apply the same test in this case. Dr. Lespinasse hastily replied that they could, hiding their ignorance of the test and the intricacies of its procedure.

=== The Marsh test ===
The test that Moran was referring to was actually invented in 1836 by a Scottish chemist named James Marsh, who worked at the Royal Arsenal in Woolwich. Called to help solve a murder nearby, he tried to detect arsenic using the old methods. While he was successful, the sample had decomposed and did not convince the jury of the defendant's guilt. Frustrated at this turn of events, Marsh developed a glass apparatus that detected minute traces of arsenic and measured its quantity. The sample is mixed with arsenic-free zinc and sulphuric acid, any arsenic present causing the production of arsine gas and hydrogen. The gas then is led through a tube where it is heated, decomposing into hydrogen and arsenic vapor. When the arsenic vapor impinges on a cold surface, a mirror-like deposit of arsenic forms.

== Arrest and trial ==
Despite this discovery, word on the Marsh test had not reached Brive. The doctors doing the autopsy on Lafarge only took the stomach before burial, and they subjected this body part to the old methods, which, unknown to them, proved to be unreliable; but they finally asserted that arsenic was found in quantity in the body of Charles Lafarge.

More surprising was the analysis of the rat-poison paste; it turned out to be nothing more than a mixture of flour, water and soda. This led to the possibility that Marie used the real arsenic to murder her husband. Any remaining doubts that may have lingered vanished when Emma Pontier turned over the small malachite box, and Dr. Lespinasse found that it contained arsenic. Marie was arrested and held in jail in Brive. A young French lawyer, Charles Lachaud, was appointed to her defense and was assisted by three others, Maîtres Théodore Bac (who later became mayor of Limoges during the 1848 Revolution), Paillet, and Desmont. Before they began their work, there was another surprise. The newspaper stories regarding Marie Lafarge turned up something from her past.

=== Theft ===
Before she met Charles Lafarge, Marie had gone to the châteauone of the viscountess de Léautaud, one of her schoolmates. While there, her friend's jewels disappeared, and the sûreté was called to investigate the matter. When it was suspected that Marie was the culprit, the viscount thought that too improbable, and the matter was not pursued.

In the wake of the newspaper stories regarding the murder, the viscount was reminded of the theft and demanded a search for the jewels in Marie's room in Le Glandier. When the jewels turned up during the search, some newspapers believed her and put all the blame on the viscountess. Nonetheless, when she was put on trial for theft, the court was not so persuaded. Marie was found guilty and sentenced to two years' imprisonment in the nearby town of Tulle.

=== Trial ===
By this time, the Lafarge affair had generated so much interest that the curious arrived from all over Europe to watch her murder trial, elevating it to a cause célèbre. Thus, when Marie entered the assize court of Tulle for the first time on 3 September 1840, dressed in mourning and carrying a bottle of smelling salts in her hand, projecting the image of a woman unjustly accused, the spectators immediately were divided into pro- and anti-Marie factions.

Coincidentally, Maître Paillet, one of Marie's defense lawyers, was also the lawyer of the renowned toxicologist Mathieu Orfila, who was the acknowledged expert on the Marsh test in France. He realized that as the case hinged largely on the tests made by the Brive doctors, Paillet wrote to Orfila and showed him the test results. Orfila then submitted an affidavit stating that the tests were conducted so ignorantly that they meant nothing. As soon as the Brive doctors testified that arsenic was present in Lafarge's body, Paillet read the affidavit aloud, told the court about the Marsh test, and demanded that Orfila be called.

The prosecutor replied that he would consent to the test because he was confident of Marie's guilt, but he felt there was no need to call on Orfila to do it. The president of the court ruled in favor of the prosecutor's suggestion. Therefore, in lieu of Orfila, two well-known apothecaries from Tulle, M. Dubois and his son, and a chemist from Limoges named Dupuytren, were assigned to conduct the tests. While they were performed, the trial proceeded at a snail's pace. When they finally entered the courtroom, everyone waited to see what they would say. The elder Dubois testified that despite using the Marsh test carefully, they failed to find any arsenic. Almost immediately, the courtroom was in an uproar as Marie felt vindicated.

By then, the prosecutor had read Orfila's book and knew that in some cases, the arsenic left the stomach but had spread to other parts of the body. He arranged for the body of Lafarge to be exhumed. Again, the three chemists performed the test on the samples taken—and again, no arsenic was found.

The prosecutor had one card left to play. He had not forgotten the food items that Marie gave to Charles and were set aside. He requested that the test be performed on those as well. The defence, by then in a magnanimous mood, agreed.

This time, when the chemists arrived, they declared that they tested positive for arsenic, with the eggnog containing enough "to poison ten persons". The prosecutor took this fact as a chance to recoup his earlier setbacks. He declared that in view of the contradictory results, it was apparent that the court should call upon Orfila to settle the issue once and for all. Because it was the defence who originally asked for Orfila, they could not object to this request. The defence agreed, confident of Marie's acquittal.

=== Mathieu Orfila ===
When Orfila arrived, he insisted that the local chemists witness his experiments that night. He used the same test materials and chemical reagents that they used in the earliest tests and performed the Marsh test in an anteroom of the courthouse, behind locked and guarded doors. At last, on the afternoon of the next day, Orfila entered the courtroom, followed by the three chemists with bowed heads. He declared that he had found arsenic on the samples taken from the body of Lafarge, excluding all other extraneous sources, such as arsenic naturally occurring in the body, from the reagents, or from arsenic from the earth surrounding the coffin.

The courtroom was stunned, especially Maître Paillet, as he listened to Orfila, his client and defense witness, explain the misleading results obtained by the local experts with the Marsh test. It was not the test that gave the erroneous results, but rather, the test was performed incorrectly.

Knowing that Orfila's testimony had tipped the balance against them, the defense team sought to call a known opponent of Orfila, François Vincent Raspail, to refute his testimony. While Raspail had agreed, as he had done in previous courtroom clashes with Orfila, he arrived four hours too late. The jury had decided on Marie's case: guilty.

== Conviction and controversy ==
In the end, despite the passionate pleadings of Charles Lachaud, Marie, no longer as composed as she was previously throughout the trial, heard herself sentenced by the president of the court to life imprisonment with hard labor on 19 September and was brought to Montpellier to serve her sentence. King Louis-Philippe, however, commuted her sentence to life without hard labor.

By then, the affair had polarized French society. George Sand wrote to her friend Eugène Delacroix criticizing the perceived railroading of the case (it was worth noting that Marie, in turn, was an admirer of Sand and was said to read her works "greedily"). Raspail, as if to make up for his failure to make a difference in the trial, wrote and published incendiary leaflets against Orfila while demanding Marie's release. In effect, many have felt that Marie was a victim of injustice, convicted by scientific evidence of uncertain validity.

As if to defend himself from these criticisms, in the following months after the trial, Orfila conducted well-attended public lectures, often in the presence of members of the Academy of Medicine of Paris, to explain his views on the Marsh test. Soon, public awareness of the test was such that it was duplicated in salons and even in some plays recreating the Lafarge case.

== Aftermath ==
While imprisoned, Marie wrote her Mémoires, which were published in 1841.

At last, in June 1852, stricken with tuberculosis, she was released by Napoleon III. She settled in Ussat in Ariège and died on 7 November the same year, protesting her innocence. She was buried in the cemetery of Ornolac.

For Charles Lachaud, the Lafarge case was his baptism of fire. He later achieved greater fame defending François Achille Bazaine against charges of treason and was able to defend successfully another woman named Marie—last name Bière—in 1880. Jeanne Brécourt, whom he defended in 1877, was found guilty.

As for the monastery, it was bought again by the Carthusian monks in 1860 and flourished as before until it was sold again in 1904. It served as a shelter for children in World War I, then as a sanitarium for women and children run by the département of the Seine until 5 January 1965 when it became a shelter for semi-handicapped children. Finally, in January 2005, it was purchased by the département of Corrèze. The site of the former foundry (also that of the watermill powering it) now is privately owned.

== In popular culture ==
In 1937, the Lafarge case was fictionalized in the novel The Lady and the Arsenic by Joseph Shearing (a pseudonym of Marjorie Bowen).

The story of Marie Lafarge got the cinematic treatment in 1938 with the release of the film L'Affaire Lafarge, directed by Pierre Chenal, with Marcelle Chantal as Marie and Pierre Renoir as Charles. The film is notable for being the first French film to use flashbacks as a narrative device. The film had controversy as the grand-niece of Charles Lafarge sued the film's producers for defaming the memory of her great-uncle.

The radio series Crime Classics broadcast a version of the story of Marie Lafarge in its October 14, 1953 episode, titled "The Seven Layered Arsenic Cake of Madame Lafarge". Marie Lafarge was portrayed by Eve McVeagh, and William Conrad played the part of Charles Lafarge. The broadcast claimed that Marie Lafarge committed suicide after her release from prison.

Between 1989 and 1994, Czech Television produced in cooperation with some German TVs four seasons of the television series Dobrodružství kriminalistiky (Adventure of Criminalistics). The second episode of the first series, titled "Jed" ("Poison"), dealt with the case of Marie Lafarge. The whole story is narrated, including the turbulent course of the trial. Marie Lafarge was portrayed by German actress Anke Sevenich, Tomáš Töpfer played a smaller part of Charles Lafarge, while Viktor Preiss as the Lafarge's lawyer and Ladislav Frej as the prosecutor stand in the center of the story.

== Bibliography ==
- Adler, L. (1986). L'Amour à l'arsenic: histoire de Marie Lafarge. Paris: Denoël.
- Apostolidès, Jean-Marie (2012). Trois solitudes: D.A.F. de Sade, Marie Lafarge, Josefa Menéndez (in French). Paris: L'Harmattan. ISBN 978-2-296-49919-5.
- Bertomeu-Sánchez, J. R. (2006). "Sense and sensitivity: Mateu Orfila, the Marsh test and the Lafarge affair". In Bertomeu-Sánchez; Nieto-Galan (eds.). M. Orfila and his times. Science History Publications.
- Bertomeu-Sánchez, J. R. (2015). La verdad sobre el caso Lafarge. Ciencia, justicia y ley durante el siglo XIX. Barcelona: El Serbal.
- Dumas, A. (2005). Madame Lafarge. Paris: Pygmalion.
- Lafarge, M. (1867). Mémoires de madame Lafarge, née Marie Cappelle, écrits par elle-même. Paris: Lévy frères.
- Sobieniak, C. (2010). Rebondissements dans l'affaire Lafarge. Saint-Paul: Lucien Souny.
