= L'Affaire Lafarge =

L'Affaire Lafarge may refer to:

- The 1840 trial and conviction of Marie Lafarge for murdering her husband by arsenic poisoning
- The Lafarge Case (L'Affaire Lafarge), a 1938 French film based on the 1840 case
- Allegations against French cement company Lafarge involving complicity in crimes against humanity
