= Nascent hydrogen =

Disputed concept in chemistry

Nascent hydrogen is an outdated concept in organic chemistry that was once invoked to explain dissolving-metal reactions, such as the Clemmensen reduction and the Bouveault–Blanc reduction. Since organic compounds do not react with H_{2}, a special state of hydrogen was postulated. It is now understood that dissolving-metal reactions occur at the metal surface, and the concept of nascent hydrogen has been discredited in organic chemistry. However, the formation of atomic hydrogen is largely invoked in inorganic chemistry and corrosion sciences to explain hydrogen embrittlement in metals exposed to electrolysis and anaerobic corrosion (e.g., dissolution of zinc in strong acids (HCl) and aluminium in strong bases (NaOH)). The mechanism of hydrogen embrittlement was first proposed by Johnson (1875). The inability of hydrogen atoms to react with organic reagents in organic solvents does not exclude the transient formation of hydrogen atoms capable to immediately diffuse into the crystal lattice of common metals (steel, titanium) different from these of the platinoid group (Pt, Pd, Rh, Ru, Ni) which are well known to dissociate molecular dihydrogen (H_{2}) into atomic hydrogen.

== History ==
The idea of hydrogen in the nascent state having chemical properties different from those of molecular hydrogen developed the mid-19th century. Alexander Williamson repeatedly refers to nascent hydrogen in his textbook Chemistry for Students, for example writing of the substitution reaction of carbon tetrachloride with hydrogen to form products such as chloroform and dichloromethane that the "hydrogen must for this purpose be in the nascent state, as free hydrogen does not produce the effect". Williamson also describes the use of nascent hydrogen in the earlier work of Marcellin Berthelot. Franchot published a paper on the concept in 1896, which drew a strongly worded response from Tommasi who pointed to his own work that concluded "nascent hydrogen is nothing else than H + x calories".

The term "nascent hydrogen" continued to be invoked into the 20th century.

== Reducing agents at low and high pH ==
Devarda's alloy (alloy of aluminium (~45%), copper (~50%) and zinc (~5%)) is a reducing agent that was commonly used in wet analytical chemistry to produce in situ so-called nascent hydrogen under alkaline conditions for the determination of nitrates (NO^{−}_{3}) after their reduction into ammonia (NH_{3}).

In the Marsh test, used for arsenic determination (from the reduction of arsenate (AsO^{3−}_{4}) and arsenite (AsO^{3−}_{3}) into arsine (AsH_{3})), hydrogen is generated by contacting zinc powder with hydrochloric acid.

So, hydrogen can be conveniently produced at low or high pH, according to the volatility of the species to be detected. Acid conditions in the Marsh test promote the fast escape of the arsine gas (AsH_{3}), while under hyperalkaline solution, the degassing of the reduced ammonia (NH_{3}) is greatly facilitated (the ammonium ion NH^{+}_{4} being soluble in aqueous solution under acidic conditions).

== See also ==
- Atomic hydrogen welding
