= Bismuthine =

Chemical compound of bismuth and hydrogen

- Skeletal formula of bismuthine

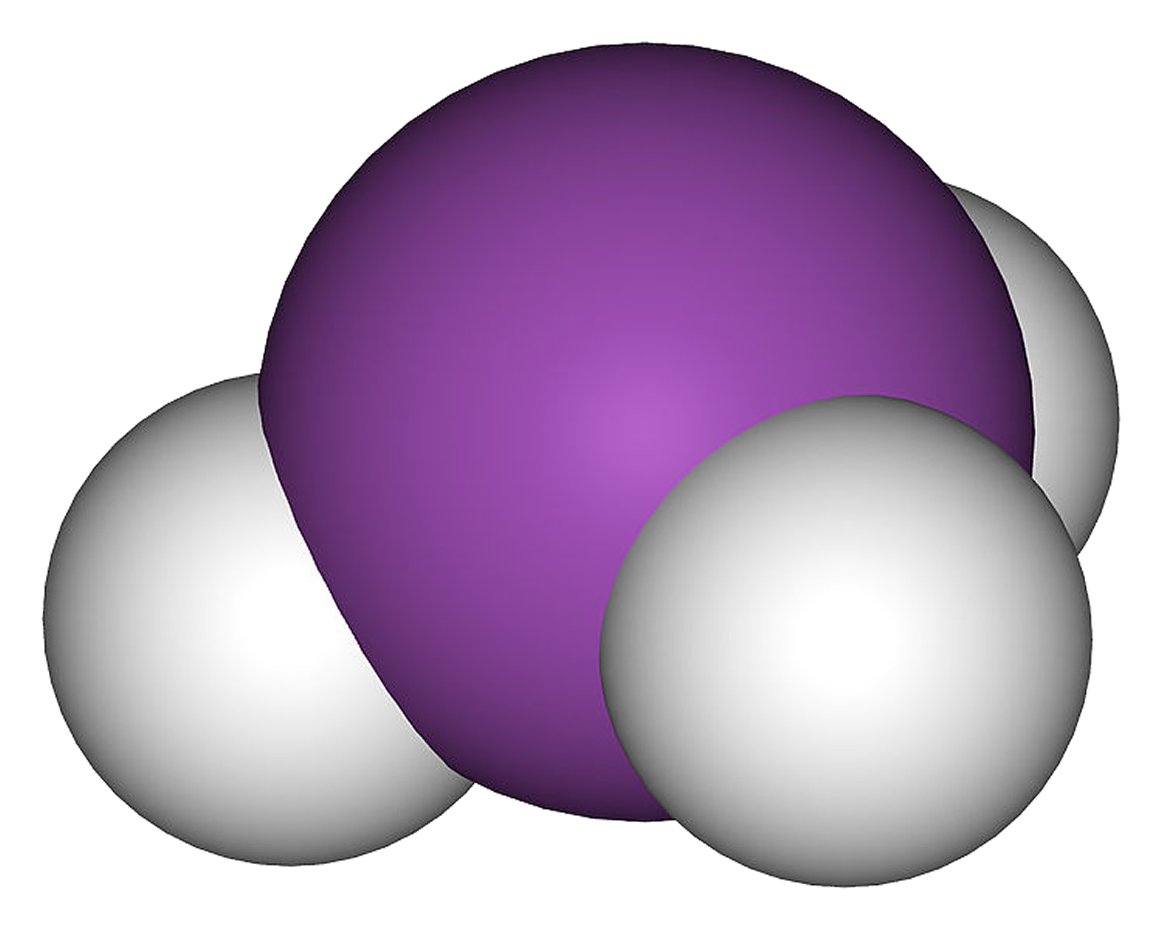
- Spacefill model of bismuthine Bismuth, Bi Hydrogen, H

Names
- IUPAC name bismuthane
- Other names bismuth trihydride hydrogen bismuthide bismine trihydridobismuth

Identifiers
CAS Number	18288-22-7
3D model (JSmol)	Interactive image
ChemSpider	8886
PubChem CID	9242
UNII	OCH2V0Z37N
CompTox Dashboard (EPA)	DTXSID3052484 DTXSID50171355, DTXSID3052484
- InChI: InChI=1S/Bi.3H Key: BPBOBPIKWGUSQG-UHFFFAOYSA-N; InChI=1/Bi.3H/rBiH3/h1H3 Key: BPBOBPIKWGUSQG-PVKOQVOWAF
- SMILES: [BiH3]

Properties
Chemical formula	BiH_{3}
Molar mass	212.00 g/mol
Appearance	colourless gas
Density	0.008665 g/mL (20 °C)
Boiling point	16.8 °C (62.2 °F; 289.9 K) (extrapolated)
Conjugate acid	Bismuthonium

Structure
Molecular shape	trigonal pyramidal

Related compounds
Related hydrides	Ammonia; Phosphine; Arsine; Stibine
Related compounds	Polonium hydride
- Except where otherwise noted, data are given for materials in their standard state (at 25 °C [77 °F], 100 kPa). verify (what is ?) Infobox references

Bismuthine (IUPAC name: bismuthane) is the chemical compound with the formula BiH_{3}. As the heaviest analogue of ammonia (a pnictogen hydride), BiH_{3} is unstable, decomposing to bismuth metal well below 0 °C. This compound adopts the expected pyramidal structure with H–Bi–H angles of around 90°.

The term bismuthine may also refer to a member of the family of organobismuth(III) species having the general formula BiR_{3}, where R is an organic substituent. For example, Bi(CH_{3})_{3} is trimethylbismuthine.

== Preparation and properties ==
BiH_{3} is prepared by the redistribution of methylbismuthine (BiH_{2}Me):

3 BiH_{2}Me → 2 BiH_{3} + BiMe_{3}

The required BiH_{2}Me, which is also thermally unstable, is generated by reduction of methylbismuth dichloride, BiCl_{2}Me with LiAlH_{4}.

As suggested by the behavior of SbH_{3}, BiH_{3} is unstable and decomposes to its constituent elements according to the following equation:

2 BiH_{3} → 3 H_{2} + 2 Bi (ΔH^{~~o~~}_{f}(gas) = −278 kJ/mol)

The methodology used for detection of arsenic ("Marsh test") can also be used to detect BiH_{3}. This test relies on the thermal decomposition of these trihydrides to the metallic mirrors of reduced As, Sb, and Bi. These deposits can be further distinguished by their distinctive solubility characteristics: arsenic dissolves in NaOCl, antimony dissolves in ammonium polysulfide, and bismuth resists both reagents.

== Uses and safety considerations ==
The low stability of BiH_{3} precludes significant health effects, it decomposes rapidly well below room temperature.
