= Nascent state (chemistry) =

Obsolete chemical theory

Nascent state or in statu nascendi (Lat. newly formed moiety: in the state of being born or just emerging), is an obsolete theory in chemistry. It refers to the form of a chemical element (or sometimes compound) in the instance of their liberation or formation. Often encountered are atomic oxygen (O_{nasc}), nascent hydrogen (H_{nasc}), and similar forms of chlorine (Cl_{nasc}) or bromine (Br_{nasc}).

The concept of a "nascent state" was developed to explain the observation that gases generated in situ are frequently more reactive than identical chemicals that have been stored for an extended period of time. First usage of the term was in work by Joseph Priestley around 1790. Auguste Laurent expanded on the theory in the mid 19th century.

Constantine Zenghelis hypothesized in 1920 that the increased reactivity of the "nascent" state was due to the fine dispersion of the molecules, not their status as free atoms. Still popular in the early 20th century, the nascent state theory was recognized as declining by 1942.

A 1990 review noted that the term was still found as a passing mention in contemporary textbooks. The review summarized that the increased activity observed is actually caused by multiple kinetic effects, and that grouping all these effects into a single term could cause chemists to view the effect too simplistically.

== See also ==
- Atomic oxygen
- Radical (chemistry)
- Singlet oxygen
