= Sanger–Black apparatus =

Piece of chemical laboratory ware

Sanger–Black apparatus

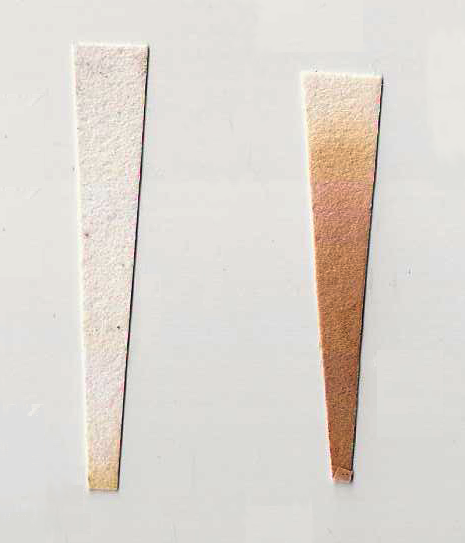
Reagent papers after the test has been run. The paper on the left is from a test where there was no arsenic in the sample (little yellow stains at the lower end of paper is from trace imputities of As usually found in Zn); the paper on the right is stained characteristically to considerable amounts of As in the sample.

Sanger–Black apparatus is a piece of chemical laboratory ware used for quantitative and semi-quantitative determination of arsenic element in the solution. It is constituted by glass bottle of volume ca. 30 mL, sealed with rubber stopper with one or two holes. Through one hole a thistle tube is inserted, almost reaching the bottom, for filling the bottle (what can be done also when the stopper is taken out – for semi-quantitative determination). The second, S-shaped tube is for outflow of the gases and joined by another rubber stopper to a bulg tube, with bulb containing pre-dried cotton as adsorbent, presumably intended for homogenizing the gas flow. A thin reagent paper, impregnated with mercury(II) chloride (nowadays replaced by mercury(II) bromide) or silver(I) nitrate, is placed in the open end of the bulb tube. If the semi-quantitative variant is to be performed, the paper is put in the (only) thistle tube – i. e., vertically, not horizontally. During the test ca. 3 g of Zn granules are placed into the bottle, just below the end of thistle tube, and then acid solution is added (ca. 15 mL; authors recommend that HCl is preferable to H_{2}SO_{4}). About 10 minutes are required to let H_{2} flow along the reagent paper, while this flow and moisture content inside it is stabilizing. Then the sample is introduced, and in case of sample solution containing arsenic the paper becomes more or less stained.

The Sanger–Black determination is based on the so-called Gutzeit test that employs the Gutzeit reaction (1879):

$3 \mbox{HgCl}_{2} + \mbox{AsH}_{3} ~ \rightarrow ~ \mbox{AsHg}_{3} \mbox{Cl}_{3} + 3 \mbox{HCl}$

AsH_{3} is forming from arsenic in any oxidation state when it reduces with the hydrogen in statu nascendi, produced from the acid. Gutzeit originally used AgNO_{3} for determination. The innovation to the Gutzeit method by Sanger and Black is the use of long and narrow paper, so that gas flow is directed along it and the product of reaction used as analytic signal deposits almost uniquely in the surface layers of the paper, so that stain area is quantitative analytic signal (if all the prerequisites for determination are fulfilled). Unfortunately, yellow colour is not that human eye is especially sensitive for, so photometric tools were introduced for quantitative analysis quite a long time ago (in 1944).

Zinc naturally contains some trace amounts of arsenic, so a modest yellow stain appears almost in any case on the reagent paper. This limits the sensitivity of this test, as arsenic amounts in zinc vary from one supplier to another. That is why later Zn was replaced by sodium borohydride NaBH_{4}; then, strong and corrosive hydrochloric acid was also replaced with sulfamic acid NH_{2}SO_{3}H.
