= Arsine (data page) =

Chemical data page

This page provides supplementary chemical data on arsine.

== Material Safety Data Sheet ==
- SIRI
- Soxal

== Structure and properties ==
Structure and properties
Relative density, gas	2,7 (air = 1)
Relative density, liquid	1,6 (water = 1)
