= Marsh test =

Method for detecting arsenic

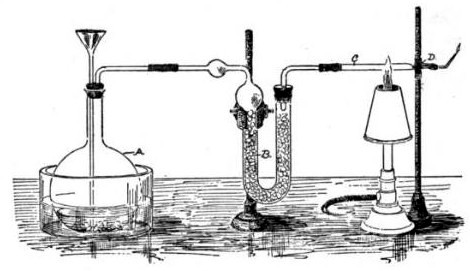
Apparatus for the Marsh test

The Marsh test is a highly sensitive method in the detection of arsenic, especially useful in the field of forensic toxicology when arsenic was used as a poison. It was developed by the chemist James Marsh and first published in 1836. The method continued to be used, with improvements, in forensic toxicology until the 1970s.

Arsenic, in the form of white arsenic trioxide As_{2}O_{3}, was a highly favored poison, being odourless, easily incorporated into food and drink, and before the advent of the Marsh test, untraceable in the body. In France, it came to be known as poudre de succession ("inheritance powder"). For the untrained, arsenic poisoning will have symptoms similar to cholera.

== Precursor methods ==
The first breakthrough in the detection of arsenic poisoning was in 1775 when Carl Wilhelm Scheele discovered a way to change arsenic trioxide to garlic-smelling arsine gas (AsH_{3}), by treating it with nitric acid (HNO_{3}) and combining it with zinc:

As_{2}O_{3} + 6 Zn + 12 HNO_{3} → 2 AsH_{3} + 6 Zn(NO_{3})_{2} + 3 H_{2}O

In 1787, German physician Johann Metzger (1739-1805) discovered that if arsenic trioxide were heated in the presence of carbon, the arsenic would sublime. This is the reduction of As_{2}O_{3} by carbon:

2 As_{2}O_{3} + 3 C → 3 CO_{2} + 4 As

In 1806, Valentin Rose took the stomach of a victim suspected of being poisoned and treated it with potassium carbonate (K_{2}CO_{3}), calcium oxide (CaO) and nitric acid. Any arsenic present would appear as arsenic trioxide and then could be subjected to Metzger's test.

The most common test (and used even today in water test kits) was discovered by Samuel Hahnemann. It would involve combining a sample fluid with hydrogen sulfide (H_{2}S) in the presence of hydrochloric acid (HCl). A yellow precipitate, arsenic trisulfide (As_{2}S_{3}) would be formed if arsenic was present.

== Circumstances and methodology ==
Though precursor tests existed, they had sometimes proven not to be sensitive enough. In 1832, a certain John Bodle was brought to trial for poisoning his grandfather by putting arsenic in his coffee. James Marsh, a chemist working at the Royal Arsenal in Woolwich, was called by the prosecution to try to detect its presence. He performed the standard test by passing hydrogen sulfide through the suspect fluid. While Marsh was able to detect arsenic, the yellow precipitate did not keep very well, and, by the time it was presented to the jury, it had deteriorated. The jury was not convinced, and John Bodle was acquitted.

Angered and frustrated by this, especially when John Bodle confessed later that he indeed killed his grandfather, Marsh decided to devise a better test to demonstrate the presence of arsenic. Taking Scheele's work as a basis, he constructed a simple glass apparatus capable of not only detecting minute traces of arsenic but also measuring its quantity. Adding a sample of tissue or body fluid to a glass vessel with zinc and acid would produce arsine gas if arsenic was present, in addition to the hydrogen that would be produced regardless by the zinc reacting with the acid. Igniting this gas mixture would oxidize any arsine present into arsenic and water vapor. This would cause a cold ceramic bowl held in the jet of the flame to be stained with a silvery-black deposit of arsenic, physically similar to the result of Metzger's reaction. The intensity of the stain could then be compared to films produced using known amounts of arsenic. Not only could minute amounts of arsenic be detected (as little as 0.02 mg), the test was very specific for arsenic. Although antimony (Sb) could give a false-positive test by forming stibine (SbH_{3}) gas, which decomposes on heating to form a similar black deposit, it would not dissolve in a solution of sodium hypochlorite (NaOCl), while arsenic would. Bismuth (Bi), which also gives a false positive by forming bismuthine (BiH_{3}), similarly can be distinguished by how it resists attack by both NaOCl and ammonium polysulfide (the former attacks As, and the latter attacks Sb).

== Specific reactions involved ==
The Marsh test treats the sample with sulfuric acid and arsenic-free zinc. Even if there are minute amounts of arsenic present, the zinc reduces the trivalent arsenic (As^{3+}). Here are the two half-reactions:

Oxidation: Zn → Zn^{2+} + 2 e^{−}
Reduction: As_{2}O_{3} + 12 e^{−} + 6 H^{+} → 2 As^{3−} + 3 H_{2}O

They combine into this reaction:

As_{2}O_{3} + 6 Zn + 6 H^{+} → 2 As^{3−} + 6 Zn^{2+} + 3 H_{2}O

In an acidic medium, As^{3−} is protonated to form arsine gas (AsH_{3}), so with adding sulphuric acid (H_{2}SO_{4}) to each side of the equation and by eliminating the common ions:

As_{2}O_{3} + 6 Zn + 6 H_{2}SO_{4} → 2 AsH_{3} + 6 ZnSO_{4} + 3 H_{2}O

== First notable application ==
Although the Marsh test was efficacious, its first publicly documented use—in fact, the first time evidence from forensic toxicology was ever introduced—was in Tulle, France in 1840 with the celebrated Lafarge poisoning case. Charles Lafarge, a foundry owner, was suspected of being poisoned with arsenic by his wife, Marie. The circumstantial evidence was great: it was shown that she bought arsenic trioxide from a local chemist, supposedly to kill rats that infested their home. In addition, their maid swore that she had mixed a white powder into his drink. Although the food was found to be positive for the poison using the old methods as well as the Marsh test, when the husband's body was exhumed and tested, the chemists assigned to the case were not able to detect arsenic. Mathieu Orfila, the renowned toxicologist and an acknowledged authority of the Marsh test, examined the results. He performed the test again, and demonstrated that the Marsh test was not at fault for the misleading results, but rather, those who performed it did so incorrectly. Orfila thus proved the presence of arsenic in Lafarge's body using the test. As a result, Marie Lafarge was found guilty and sentenced to life imprisonment.

== Effects ==
The Lafarge case proved to be controversial, for it divided the country into factions who were convinced or otherwise of Mme. Lafarge's guilt; nevertheless, the impact of the Marsh test was great. The French press covered the trial and gave the test the publicity it needed to give the field of forensic toxicology the legitimacy it deserved, although in some ways it trivialized it: actual Marsh test assays were conducted in salons, public lectures and even in some plays that recreated the Lafarge case.

The existence of the Marsh test also served a deterrent effect: deliberate arsenic poisonings became rarer because the fear of discovery became more prevalent.

== In fiction ==
Marsh test is used in Bill Bergson Lives Dangerously (1951) to prove that a certain chocolate is poisoned with arsenic.

Lord Peter Wimsey’s manservant Bunter uses Marsh’s test in Strong Poison to demonstrate that the culprit was secretly in possession of arsenic.

In Alan Bradley's As Chimney Sweepers Come To Dust, 12-year old sleuth and chemistry genius Flavia de Luce uses the Marsh test to determine that arsenic was the murderer's weapon.

In the first episode of the 2017 BBC television series Taboo a mirror test, referencing the Marsh test, is used to verify the protagonist's father was killed via arsenic poisoning. As the setting of the series is between 1814-1820, however, the test's appearance is anachronistic.

In the episode "The King Came Calling" of the first season of Ripper Street, police surgeon Homer Jackson (Matthew Rothenberg) performs Marsh's test on the contents of a poisoning victim and determines that the fatal poison was antimony, not arsenic, since the chemical residue deposited by the flames does not dissolve in sodium hypochlorite.

In episode of the 1957 television series Perry Mason, "The Case of the Fiery Fingers" (s01 ep31), a doctor testifying on the stand regarding the victim of a fatal poisoning is asked if he performed a Marsh test to determine that the poison used was arsenic. The doctor confirms that the Marsh test was used and allowed him to identify the poison as arsenic.

== See also ==
- Nascent hydrogen
- Devarda's alloy
