= Potassium antimonide =

Names
- Other names: Tripotassium antimonide; Tripotassium stibide

Identifiers
| CAS Number | 16823-94-2 |
| 3D model (JSmol) | Interactive image |
| ChemSpider | 64879259 |
| ECHA InfoCard | 100.037.117 |
| EC Number | 240-845-4 |
| CompTox Dashboard (EPA) | DTXSID30884936 |
- InChI: InChI=1S/3K.Sb/q3*+1;-3 Key: GYDKERHHPLJHBX-UHFFFAOYSA-N
- SMILES: [K+].[K+].[K+].[Sb-3]

Properties
| Chemical formula | K_{3}Sb |
| Molar mass | 239.055 g·mol^{−1} |
| Appearance | yellow-green crystals |
| Density | 2.37 g/cm^{3} |
| Melting point | 812 °C (1,494 °F; 1,085 K) |
| Solubility in water | reacts with water |

Related compounds
| Related compounds | Sodium antimonide |
- Except where otherwise noted, data are given for materials in their standard state (at 25 °C [77 °F], 100 kPa). Infobox references

Potassium antimonide is a binary inorganic compound of potassium and antimony with the molecular formula K_{3}Sb.

== Synthesis ==
The compound is synthesized by fusing the elements:

3K + Sb → K_{3}Sb

== Physical properties ==
The compound forms yellow-green crystals of the hexagonal crystal system, space group P6_{3}/mmc.

A cubic form of K_{3}Sb can be obtained as a thin film by first oxidizing the surface of an antimony layer before introducing potassium.

== Chemical properties ==
Potassium antimonide reacts with water, producing stibine and potassium hydroxide:

K_{3}Sb + 3H_{2}O → H_{3}Sb + 3KOH

== Uses ==
The compound is recognized for its applications in electronics, particularly within photocathodes and photomultiplier tubes. Its capacity to release electrons upon light exposure renders it essential in equipment that depends on effective photoemission.
