= Arsonium =

Ion

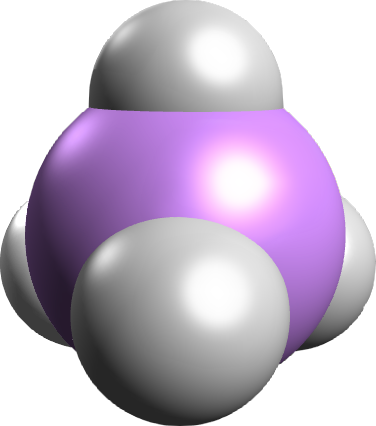

Names
- Systematic IUPAC name Arsonium

Identifiers
CAS Number	53250-40-1
3D model (JSmol)	Interactive image
ChEBI	CHEBI:30272
ChemSpider	4574016
Gmelin Reference	322800
PubChem CID	5460506
CompTox Dashboard (EPA)	DTXSID10420093
- InChI: InChI=1S/AsH4/h1H4/q+1 Key: VUEDNLCYHKSELL-UHFFFAOYSA-N
- SMILES: [AsH4+]

Properties
Chemical formula	AsH^{+}_{4}
Molar mass	78.954 g·mol^{−1}
Conjugate base	Arsine

Structure
Molecular shape	Tetrahedral

Related compounds
Related compounds	ammonium phosphonium
- Except where otherwise noted, data are given for materials in their standard state (at 25 °C [77 °F], 100 kPa). Infobox references

Structure of quaternary arsonium compound arsenobetaine.

The arsonium cation is a positively charged polyatomic ion with the chemical formula AsH^{+}_{4}. An arsonium salt is a salt containing either the arsonium (AsH^{+}_{4}) cation, such as arsonium bromide (AsH^{+}_{4}Br^{−}) and arsonium iodide (AsH^{+}_{4}I^{−}), which can be synthesized by reacting arsine with hydrogen bromide or hydrogen iodide. Or more commonly, as organic derivative such as the quaternary arsonium salts Ph_{4}As^{+}Cl^{−} (CAS: 123334-18-9 , hydrate form) and the zwitterionic compound arsenobetaine.
