= Jeanne Brécourt =

Notorious French courtesan and criminal

- Born: Eugénie Arménaïde Brécourt; 8 April 1837; Paris, France
- Other names: Jeanne Bricourt; Jeanne Gras; Jeanne de la Cour; Widow Gras
- Occupation: Courtesan
- Known for: Having her lover blinded

Jeanne Brécourt, sometimes written Bricourt, (born 8 April 1837), was one of France's most notorious courtesans. Using dishonesty and blackmail, she ruined some of her lovers. She was sentenced 15 years' penal servitude for having one of her lovers blinded.

== Biography ==
Born Eugénie Arménaïde Brécourt on 8 April 1837 in Paris, she was the daughter of a printer and a vegetable seller. As a child, she was neglected, and at age 5, she was adopted by a baroness. When Brécourt was age 11, her parents took her from the baroness and used her to sell gingerbread on the streets. When she was age 17, she returned to the baroness, who agreed to take her into the home and found her work in a silk factory.

When Brécourt was age 18, she attended the wedding of a co-worker. On returning home, she expressed her desire to get married. The baroness didn't take her seriously and when Gras, the grocer, called to make his delivery, jokingly suggested him for a husband. Brécourt took the idea seriously, and in 1855, the couple married. The Baroness reluctantly gave her consent and provided a dowry of 12,000 francs, which the couple used to open a grocery store. The marriage didn't last long. Brécourt was very demanding, and after a while, Gras left. Brécourt went back to the baroness for a while and then disappeared. She is reputed to have started a relationship with an officer of the garrison at Vincennes.

== Courtesan ==
Some while later, Brécourt reappeared as a courtesan, calling herself Jeanne de la Cour, having unsuccessfully attempted commerce, acting, literature and journalism. Brécourt regarded men as playthings, discarded when they had served their purpose. She wrote:

All is dust and lies. So much the worse for the men who get in my way. Men are mere stepping-stones to me. As soon as they begin to fail or are played out, I put them scornfully aside. Society is a vast chess-board, men the pawns, some white, some black; I move them as I please, and break them when they bore me.

One of her lovers, a German, committed suicide, another took an overdose of cantharides, and a third died in hospital. Brécourt was unmoved by their deaths, but her actions ended with her being admitted to an asylum. A few months later, she was released as "cured". From the asylum, she went to Vittel, where she assumed the title of baroness.

When Brécourt was in her late 30s, her hair was greying and her looks fading. Her lovers were deserting her because of her blackmailing them, others looking for younger women. Gras died in a charity hospital, and Brécourt, now free from her past and wishing to safeguard her future, sought a permanent benefactor.

== Rene de la Roche ==
In 1873, Brécourt met Rene de la Roche at a ball in Paris. Roche was a wealthy, young man, age 20, who became infatuated with her, and by the end of that year, they had entered into a relationship. Roche was referred to in some reports as Georges de Saint Pierre to protect his anonymity. Three years later, Roche left for six months in Egypt.

Brécourt met an aging courtesan with a younger blind lover who was devoted to her and could not see the effects of age on her. The concept appealed to Brécourt, and upon Roche's returned from Egypt in 1876, she hatched a plot to blind him. Nathalis Gaudry had been a childhood friend of Brécourt, and they were reunited when he moved to Paris looking for employment after being in the army. She convinced Gaudry to blind Roche, telling him that Roche was the son of a man who had cheated her. Gaudry eventually fulfilled her wish and blinded Roche on 13 January 1877.

Brécourt and Gaudry were brought to trial for this in July 1877, with Brécourt defended by Charles Lachaud, who had earlier defended Marie Lafarge. Brécourt was found guilty and sentenced to 15 years of penal servitude, while Gaudry was found guilty with extenuating circumstances and sentenced to five years in prison.

== Bibliography ==
- Commire, Anne, ed. (2002). Women in World History: A biographical encyclopedia.
- Irving, H. B. (7 November 2015). A Book of Remarkable Criminals: Top Crime Story (PDF). 谷月社.
- Nash, Jay Robert (1 November 1986). Look for the Woman: A Narrative Encyclopedia of Female Prisoners, Kidnappers, Thieves, Extortionists, Terrorists, Swindlers and Spies from Elizabethan Times to the Present. M. Evans. ISBN 978-1-4617-4772-7.
