= Nitrate test =

Chemical test

A nitrate test is a chemical test used to determine the presence of nitrate ion in a solution. Testing for the presence of nitrate via wet chemistry is generally difficult compared with testing for other anions because most nitrates are soluble in water. In contrast, many common ions give insoluble salts, e.g. halides precipitate with silver, and sulfate precipitate with barium.

The nitrate anion is an oxidizer, and many tests for the nitrate anion are based on this property. However, other oxidants present in the analyte may interfere and give erroneous results.

Nitrate can also be detected by first reducing it to the more reactive nitrite ion and using one of many nitrite tests.

== Brown ring test ==
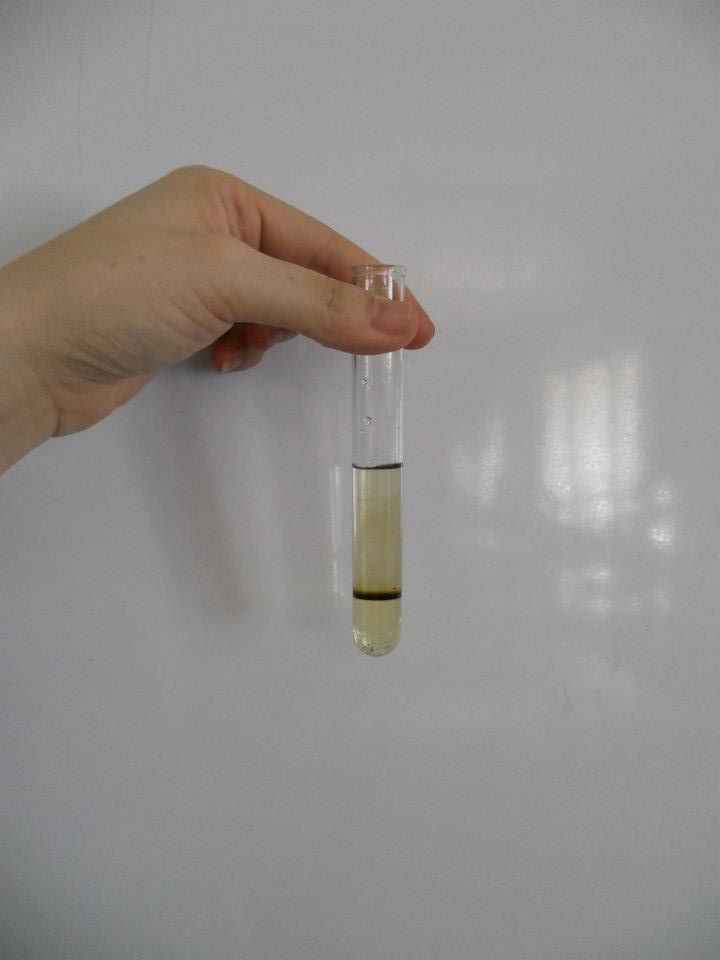
Nitrate Test by using Brown Ring Test

A common nitrate test, known as the brown ring test can be performed by adding iron(II) sulfate to a solution of a nitrate, then slowly adding concentrated sulfuric acid such that the acid forms a layer below the aqueous solution. A brown ring will form at the junction of the two layers, indicating the presence of the nitrate ion. Note that the presence of nitrite ions will interfere with this test.

The overall reaction is the reduction of the nitrate ion to nitric oxide by iron(II), which is oxidised to iron(III), followed by the formation of nitrosyl ferrous sulfate between the nitric oxide and the remaining iron(II), where nitric oxide is reduced to NO^{−}.

2HNO_{3} + 3H_{2}SO_{4} + 6FeSO_{4} → 3Fe_{2}(SO_{4})_{3} + 2NO + 4H_{2}O
[Fe(H_{2}O)_{6}]SO_{4} + NO → [Fe(H_{2}O)_{5}(NO)]SO_{4} + H_{2}O

This test is sensitive up to 2.5 micrograms and a concentration of 1 in 25,000 parts.

Oxidation State of Iron in Brown Ring Complex: The oxidation state of iron in brown ring complex is a debatable issue but Mondal et al. (2025) critically reviewed the electronic structure of the classical brown ring complex, emphasizing the strong π-bonding in the Fe–N–O linkage and the non-innocent nature of the NO ligand. Their analysis of Mössbauer isomer shift, EPR, IR, X-ray crystallographic data on reported complexes of high spin {Fe(NO)}^{7} (S = 3/2) supports that the iron center of Brown ring complex possesses an intermediate oxidation state between +2 and +3, though more consistent with a value closer to +3.

== Devarda's test ==
Devarda's alloy (Copper/Aluminium/Zinc) is a reducing agent. When reacted with nitrate in sodium hydroxide solution, ammonia is liberated. The ammonia formed may be detected by its characteristic odor, and by damp red litmus paper's turning blue, signalling that it is an alkali — very few gases other than ammonia evolved from wet chemistry are alkaline.

3 NO^{−}_{3} + 8 Al + 5 OH^{−} + 18 H_{2}O → 3 NH_{3} + 8 [Al(OH)_{4}]^{−}

Aluminium is the reducing agent in this reaction that will occur.

== Diphenylamine test ==
Diphenylamine may be used as a wet chemical test for the presence of the nitrate ion. In this test, a solution of diphenylamine and ammonium chloride in sulfuric acid is used. In the presence of nitrates, diphenylamine is oxidized, giving a blue coloration. This reaction has been used to test for organic nitrates as well, and has found use in gunshot residue kits detecting nitroglycerine and nitrocellulose.

== Copper turnings test ==
The nitrate ion can easily be identified by heating copper turnings along with concentrated sulfuric acid. Effervescence of a brown, pungent gas is observed which turns moist blue litmus paper red.

Here sulfuric acid reacts with the nitrate ion to form nitric acid. Nitric acid then reacts with the copper turnings to form nitric oxide. Nitric oxide is thus oxidised to nitrogen dioxide.

Cu + 4 HNO_{3} → Cu(NO_{3})_{2} + 2 NO_{2} +2H_{2}O

== See also ==
- Nitrite test
