= Nitrite test =

Chemical test for nitrite

A nitrite test is a chemical test used to determine the presence of nitrite ion in solution.

== Chemical methods ==
=== Using iron(II) sulfate ===
A simple nitrite test can be performed by adding 4 M sulfuric acid to the sample until acidic, and then adding 0.1 M iron(II) sulfate to the solution. A positive test for nitrite is indicated by a dark brown solution, arising from the iron-nitric oxide complex ion. This test is related to the brown ring test for the nitrate ion, which forms the same complex in a ring. In contrast, nitrites turn the whole solution brown and therefore interfere with that test.

=== Griess test ===
A common method of quantitative nitrite detection is the Griess test, which relies on the reaction of nitrite with the two components of a Griess reagent to form a red azo dye. This allows the concentration of nitrite to be determined by UV-vis spectroscopy.

== Urinary nitrite test ==
A nitrite test is a standard component of a urinary test strip. A positive test for nitrites in the urine is called nitrituria.

This test is commonly used in diagnosing urinary tract infections (UTIs). A positive nitrite test indicates that the cause of the UTI is a Gram-negative organism, most commonly Escherichia coli. The reason for nitrites' existence in the presence of a UTI is due to a bacterial conversion of endogenous nitrates to nitrites. This may be a sign of infection. However, other parameters, such as leukocyte esterase, urine white blood cell count, and symptoms such as dysuria, urinary urgency, fevers, and chills must be correlated to diagnose an infection.

False-negative nitrite tests in urinary tract infections occur in cases with a low colony forming unit (CFU) count, or in recently voided or dilute urine. In addition, a nitrite test does not detect organisms unable to reduce nitrate to nitrite, such as enterococci, staphylococci (Staphylococcus saprophyticus), Acinetobacter, or adenovirus.

== See also ==
- Nitrate test
- Saliva testing; salivary nitrite levels can serve as a surrogate biomarker for nitric oxide, a natural cardioprotective factor, derived from nitrate-rich leafy green vegetables which are often found in anti-hypertensive diets, such as the DASH diet
