= Mathieu Orfila =

Spanish toxicologist and chemist (1787–1853)

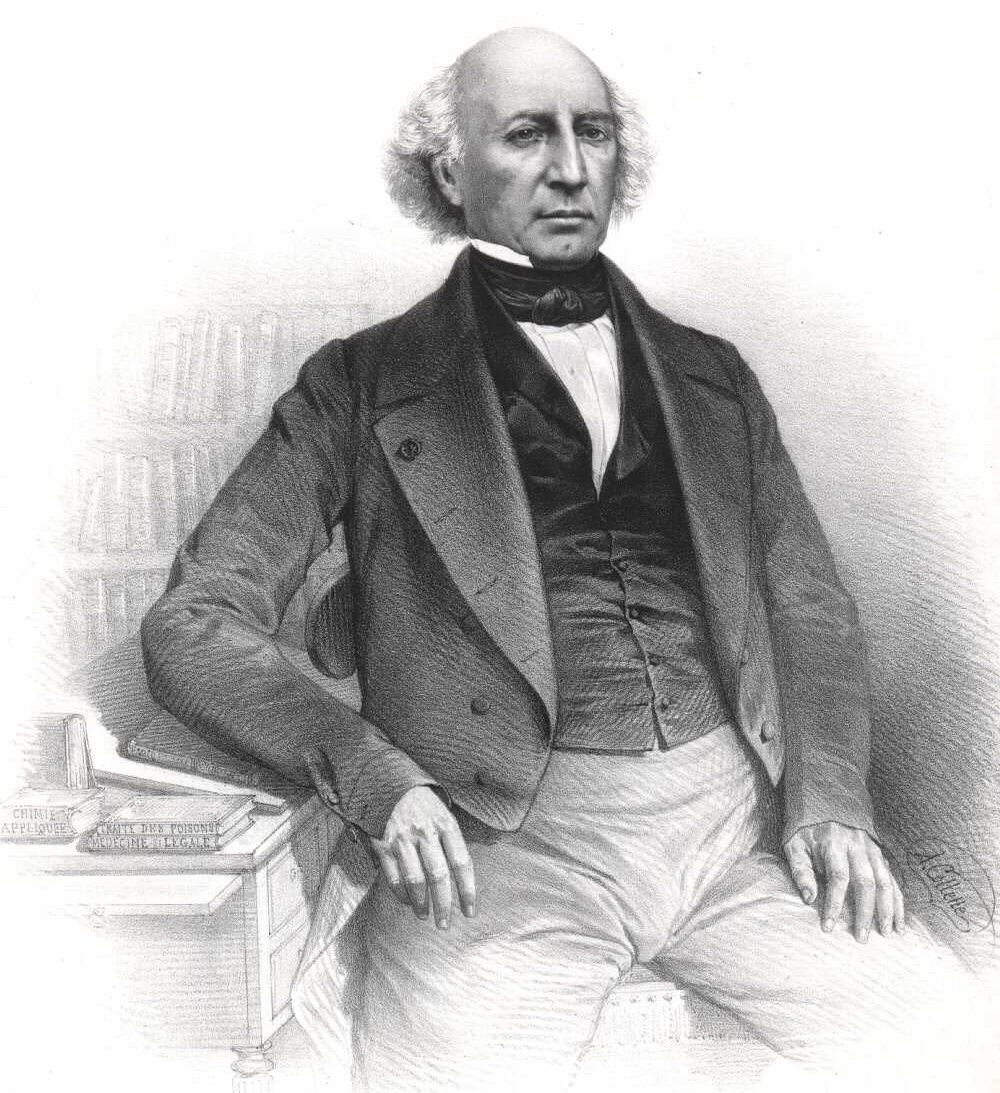
- Born: 24 April 1787; Mahón, Menorca, Kingdom of Spain
- Died: 12 March 1853 (aged 65); Paris, Île-de-France, French Empire
- Citizenship: Spanish
- Education: University of Valencia; University of Barcelona
- Known for: Founded toxicology
- Scientific career
- Fields: Toxicology and chemistry

Mathieu Joseph Bonaventure Orfila (Catalan: Mateu Josep Bonaventura Orfila i Rotger) (24 April 1787 – 12 March 1853) was a Spanish born French toxicologist and chemist, regarded as father of modern toxicology.

== Birth ==
Orfila was born in Minorca and went on to study medicine in Valencia, Barcelona, and finally Paris. Orfila was appointed as the royal physician to Louis XVIII in 1816. Orfila became a professor of chemistry at the Athénée of Paris in 1817. In 1819 he received French citizenship, having been born a Spanish subject. In 1830 he was appointed as the dean of the faculty of medicine, and later removed in 1848 during the revolution. In 1851 he became the president of the Academy of Medicine.

== Role in forensic toxicology ==
If there is reason to believe that a murder or attempted murder may have been committed using poison, a forensic toxicologist pharmaceutical is often engaged to examine pieces of evidence such as corpses and food items for poison content. In Orfila's time the primary type of poison in use was arsenic, but there were not any reliable ways of testing for its presence. Orfila created new techniques, refined existing techniques and described them in his first treatise, Traité des poisons (1813), greatly enhancing their accuracy.

Orfila's most notable contribution to the field of toxicology was his concept that poisons, when ingested, will be absorbed into the body and harm us through targeting specific organs, meaning there will be a build up of these toxins in those tissues. Orfila was able to prove he was capable of recovering arsenic from livers, spleens, hearts and certain muscle tissues. Orfila was capable of this by a 1836 new toxicological test, the Marsh test. This test was capable of detecting and quantifying arsenic concentration. Orfila took the method of the Marsh test and applied it to human tissues and thus to forensic toxicology. Orfila modified the Marsh test by changing the apparatus to be compatible with higher volumes of liquids. This allowed blood tests to be run since higher volumes were needed to acquire a sufficient amount of arsenic. Orfila utilized this modified test in many criminal cases, including the Lafarge and Mercier trials.

In 1840, Marie Lafarge was tried for the murder of her husband. Although she had had access to arsenic, and arsenic had been found in the victim's food, none could be found in the corpse. Orfila was asked by the court to investigate. He discovered that the test used, the Marsh test, had been performed incorrectly, and that there was in fact arsenic in the body; LaFarge was subsequently found guilty.

Orfila began the growth of forensic toxicology by bringing to the public eye. At the time, the French courts wanted expert reports to have zero presence of uncertainty or doubt. This made certain evidence less accepted in court due to jurors having to accept the experts' word on their tests. Since the marsh test separated arsenic from tissue and made a black metallic deposit it was clear evidence of its presence. Orfila used this to show jurors the evidence before their very eyes. This made him a great expert witness and made forensic toxicology a strong field of expert evidence.

== Reception of Orfila and his research ==
Orfila was a vast researcher of posions, writing textbooks about iodine, potassium nitrate and many more toxic substances. He studied the effects, potential antidotes and detection tests of these toxins through his more novel method of research; experimentation on dogs. This method of animal testing was common at the time for medical and poison testing, however Orfila's use of dogs was scrutinized by many colleagues.
