= Matthew Rothenberg =

American journalist

Matthew Rothenberg (born February 16, 1965) is an American journalist and co-author of "You're Better Than Your Job Search" with TheLadders.com CEO Marc Cenedella.

Rothenberg, the son of American poet Jerome Rothenberg, worked at MacWEEK in San Francisco. He was editor-in-chief of eWeek magazine and editorial director at Hachette Filipacchi Media U.S. and currently works as editor-in-chief at TheLadders, a leading site for senior-level job seekers.

Rothenberg is credited as being the first journalist to report the existence of the Apple iPad, writing in November, 2002 that the company was working on a “large iPod with no keyboard.” He had previously broken the news that Apple would release a version of its Mac OS X for the Intel platform and Adobe’s development of InDesign, then known by the name, “K2.”

In addition to his work at TheLadders, Rothenberg is a contributing blogger to CBS MoneyWatch.

Rothenberg is also the founder of Che Underground: The Blog, which documents San Diego's underground music scene of the late '70s and early '80s.
