= Jean-Baptiste-Alphonse Chevallier =

French pharmacist (1793–1879)

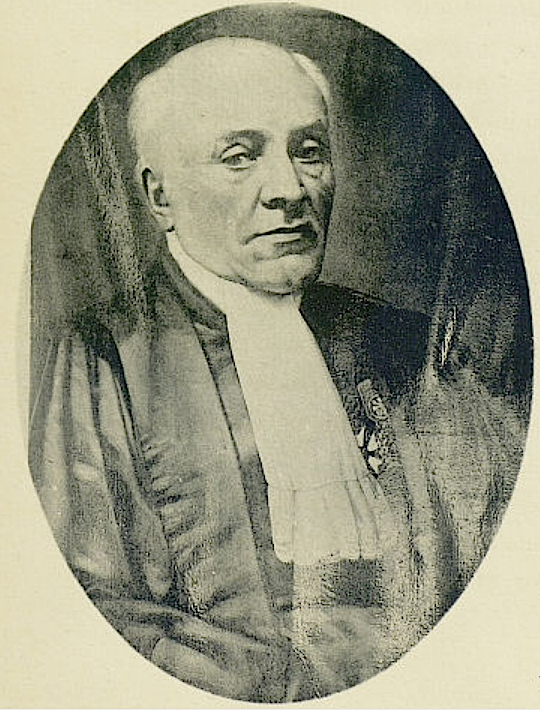

Jean-Baptiste-Alphonse Chevallier (19 July 1793 – 29 November 1879) was a French chemist who contributed to public health through techniques for the detection of adulteration of food and medicine. He also contributed to forensic medicine and toxicology. His major contribution was a two volume work Dictionnaire des altérations et falsifications des substances alimentaires, medicamenteuses et commerciales (1850-52) on adulteration and its detection.

Chevallier was born in Langres and moved to Paris at the age of fourteen, working as an assistant for the pharmacist P. F. G. Boullay. He also worked in the laboratory of Louis Nicolas Vauquelin in the Museum of Natural History. In 1812 he was conscripted into military service and saw action in Germany where he was injured at the Battle of Leipzig (October 16–19, 1813). He returned to Paris and worked at the Saint-Louis, La Pitié and Midi Hospitals before formally graduating from the Paris School of Pharmacy. He was elected to the Academy of Medicine in 1824. He opened his own shop and in 1835 he founded an analytical laboratory at Quai Saint-Michel. From 1831 he served on the government council on hygiene and health owing to his work on matters of public health. Among the works he undertook was on the use of hypochlorite for disinfection of Paris sewers. He became an assistant professor at the Paris School of Pharmacy in 1835. He published extensively in journals on public health, forensic and medico-legal matters. He examined matters of toxicology with Anselme Payen. In one case he was summoned to court related to a poisoning by acetate of morphine. He conducted experiments on himself to establish the symptoms. In 1848 he examined and compared the sewers of Paris, London and Montpellier. He served as an editor (and prolific contributor) of the Annales d'hygiène publique et de médecine légale from 1831 until his death.
