= Stibine =

- Skeletal formula of stibine

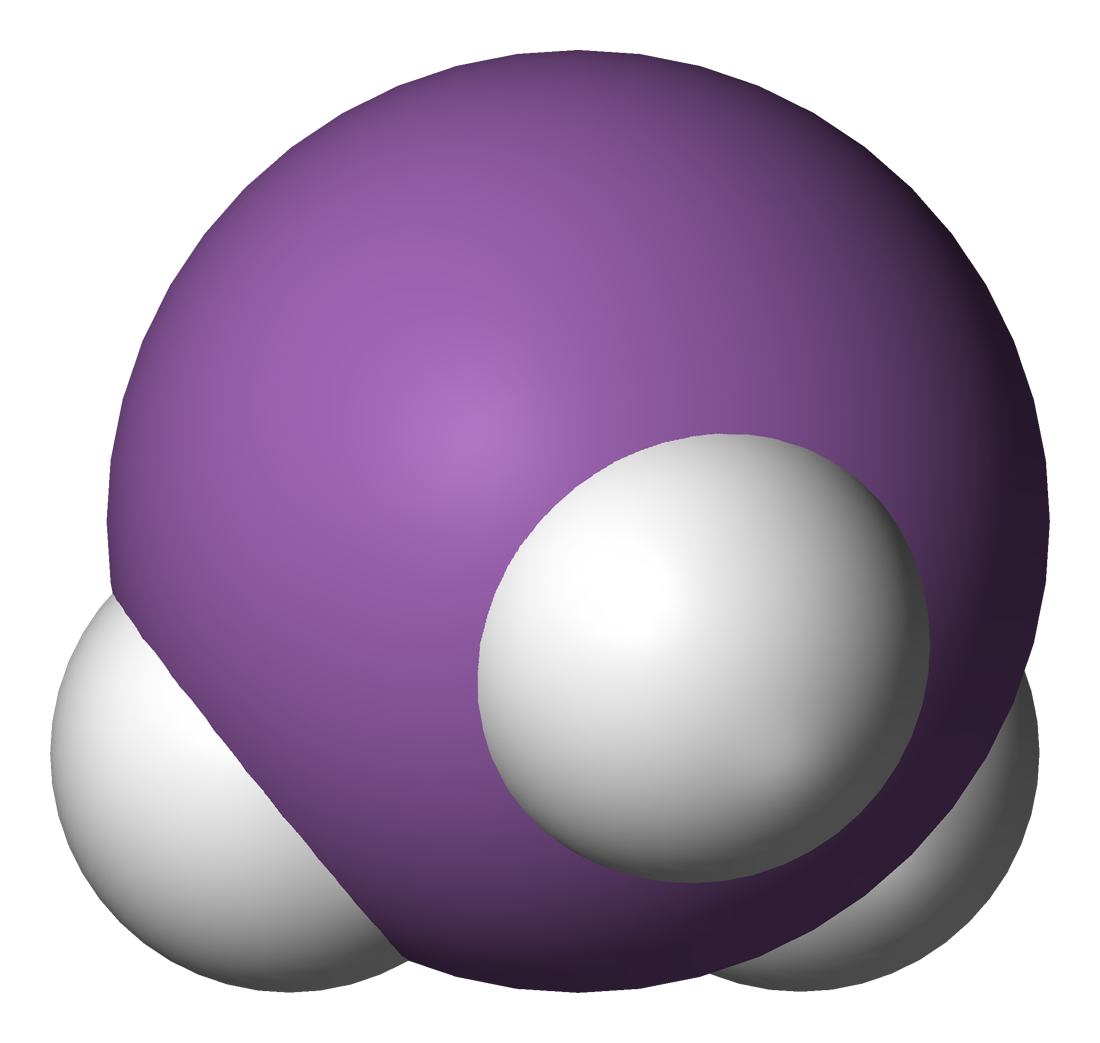
- Spacefill model of stibine Antimony, Sb Hydrogen, H

Names
- IUPAC name Stibane
- Other names Antimony trihydride Hydrogen antimonide

Identifiers
CAS Number	7803-52-3
3D model (JSmol)	Interactive image
ChEBI	CHEBI:30288
ChemSpider	8992
ECHA InfoCard	100.149.507
EC Number	620-578-3
Gmelin Reference	795
PubChem CID	9359
RTECS number	WJ0700000
UNII	0VKZ97K3UB
UN number	2676
CompTox Dashboard (EPA)	DTXSID601014341
- InChI: InChI=1S/Sb.3H Key: OUULRIDHGPHMNQ-UHFFFAOYSA-N; InChI=1/Sb.3H/rH3Sb/h1H3 Key: OUULRIDHGPHMNQ-LQMOCBGJAH
- SMILES: [SbH3]

Properties
Chemical formula	SbH_{3}
Molar mass	124.784 g·mol^{−1}
Appearance	Colourless gas
Odor	garlic-like
Density	5.48 g/L, gas
Melting point	−88 °C (−126 °F; 185 K)
Boiling point	−17 °C (1 °F; 256 K)
Solubility in water	slightly soluble
Solubility in ethanol	soluble
Vapor pressure	>1 atm (20°C)
Conjugate acid	Stibonium

Structure
Molecular shape	Trigonal pyramidal

Hazards
- Occupational safety and health (OHS/OSH)
Main hazards	Extremely toxic, flammable and highly reactive
- GHS labelling
Pictograms	(GHS02: Flammable) (GHS06: Toxic) (GHS08: Health hazard)
Signal word	Danger
Hazard statements	H220, H330, H370
Precautionary statements	P210, P260, P264, P270, P307+P311, P321, P377, P381, P403, P405, P501
NFPA 704 (fire diamond)	4 4 3
Flash point	Flammable gas
- Lethal dose or concentration (LD, LC)
LC_{Lo} (lowest published)	100 ppm (mouse, 1 hr); 92 ppm (guinea pig, 1 hr); 40 ppm (dog, 1 hr)
- NIOSH (US health exposure limits)
PEL (Permissible)	TWA 0.1 ppm (0.5 mg/m^{3})
REL (Recommended)	TWA 0.1 ppm (0.5 mg/m^{3})
IDLH (Immediate danger)	5 ppm

Related compounds
Related compounds	Ammonia; Phosphine; Arsine; Bismuthine; Triphenylstibine; Hydrogen telluride
- Except where otherwise noted, data are given for materials in their standard state (at 25 °C [77 °F], 100 kPa). verify (what is ?) Infobox references

Stibine (IUPAC name: stibane) is a chemical compound with the formula SbH_{3}. A pnictogen hydride, this colourless, highly toxic gas is the principal covalent hydride of antimony, and a heavy analogue of ammonia. The molecule is pyramidal with H–Sb–H angles of 91.7° and Sb–H distances of 170.7 pm (1.707 Å). The smell of this compound from usual sources (like from reduction of antimony compounds) is reminiscent of arsine, i.e. garlic-like. The term stibine is also used for the class of organoantimony(III) compounds of the formula SbH_{(3−x)}R_{x}, where R is a aryl group or alkyl group.

== Preparation ==
SbH_{3} is generally prepared by the reaction of Sb^{3+} sources with H^{−} equivalents:

4 Sb_{2}O_{3} + 6 LiAlH_{4} → 8 SbH_{3} + 3 Li_{2}O + 3 Al_{2}O_{3}
4 SbCl_{3} + 3 NaBH_{4} → 4 SbH_{3} + 3 NaCl + 3 BCl_{3}

Alternatively, sources of Sb^{3−} react with protonic reagents (even water) to also produce this unstable gas:

Na_{3}Sb + 3 H_{2}O → SbH_{3} + 3 NaOH

== Properties ==
The chemical properties of SbH_{3} resemble those for AsH_{3}. Typical for a heavy hydride (e.g. AsH_{3}, H_{2}Te, SnH_{4}), SbH_{3} is unstable with respect to its elements. The gas decomposes slowly at room temperature but rapidly at 200 °C:

2 SbH_{3} → 3 H_{2} + 2 Sb

The decomposition is autocatalytic and can be explosive.

SbH_{3} is readily oxidized by O_{2} or even air. Oxidation of by oxygen (air) gives the element:

4 SbH_{3} + 3 O_{2} → 4 Sb + 6 H_{2}O

Oxidation at low temperature give the metastable yellow allotrope,

SbH_{3} can be deprotonated:

SbH_{3} + NaNH_{2} → NaSbH_{2} + NH_{3}

The salt NaSbH_{2} is called sodium stibinide, and contains the stibinide anion SbH_{2}^{−}.

== Uses ==
Stibine is used in the semiconductor industry to dope silicon with small quantities of antimony via the process of chemical vapour deposition (CVD). It has also been used as a silicon dopant in epitaxial layers. Reports claim the use of SbH_{3} as a fumigant but its instability and awkward preparation contrast with the more conventional fumigant phosphine.

== History ==
Because stibine (SbH_{3}) is similar to arsine (AsH_{3}), it is also detected by the Marsh test. This sensitive test detects arsine generated in the presence of arsenic. This procedure, developed circa 1836 by James Marsh, treats a sample with arsenic-free zinc and dilute sulfuric acid: if the sample contains arsenic, gaseous arsine will form. The gas is swept into a glass tube and decomposed by means of heating around 250 – 300 °C. The presence of arsenic is indicated by formation of a deposit in the heated part of the equipment. The formation of a black mirror deposit in the cool part of the equipment indicates the presence of antimony.

In 1837 Lewis Thomson and Pfaff independently discovered stibine. It took some time before the properties of the toxic gas could be determined, partly because a suitable synthesis was not available. In 1876 Francis Jones tested several synthesis methods, but it was not before 1901 when Alfred Stock determined most of the properties of stibine.

== Safety ==
SbH_{3} is an unstable flammable gas. It is highly toxic, with an LC50 of 100 ppm in mice.

== Toxicology ==
The toxicity of stibine is distinct from that of other antimony compounds, but similar to that of arsine. Stibine binds to the haemoglobin of red blood cells, causing them to be destroyed by the body. Most cases of stibine poisoning have been accompanied by arsine poisoning, although animal studies indicate that their toxicities are equivalent. The first signs of exposure, which can take several hours to become apparent, are headaches, vertigo, and nausea, followed by the symptoms of hemolytic anemia (high levels of unconjugated bilirubin), hemoglobinuria, and nephropathy.

== See also ==
- Devarda's alloy, also used to produce arsine and stibine in the lab
- List of highly toxic gases
