= James Marsh (chemist) =

British chemist

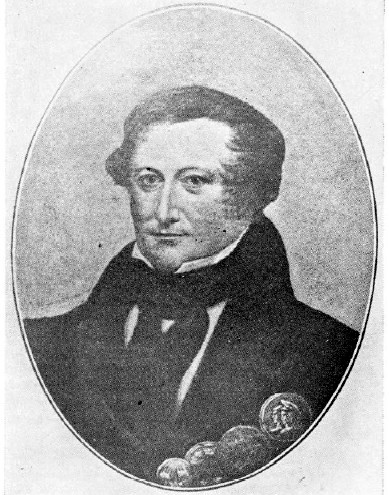
- James Marsh by an unknown artist, c.1840 (Note: As shown in the colour portrait on which this is based, from left to right his medals are a silver one from the Crown Prince of Sweden, a silver one from the Board of Ordnance for inventing "quill percussion tubes for ships' cannon", a gold one from the Society for the Encouragement of Arts, Manufactures and Commerce for his invention of the Marsh test, and a silver one from the same Society in 1823 for his invention "of electro-magnetic apparatus" (i.e. the interrupter).)
- Born: 2 September 1794; Kent, England
- Died: 21 June 1846 (aged 51)
- Occupation: Chemist
- Spouse: Mary Marsh

James Marsh (2 September 1794 – 21 June 1846) was a British chemist who invented the Marsh test for detecting arsenic.

== Life ==
He was born at an unknown location in Kent. (Note: Alfred Webb's A Compendium of Irish Biography inaccurately describes Marsh as a "Dublin physician".) The baptismal register entries for his daughters Eleanor and Lavinia in 1817 and 1821 respectively both record James as a labourer, living at Rush Grove Place in Woolwich, whereas that for his only son James Frederic in 1825 states that he was then a sergeant in the Royal Artillery.

He later held the post of Ordnance Chemist at the Royal Arsenal at Woolwich, on a weekly wage of only 30 shillings. He also worked as an assistant to Michael Faraday at the nearby Royal Military Academy from 1829 to 1846. His two surviving daughters and his widow were "left unprovided for" upon his death.

== Marriage and issue ==
He was married to Mary, and had four children:

- Eleanor Waters Marsh (October 1816 - September 1817 (Note: The baptismal register at St Mary Magdalene Woolwich includes her on 17 August 1817 and the burial records at the same church record her on 28 September 1817 aged 11 months.)
- Lavinia Bithiah (1821–1896) (Note: Baptised at St Mary Magdalene 9 September 1821.)
- James Frederic Marsh (14 August 1825 - 1826) (Note: Baptised at St Mary Magdalene on 2 October 1825 and buried at the same church on 17 September 1826.)
- Lucretia Victoria (1829–1910)

== Scientific work ==
=== Interrupter ===
Marsh Interrupter

Marsh invented the earliest form of vibrating electrical interrupter in 1824. It consisted of a straight wire electrically connected and flexibly suspended at the top while the lower end extending into a shallow mercury filled trough which served as a second electrical contact. The lower end of the wire was also positioned between the poles of a powerful permanent horseshoe-shaped magnet.

When electric current flowed through the wire, the magnetic field of the wire created a force with the field of the permanent magnet such that the wire would rotate out of the mercury trough and interrupt the electrical circuit. Without the magnetic force, the wire would then fall back due to the force of gravity into the mercury thereby restoring the connection and restarting the cycle of vibration. It and another invention (possibly the percussion tube) appear in the background of a c.1840 painted portrait of him now in the collection of the Royal Greenwich Heritage Trust.

=== The test ===
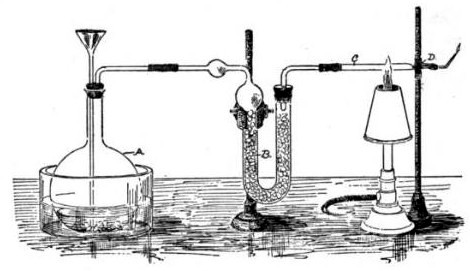
Apparatus for the Marsh test

In 1833 Marsh was called as a chemist by the prosecution in a murder trial, wherein a certain John Bodle was accused of poisoning his grandfather with arsenic-laced coffee. Marsh performed the standard test by mixing a suspected sample with hydrogen sulfide and hydrochloric acid. While he was able to detect arsenic as yellow arsenic trisulfide, when it came to showing it to the jury it had deteriorated, allowing the suspect to be acquitted due to reasonable doubt.

Annoyed by this, Marsh developed a much better test. He combined a sample containing arsenic with sulfuric acid and arsenic-free zinc, resulting in arsine gas. The gas was ignited, and it decomposed to pure metallic arsenic which, when passed to a cold surface, would appear as a silvery-black deposit. So sensitive was the test that it could detect as little as one-fiftieth of a milligram of arsenic. He first described this test in the Edinburgh Philosophical Journal in 1836, with that paper translated into French by Jean-Baptiste-Alphonse Chevallier and Jules Barse in 1843, and into German by A. L. Fromm in 1842.

=== Other inventions ===
While Marsh was most famous for inventing the test that bears his name, he was also a skilled and inventive scientist. He developed the screw time fuze for mortar shells and in 1830 the percussion tube. In 1832 HMS Castor was the first ship to have her guns modified with these innovations. They were not approved for the Army until 1845, when Woolwich began their manufacture for coastal artillery only. They became obsolete in 1866.
