= Arsine =

Chemical compound

- Skeletal formula of arsine

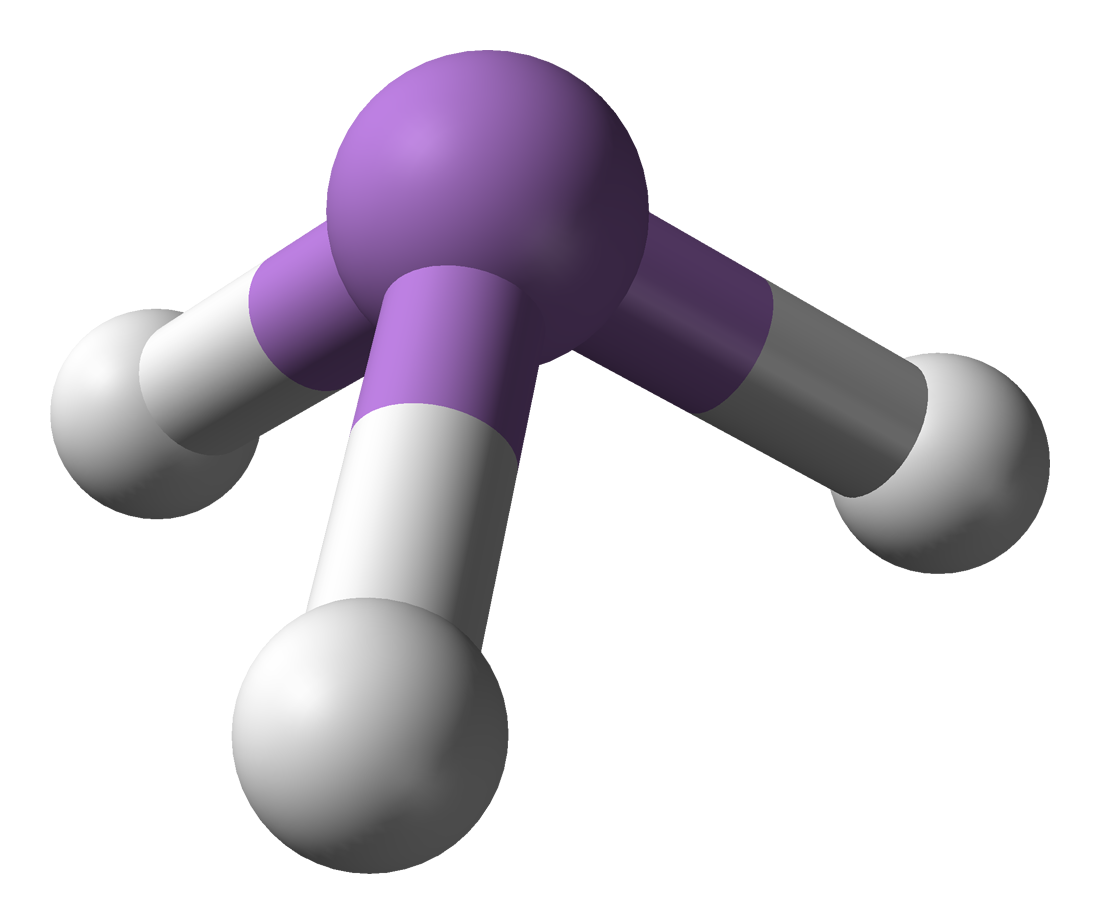
Ball-and-stick model of arsine
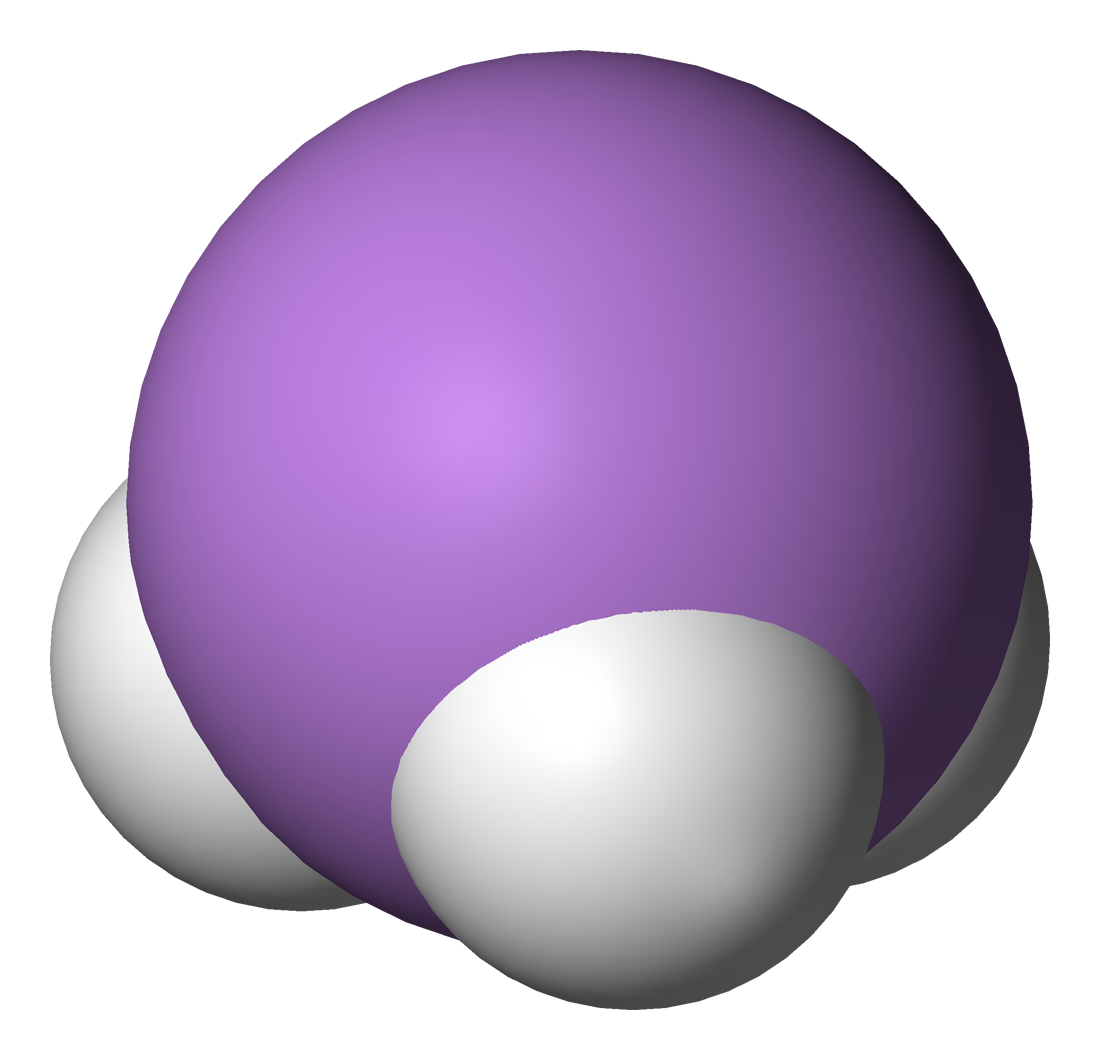
Spacefill model of arsine
Arsenic, As
Hydrogen, H

Names
- IUPAC names Arsenic trihydride Arsane; Trihydridoarsenic
- Other names Arseniuretted hydrogen, Arsenous hydride, Hydrogen arsenide Arsenic hydride

Identifiers
CAS Number	7784-42-1
3D model (JSmol)	Interactive image
ChEBI	CHEBI:47217
ChEMBL	ChEMBL1231052
ChemSpider	22408
ECHA InfoCard	100.029.151
EC Number	232-066-3
Gmelin Reference	599
KEGG	C06269
PubChem CID	23969
RTECS number	CG6475000
UNII	V1I29R0RJQ
UN number	2188
CompTox Dashboard (EPA)	DTXSID3023760
- InChI: InChI=1S/AsH3/h1H3 Key: RBFQJDQYXXHULB-UHFFFAOYSA-N; InChI=1/AsH3/h1H3 Key: RBFQJDQYXXHULB-UHFFFAOYAH
- SMILES: [AsH3]

Properties
Chemical formula	AsH_{3}
Molar mass	77.9454 g/mol
Appearance	Colourless gas
Odor	Faint, garlic-like
Density	4.93 g/L, gas; 1.640 g/mL (−64 °C)
Melting point	−111.2 °C (−168.2 °F; 162.0 K)
Boiling point	−62.5 °C (−80.5 °F; 210.7 K)
Solubility in water	0.2 g/100 mL (20 °C); 0.07 g/100 mL (25 °C)
Solubility	soluble in chloroform, benzene
Vapor pressure	14.9 atm
Conjugate acid	Arsonium

Structure
Molecular shape	Trigonal pyramidal
Dipole moment	0.20 D

Thermochemistry
Std molar entropy (S^{⦵}_{298})	223 J⋅K^{−1}⋅mol^{−1}
Std enthalpy of formation (Δ_{f}H^{⦵}_{298})	+66.4 kJ/mol

Hazards
- Occupational safety and health (OHS/OSH)
Main hazards	Extremely toxic, explosive, flammable, potential occupational carcinogen
- GHS labelling
Pictograms	(GHS02: Flammable) (GHS06: Toxic) (GHS08: Health hazard) (GHS09: Environmental hazard)
Signal word	Danger
Hazard statements	H220, H330, H373, H410
Precautionary statements	P210, P260, P271, P273, P284, P304+P340, P310, P314, P320, P377, P381, P391, P403, P403+P233, P405, P501
NFPA 704 (fire diamond)	4 4 2
Flash point	−62 °C (−80 °F; 211 K)
Explosive limits	5.1–78%
- Lethal dose or concentration (LD, LC)
LD_{50} (median dose)	2.5 mg/kg (intravenous)
LC_{50} (median concentration)	120 ppm (rat, 10 min); 77 ppm (mouse, 10 min); 201 ppm (rabbit, 10 min); 108 ppm (dog, 10 min)
LC_{Lo} (lowest published)	250 ppm (human, 30 min); 300 ppm (human, 5 min); 25 ppm (human, 30 min)
- NIOSH (US health exposure limits)
PEL (Permissible)	TWA 0.05 ppm (0.2 mg/m^{3})
REL (Recommended)	C 0.002 mg/m^{3} [15-minute]
IDLH (Immediate danger)	3 ppm

Related compounds
Related hydrides	Ammonia; Phosphine; Stibine; Bismuthine
Related compounds	Hydrogen selenide

Supplementary data page
- Arsine (data page)
- Except where otherwise noted, data are given for materials in their standard state (at 25 °C [77 °F], 100 kPa). verify (what is ?) Infobox references

Arsine (IUPAC name: arsane) is an inorganic compound with the formula AsH_{3}. This flammable, pyrophoric, and highly toxic pnictogen hydride gas is one of the simplest compounds of arsenic. Despite its lethality, it finds some applications in the semiconductor industry and for the synthesis of organoarsenic compounds. The term arsine is commonly used to describe a class of organoarsenic compounds of the formula AsH_{3−x}R_{x}, where R = aryl or alkyl. For example, As(C_{6}H_{5})_{3}, called triphenylarsine, is referred to as "an arsine".

== General properties ==
In its standard state arsine is a colorless, denser-than-air gas that is slightly soluble in water (2% at 20 °C) and in many organic solvents as well. Arsine itself is odorless, but it oxidizes in air and this creates a slight garlic or fish-like scent when the compound is present above 0.5 ppm. This compound is kinetically stable: at room temperature it decomposes only slowly. At temperatures of ca. 230 °C, decomposition to arsenic and hydrogen is sufficiently rapid to be the basis of the Marsh test for arsenic presence. Similar to stibine, the decomposition of arsine is autocatalytic, as the arsenic freed during the reaction acts as a catalyst for the same reaction. Several other factors, such as humidity, presence of light and certain catalysts (namely alumina) facilitate the rate of decomposition.

AsH_{3} is a trigonal pyramidal molecule with H–As–H angles of 91.8° and three equivalent As–H bonds, each of 1.519 Å (151.9 pm) length.

== Discovery and synthesis ==
AsH_{3} is generally prepared by the reaction of As^{3+} sources with H^{−} equivalents.

4 AsCl_{3} + 3 NaBH_{4} → 4 AsH_{3} + 3 NaCl + 3 BCl_{3}

As reported in 1775, Carl Scheele reduced arsenic(III) oxide with zinc in the presence of acid. This reaction is a prelude to the Marsh test.

Alternatively, sources of As^{3−} react with protonic reagents to also produce this gas. Zinc arsenide and sodium arsenide are suitable precursors:

Zn_{3}As_{2} + 6 H^{+} → 2 AsH_{3} + 3 Zn^{2+}
Na_{3}As + 3 HBr → AsH_{3} + 3 NaBr

== Reactions ==
The understanding of the chemical properties of AsH_{3} is well developed and can be anticipated based on an average of the behavior of pnictogen counterparts, such as PH_{3} and SbH_{3}.

=== Thermal decomposition ===
Typical for a heavy hydride (e.g., SbH_{3}, H_{2}Te, SnH_{4}), AsH_{3} is unstable with respect to its elements. In other words, it is stable kinetically but not thermodynamically.

2 AsH_{3} → 3 H_{2} + 2 As

This decomposition reaction is the basis of the Marsh test, which detects elemental As.

=== Oxidation ===
Continuing the analogy to SbH_{3}, AsH_{3} is readily oxidized by concentrated O_{2} or the dilute O_{2} concentration in air:

2 AsH_{3} + 3 O_{2} → As_{2}O_{3} + 3 H_{2}O

Arsine will react violently in presence of strong oxidizing agents, such as potassium permanganate, sodium hypochlorite, or nitric acid.

=== Precursor to metallic derivatives ===
AsH_{3} is used as a precursor to metal complexes of "naked" (or "nearly naked") arsenic. An example is the dimanganese species [(C_{5}H_{5})Mn(CO)_{2}]_{2}AsH, wherein the Mn_{2}AsH core is planar.

=== Gutzeit test ===
A characteristic test for arsenic involves the reaction of AsH_{3} with Ag^{+}, called the Gutzeit test for arsenic (see Sanger–Black apparatus for more). Although this test has become obsolete in analytical chemistry, the underlying reactions further illustrate the affinity of AsH_{3} for "soft" metal cations. In the Gutzeit test, AsH_{3} is generated by reduction of aqueous arsenic compounds, typically arsenites, with Zn in the presence of H_{2}SO_{4}. The evolved gaseous AsH_{3} is then exposed to AgNO_{3} either as powder or as a solution. With solid AgNO_{3}, AsH_{3} reacts to produce yellow Ag_{4}AsNO_{3}, whereas AsH_{3} reacts with a solution of AgNO_{3} to give black Ag_{3}As.

=== Acid-base reactions ===
The acidic properties of the As–H bond are often exploited. Thus, AsH_{3} can be deprotonated:

AsH_{3} + NaNH_{2} → NaAsH_{2} + NH_{3}

Upon reaction with the aluminium trialkyls, AsH_{3} gives the trimeric [R_{2}AlAsH_{2}]_{3}, where R = (CH_{3})_{3}C. This reaction is relevant to the mechanism by which GaAs forms from AsH_{3} (see below).

AsH_{3} is generally considered non-basic, but it can be protonated by superacids to give isolable salts of the tetrahedral species [AsH_{4}]^{+}.

=== Reaction with halogen compounds ===
Reactions of arsine with the halogens (fluorine and chlorine) or some of their compounds, such as nitrogen trichloride, are extremely dangerous and can result in explosions.

=== Catenation ===
In contrast to the behavior of PH_{3}, AsH_{3} does not form stable chains, although diarsine (or diarsane) H_{2}As–AsH_{2}, and even triarsane H_{2}As–As(H)–AsH_{2} have been detected. The diarsine is unstable above −100 °C.

== Applications ==
=== Microelectronics applications ===
AsH_{3} is used in the synthesis of semiconducting materials related to microelectronics and solid-state lasers. Related to phosphorus, arsenic is an n-dopant for silicon and germanium. More importantly, AsH_{3} is used to make the semiconductor GaAs by chemical vapor deposition (CVD) at 700–900 °C:

Ga(CH_{3})_{3} + AsH_{3} → GaAs + 3 CH_{4}

For microelectronic applications, arsine can be provided by a sub-atmospheric gas source (a source that supplies less than atmospheric pressure). In this type of gas package, the arsine is adsorbed on a solid microporous adsorbent inside a gas cylinder. This method allows the gas to be stored without pressure, significantly reducing the risk of an arsine gas leak from the cylinder. With this apparatus, arsine is obtained by applying vacuum to the gas cylinder valve outlet. For semiconductor manufacturing, this method is feasible, as processes such as ion implantation operate under high vacuum.

=== Chemical warfare ===
Since before WWII AsH_{3} was proposed as a possible chemical warfare weapon. The gas is colorless, almost odorless, and 2.5 times denser than air, as required for a blanketing effect sought in chemical warfare. It is also lethal in concentrations far lower than those required to smell its garlic-like scent. In spite of these characteristics, arsine was never officially used as a weapon, because of its high flammability and its lower efficacy when compared to the non-flammable alternative phosgene. On the other hand, several organic compounds based on arsine, such as lewisite (β-chlorovinyldichloroarsine), adamsite (diphenylaminechloroarsine), Clark 1 (diphenylchloroarsine) and Clark 2 (diphenylcyanoarsine) have been effectively developed for use in chemical warfare.

== Forensic science and the Marsh test ==
AsH_{3} is well known in forensic science because it is a chemical intermediate in the detection of arsenic poisoning. The old (but extremely sensitive) Marsh test generates AsH_{3} in the presence of arsenic. This procedure, published in 1836 by James Marsh, is based upon treating an As-containing sample of a victim's body (typically the stomach contents) with As-free zinc and dilute sulfuric acid: if the sample contains arsenic, gaseous arsine will form. The gas is swept into a glass tube and decomposed by means of heating around 250–300 °C. The presence of As is indicated by formation of a deposit in the heated part of the equipment. On the other hand, the appearance of a black mirror deposit in the cool part of the equipment indicates the presence of antimony (the highly unstable SbH_{3} decomposes even at low temperatures).

The Marsh test was widely used by the end of the 19th century and the start of the 20th; nowadays more sophisticated techniques such as atomic spectroscopy, inductively coupled plasma, and x-ray fluorescence analysis are employed in the forensic field. Though neutron activation analysis was used to detect trace levels of arsenic in the mid 20th century, it has since fallen out of use in modern forensics.

== Toxicology ==
The toxicity of arsine is distinct from that of other arsenic compounds. The main route of exposure is by inhalation, although poisoning after skin contact has also been described. Arsine attacks hemoglobin in the red blood cells, causing them to be destroyed by the body.

The first signs of exposure, which can take several hours to become apparent, are headaches, vertigo, and nausea, followed by the symptoms of haemolytic anaemia (high levels of unconjugated bilirubin), haemoglobinuria and nephropathy. In severe cases, the damage to the kidneys can be long-lasting.

Exposure to arsine concentrations of 250 ppm is rapidly fatal: concentrations of 25–30 ppm are fatal for 30 min exposure, and concentrations of 10 ppm can be fatal at longer exposure times. Symptoms of poisoning appear after exposure to concentrations of 0.5 ppm. There is little information on the chronic toxicity of arsine, although it is reasonable to assume that, in common with other arsenic compounds, a long-term exposure could lead to arsenicosis.

Arsine is a potent hemolytic agent, which is in line with its pathophysiological course of action. However, inhaling high concentrations of this agent is highly capable of inducing severe and direct pulmonary trauma. From a strictly clinical perspective, this typically manifests as chemical pneumonitis as well as non-cardiogenic pulmonary edema. Generally, pathological examinations of the acute fatal cases of arsine poisoning have positively identified two primary mechanisms of pulmonary injury:

1. Diffuse Alveolar Damage: This is characterized by extensive pulmonary edema, where the alveoli become diffusely infiltrated with leukocytes and fluid. This results in a cellular exudate that fills the air spaces, and therefore severely compromising and constraining the process of physiological gaseous exchange.
2. Necrotizing Bronchitis: This involves direct damage to the primary pulmonary conducting airways. In such instances, the smaller bronchi and bronchioles could potentially become surrounded by inflammatory cells and necrotic tissue. This damage to the epithelium can lead to focal lesions resembling bronchopneumonia.

Both manifestations are capable of leading to respiratory failure and death, often occurring at the same time as acute renal failure caused by hemolytic injury.

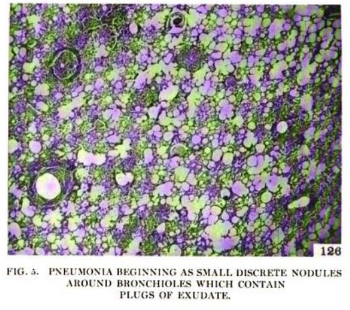
Pneumonia forming

It is classified as an extremely hazardous substance in the United States as defined in Section 302 of the U.S. Emergency Planning and Community Right-to-Know Act (42 U.S.C. 11002), and is subject to strict reporting requirements by facilities which produce, store, or use it in significant quantities.

=== Occupational exposure limits ===
Country	Limit
Argentina	TLV-TWA 0.005 ppm
Australia	TWA 0.05 ppm (0.16 mg/m^{3})
Austria	MAK-TMW 0.05 ppm (0.2 mg/m^{3}); KZW 0.25 ppm (1 mg/m^{3})
Belgium	TWA 0.05 ppm (0.16 mg/m^{3})
Bulgaria	TLV-TWA 0.005 ppm
British Columbia, Canada	TLV-TWA 0.005 ppm
Colombia	TLV-TWA 0.005 ppm
Denmark	TWA 0.01 ppm (0.03 mg/m^{3})
Egypt	TWA 0.05 ppm (0.2 mg/m^{3})
Finland	TWA 0.01 mg(As)/m^{3}
France	VME 0.05 ppm (0.2 mg/m^{3}); VLE 0.2 ppm (0.8 mg/m^{3})
Hungary	TWA 0.2 mg/m^{3}; STEL 0.8 mg/m^{3}
Japan	Occupational exposure limit 0.01 ppm (0.32 mg/m^{3}); Ceiling 0.1 ppm (0.32 mg/m^{3})
Jordan	TLV-TWA 0.005 ppm
Mexico	TWA 0.05 ppm (0.2 mg/m^{3})
Netherlands	MAC-TCG 0.2 mg/m^{3}
New Zealand	TWA 0.05 ppm (0.16 mg/m^{3}); TWA 0.05 mg(As)/m^{3} (Carcinogen)
Norway	TWA 0.003 ppm (0.01 mg/m^{3})
Peru	TWA 0.05 ppm (0.16 mg/m^{3})
Philippines	0.05 ppm (0.5 mg/m^{3})
Poland	MAC (TWA) (0.2 mg/m^{3}); MAC (STEL) (0.6 mg/m^{3})
Russia	STEL (0.1 mg/m^{3})
Singapore	TLV-TWA 0.005 ppm
South Korea	TWA 0.2 mg(As)/m^{3}
Sweden	TWA 0.02 ppm (0.05 mg/m^{3})
Switzerland	MAK-week 0.05 ppm (0.16 mg/m^{3})
Thailand	TWA 0.05 ppm (0.2 mg/m^{3})
Turkey	TWA 0.05 ppm (0.2 mg/m^{3})
United Kingdom	TWA 0.05 ppm (0.16 mg/m^{3})
United States	ACGIH TLV-TWA 0.005 ppm; MSHA TWA 0.05 ppm (0.2 mg/m^{3}); OSHA TWA (8h) 0.05 ppm (0.2 mg/m^{3})
Vietnam	TLV-TWA 0.005 ppm

== See also ==
- Cacodylic acid
- Cacodyl oxide
- Devarda's alloy, also used to produce arsine in the lab
- List of highly toxic gases
- Scheele's Green, a pigment popularly used in the early 19th century
