= Pentamethylmolybdenum =

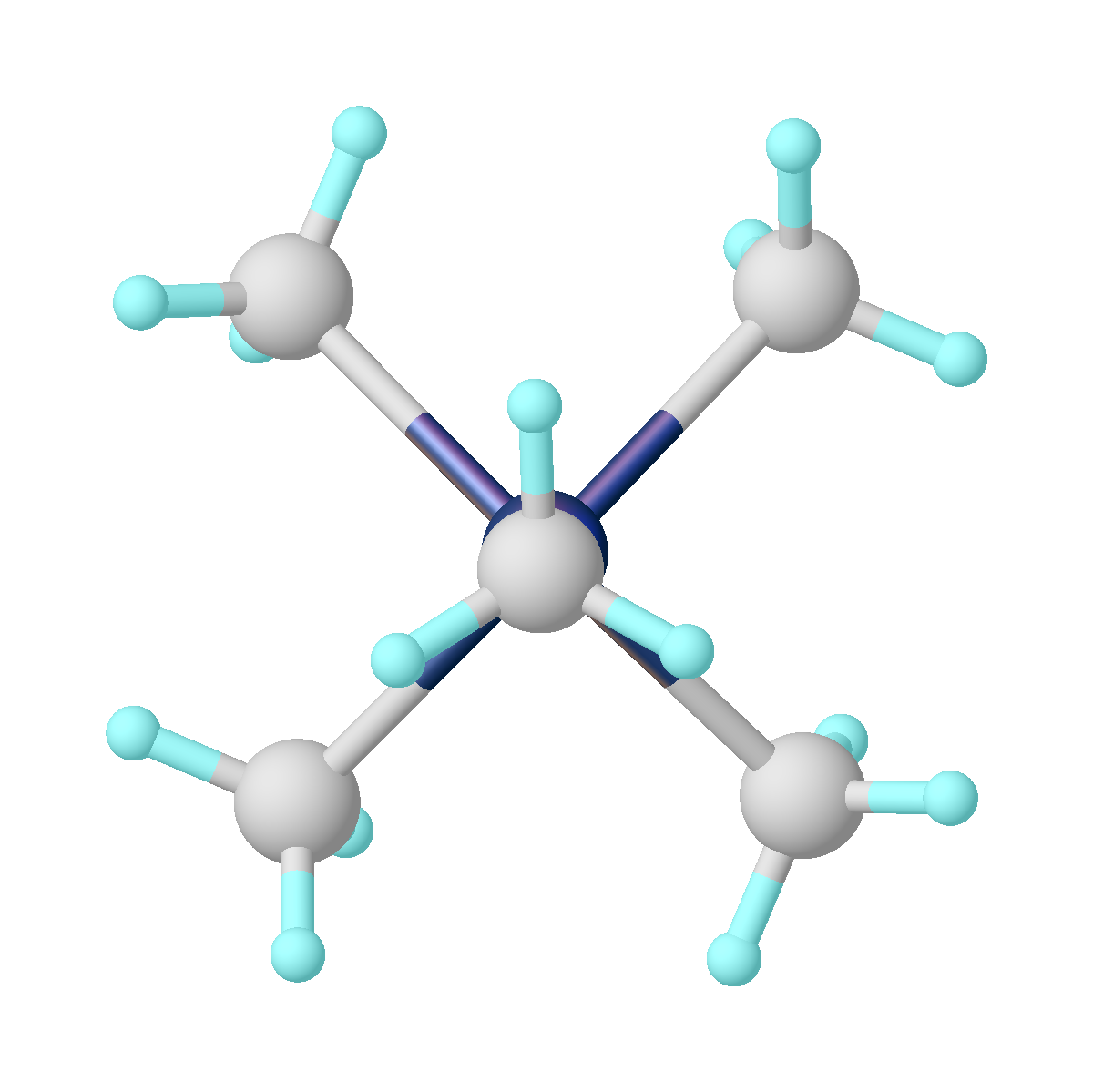

Identifiers
CAS Number	287715-39-3
3D model (JSmol)	Interactive image
ChemSpider	63001354
PubChem CID	15520647
- InChI: InChI=1S/5CH3.Mo/h5*1H3;/q5*-1;+5 Key: ILRMVGULUOSRQX-UHFFFAOYSA-N
- SMILES: C[Mo](C)(C)(C)C

Properties
Chemical formula	C_{5}H_{15}Mo
Molar mass	171.13 g·mol^{−1}
Appearance	turquoise blue crystals
Boiling point	decomposes at −10°C

Structure
Crystal structure	tetragonal
Space group	I4
Lattice constant	a = 7.680, b = 7.680, c = 6.490
Lattice volume (V)	382.80
Formula units (Z)	2

Related compounds
Related compounds	Pentamethylarsenic; Pentamethylbismuth; Pentamethylantimony pentamethyltantalum Hexamethylmolybdenum
- Except where otherwise noted, data are given for materials in their standard state (at 25 °C [77 °F], 100 kPa). Infobox references

Pentamethylmolybdenum is an organomolybdenum compound containing five methyl groups bound to a central molybdenum atom. The shape of the molecule is a square pyramid.

== Production ==
Pentamethylmolybdenum can be prepared from molybdenum pentachloride and dimethyl zinc at low temperature between −70 and −20. Another possible creation route is from molybdenum oxychloride. Pentamethylmolybdenum is paramagnetic with one unpaired electron. The character of this electron is two thirds 4d_{z^{2}} and one third 4d_{x^{2}−y^{2}}.

== Properties ==
Pentamethylmolybdenum is unstable and sensitive to oxygen. It turns black when exposed to air, or heated over −10°C. The Raman spectrum has bands at 1181, 960, 90, 882, 783, 672, 620, 565, 523, 507, 451, 366, 308, 267 and 167 cm^{−1}.
