= Pnictogen =

Group 15 elements of the periodic table with valency 5

Pnictogens
Hydrogen																															Helium
Lithium	Beryllium																									Boron	Carbon	Nitrogen	Oxygen	Fluorine	Neon
Sodium	Magnesium																									Aluminium	Silicon	Phosphorus	Sulfur	Chlorine	Argon
Potassium	Calcium															Scandium	Titanium	Vanadium	Chromium	Manganese	Iron	Cobalt	Nickel	Copper	Zinc	Gallium	Germanium	Arsenic	Selenium	Bromine	Krypton
Rubidium	Strontium															Yttrium	Zirconium	Niobium	Molybdenum	Technetium	Ruthenium	Rhodium	Palladium	Silver	Cadmium	Indium	Tin	Antimony	Tellurium	Iodine	Xenon
Caesium	Barium	Lanthanum	Cerium	Praseodymium	Neodymium	Promethium	Samarium	Europium	Gadolinium	Terbium	Dysprosium	Holmium	Erbium	Thulium	Ytterbium	Lutetium	Hafnium	Tantalum	Tungsten	Rhenium	Osmium	Iridium	Platinum	Gold	Mercury (element)	Thallium	Lead	Bismuth	Polonium	Astatine	Radon
Francium	Radium	Actinium	Thorium	Protactinium	Uranium	Neptunium	Plutonium	Americium	Curium	Berkelium	Californium	Einsteinium	Fermium	Mendelevium	Nobelium	Lawrencium	Rutherfordium	Dubnium	Seaborgium	Bohrium	Hassium	Meitnerium	Darmstadtium	Roentgenium	Copernicium	Nihonium	Flerovium	Moscovium	Livermorium	Tennessine	Oganesson
carbon group ← → chalcogens
IUPAC group number	15
Name by element	nitrogen group
Trivial name	pnictogens, pentels
CAS group number (US, pattern A-B-A)	VA
old IUPAC number (Europe, pattern A-B)	VB

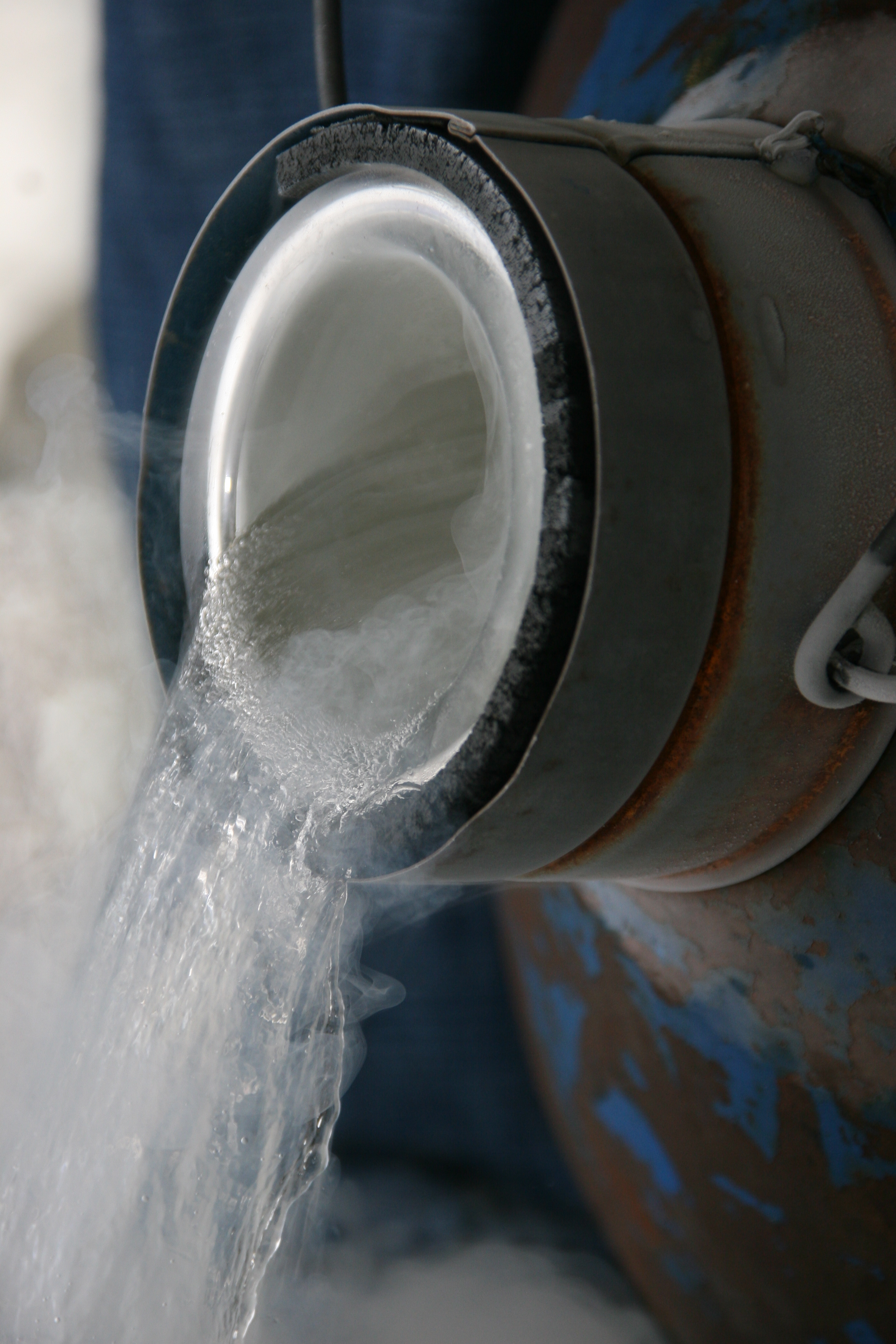
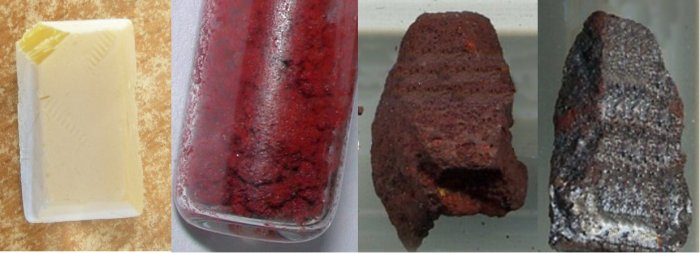
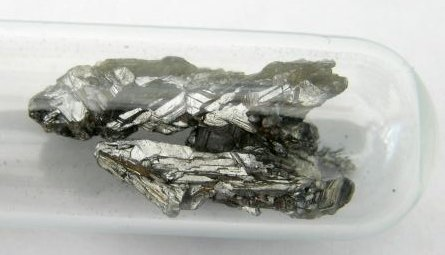
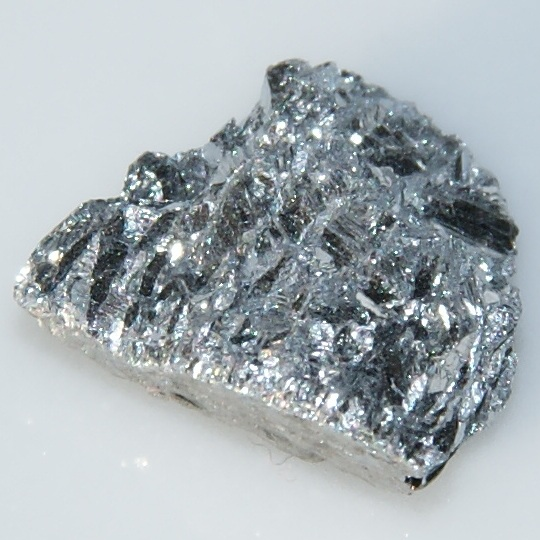
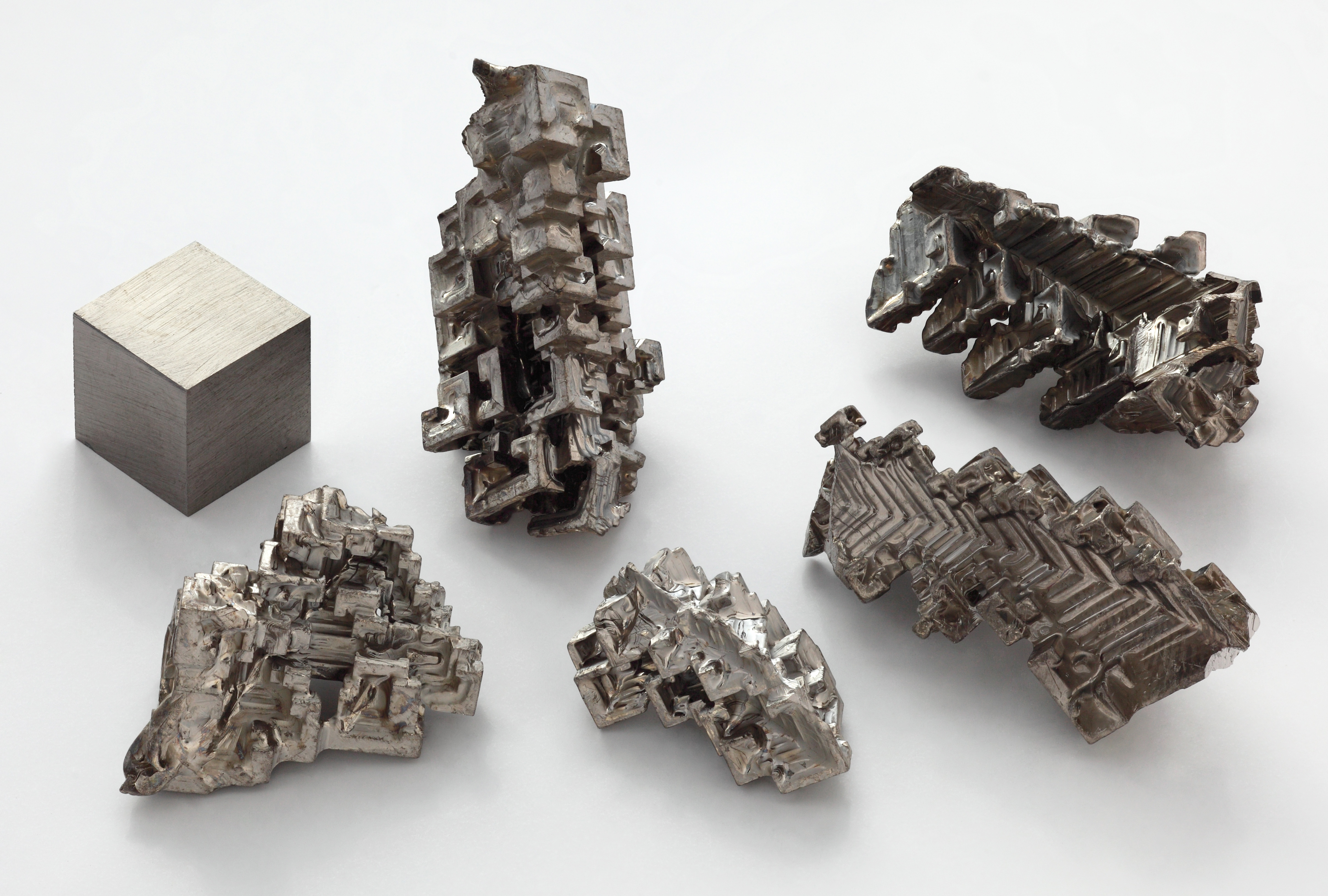
↓ Period
2	Nitrogen (N); 7 Other nonmetal
3	Phosphorus (P); 15 Other nonmetal
4	Arsenic (As); 33 Metalloid
5	Antimony (Sb); 51 Metalloid
6	Bismuth (Bi); 83 Other metal
7	Moscovium (Mc); 115 other metal
Legend primordial element synthetic element Atomic number color: red=gas, black=solid

A pnictogen (/ˈ(p)nɪktədʒən/; from Ancient Greek πνίγω (pnígō) 'to choke' and -gen 'generator') is any of the chemical elements in group 15 of the periodic table. Group 15 is also known as the nitrogen group or nitrogen family. Group 15 consists of the elements nitrogen (N), phosphorus (P), arsenic (As), antimony (Sb), bismuth (Bi), and moscovium (Mc).

The IUPAC has called it Group 15 since 1988. Before that, in America it was called Group VA, owing to a text by H. C. Deming and the Sargent-Welch Scientific Company, while in Europe it was called Group VB, which the IUPAC had recommended in 1970. (Pronounced "group five A" and "group five B"; "V" is the Roman numeral 5.) In semiconductor physics, it is still usually called Group V. The "five" ("V") in the historical names comes from the "pentavalency" of nitrogen, reflected by the stoichiometry of compounds such as N_{2}O_{5}. They have also been called the pentels.

== Characteristics ==
=== Chemical ===
Like other groups, the members of this family manifest similar patterns in electron configuration, notably in their valence shells, resulting in trends in chemical behavior.

Z	Element	Electrons per shell
7	nitrogen	2, 5
15	phosphorus	2, 8, 5
33	arsenic	2, 8, 18, 5
51	antimony	2, 8, 18, 18, 5
83	bismuth	2, 8, 18, 32, 18, 5
115	moscovium	2, 8, 18, 32, 32, 18, 5 (predicted)

This group has the defining characteristic whereby each component element has 5 electrons in their valence shell, that is, 2 electrons in the s sub-shell and 3 unpaired electrons in the p sub-shell. They are therefore 3 electrons shy of filling their valence shell in their non-ionized state. The Russell-Saunders term symbol of the ground state in all elements in the group is ^{4}S_{3/2}.

The most important elements of this group to life on Earth are nitrogen (N), which in its diatomic form is the principal component of air, and phosphorus (P), which, like nitrogen, is essential to all known forms of life.

==== Compounds ====
Binary compounds of the group can be referred to collectively as pnictides. Magnetic properties of pnictide compounds span the cases of diamagnetic systems (such as BN or GaN) and magnetically ordered systems (MnSb is paramagnetic at elevated temperatures and ferromagnetic at room temperature); the former compounds are usually transparent and the latter metallic. Other pnictides include the ternary rare-earth (RE) main-group variety of pnictides. These are in the form of RE_{a}M_{b}Pn_{c}, where M is a carbon group or boron group element and Pn is any pnictogen except nitrogen. These compounds are between ionic and covalent compounds and thus have unusual bonding properties.

These elements are also noted for their stability in compounds due to their tendency to form covalent double bonds and triple bonds. This property of these elements leads to their potential toxicity, most evident in phosphorus, arsenic, and antimony. When these substances react with various chemicals of the body, they create strong free radicals that are not easily processed by the liver, where they accumulate. Paradoxically, this same strong bonding causes nitrogen's and bismuth's reduced toxicity (when in molecules), because these strong bonds with other atoms are difficult to split, creating very unreactive molecules. For example, N_{2}, the diatomic form of nitrogen, is used as an inert gas in situations where using argon or another noble gas would be too expensive.

Formation of multiple bonds is facilitated by their five valence electrons whereas the octet rule permits a pnictogen for accepting three electrons on covalent bonding. Because 5 > 3, it leaves unused two electrons in a lone pair unless there is a positive charge around (like in [NH_{4}]^{+}). When a pnictogen forms only three single bonds, effects of the lone pair typically result in trigonal pyramidal molecular geometry.

==== Oxidation states ====
The light pnictogens (nitrogen, phosphorus, and arsenic) tend to form −3 charges when reduced, completing their octet. When oxidized or ionized, pnictogens typically take an oxidation state of +3 (by losing all three p-shell electrons in the valence shell) or +5 (by losing all three p-shell and both s-shell electrons in the valence shell). However heavier pnictogens are more likely to form the +3 oxidation state than lighter ones due to the s-shell electrons becoming more stabilized.

===== −3 oxidation state =====
Pnictogens can react with hydrogen to form pnictogen hydrides such as ammonia. Going down the group, to phosphane (phosphine), arsane (arsine), stibane (stibine), and finally bismuthane (bismuthine), each pnictogen hydride becomes progressively less stable (more unstable), more toxic, and has a smaller hydrogen-hydrogen angle (from 107.8° in ammonia to 90.48° in bismuthane). (Also, technically, only ammonia and phosphane have the pnictogen in the −3 oxidation state because, for the rest, the pnictogen is less electronegative than hydrogen.)

Crystal solids featuring pnictogens fully reduced include yttrium nitride, calcium phosphide, sodium arsenide, indium antimonide, and even double salts like aluminum gallium indium phosphide. These include III-V semiconductors, including gallium arsenide, the second-most widely used semiconductor after silicon.

===== +3 oxidation state =====
Nitrogen forms a limited number of stable III compounds. Nitrogen(III) oxide can only be isolated at low temperatures, and nitrous acid is unstable. Nitrogen trifluoride is the only stable nitrogen trihalide, with nitrogen trichloride, nitrogen tribromide, and nitrogen triiodide being explosive—nitrogen triiodide being so shock-sensitive that the touch of a feather detonates it (the last three actually feature nitrogen in the -3 oxidation state). Phosphorus forms a +III oxide which is stable at room temperature, phosphorous acid, and several trihalides, although the triiodide is unstable. Arsenic forms +III compounds with oxygen as arsenites, arsenous acid, and arsenic(III) oxide, and it forms all four trihalides. Antimony forms antimony(III) oxide and antimonite but not oxyacids. Its trihalides, antimony trifluoride, antimony trichloride, antimony tribromide, and antimony triiodide, like all pnictogen trihalides, each have trigonal pyramidal molecular geometry.

The +3 oxidation state is bismuth's most common oxidation state because its ability to form the +5 oxidation state is hindered by relativistic properties on heavier elements, effects that are even more pronounced concerning moscovium. Bismuth(III) forms an oxide, an oxychloride, an oxynitrate, and a sulfide. Moscovium(III) is predicted to behave similarly to bismuth(III). Moscovium is predicted to form all four trihalides, of which all but the trifluoride are predicted to be soluble in water. It is also predicted to form an oxychloride and oxybromide in the +III oxidation state.

===== +5 oxidation state =====
For nitrogen, the +5 state is typically serves as only a formal explanation of molecules like N_{2}O_{5}, as the high electronegativity of nitrogen causes the electrons to be shared almost evenly. Pnictogen compounds with coordination number 5 are hypervalent. Nitrogen(V) fluoride is only theoretical and has not been synthesized. The "true" +5 state is more common for the essentially non-relativistic typical pnictogens phosphorus, arsenic, and antimony, as shown in their oxides, phosphorus(V) oxide, arsenic(V) oxide, and antimony(V) oxide, and their fluorides, phosphorus(V) fluoride, arsenic(V) fluoride, antimony(V) fluoride. They also form related fluoride-anions, hexafluorophosphate, hexafluoroarsenate, hexafluoroantimonate, that function as non-coordinating anions. Phosphorus even forms mixed oxide-halides, known as oxyhalides, like phosphorus oxychloride, and mixed pentahalides, like phosphorus trifluorodichloride. Pentamethylpnictogen(V) compounds exist for arsenic, antimony, and bismuth. However, for bismuth, the +5 oxidation state becomes rare due to the relativistic stabilization of the 6s orbitals known as the inert-pair effect, so that the 6s electrons are reluctant to bond chemically. This causes bismuth(V) oxide to be unstable and bismuth(V) fluoride to be more reactive than the other pnictogen pentafluorides, making it an extremely powerful fluorinating agent. This effect is even more pronounced for moscovium, prohibiting it from attaining a +5 oxidation state.

===== Other oxidation states =====
- Nitrogen forms a variety of compounds with oxygen in which the nitrogen can take on a variety of oxidation states, including +II, +IV, and even some mixed-valence compounds and very unstable +VI oxidation state.
- In hydrazine, diphosphane, and organic derivatives of the two, the nitrogen or phosphorus atoms have the −2 oxidation state. Likewise, diimide, which has two nitrogen atoms double-bonded to each other, and its organic derivatives have nitrogen in the oxidation state of −1.
  - Similarly, realgar has arsenic–arsenic bonds, so the arsenic's oxidation state is +II.
  - A corresponding compound for antimony is Sb_{2}(C_{6}H_{5})_{4}, where the antimony's oxidation state is +II.
- Phosphorus has the +1 oxidation state in hypophosphorous acid and the +4 oxidation state in hypophosphoric acid.
- Antimony tetroxide is a mixed-valence compound, where half of the antimony atoms are in the +3 oxidation state, and the other half are in the +5 oxidation state.
- It is expected that moscovium will have an inert-pair effect for both the 7s and the 7p_{1/2} electrons, as the binding energy of the lone 7p_{3/2} electron is noticeably lower than that of the 7p_{1/2} electrons. This is predicted to cause +I to be a common oxidation state for moscovium, although it also occurs to a lesser extent for bismuth and nitrogen.

=== Physical ===
The pnictogens exemplify the transition from nonmetal to metal going down the periodic table: a gaseous diatomic nonmetal (N), two elements displaying many allotropes of varying conductivities and structures (P and As), and then at least two elements that only form metallic structures in bulk (Sb and Bi; probably Mc as well). All the elements in the group are solids at room temperature, except for nitrogen which is gaseous at room temperature. Nitrogen and bismuth, despite both being pnictogens, are very different in their physical properties. For instance, at STP nitrogen is a transparent non-metallic gas, while bismuth is a silvery-white metal.

The densities of the pnictogens increase towards the heavier pnictogens. Nitrogen's density is 0.001251 g/cm^{3} at STP. Phosphorus's density is 1.82 g/cm^{3} at STP, arsenic's is 5.72 g/cm^{3}, antimony's is 6.68 g/cm^{3}, and bismuth's is 9.79 g/cm^{3}.

Nitrogen's melting point is −210 °C and its boiling point is −196 °C. Phosphorus has a melting point of 44 °C and a boiling point of 280 °C. Arsenic is one of only two elements to sublimate at standard pressure; it does this at 603 °C. Antimony's melting point is 631 °C and its boiling point is 1587 °C. Bismuth's melting point is 271 °C and its boiling point is 1564 °C.

Nitrogen's crystal structure is hexagonal. Phosphorus's crystal structure is cubic. Arsenic, antimony, and bismuth all have rhombohedral crystal structures.

=== Nuclear ===
All pnictogens up to antimony have at least one stable isotope; bismuth has no stable isotopes, but has a primordial radioisotope with a half-life much longer than the age of the universe (^{209}Bi); and all known isotopes of moscovium are synthetic and highly radioactive. In addition to these isotopes, traces of ^{13}N, ^{32}P, and ^{33}P occur in nature, along with various bismuth isotopes (other than ^{209}Bi) in the decay chains of thorium and uranium.

== History ==
The nitrogen compound sal ammoniac (ammonium chloride) has been known since the time of the Ancient Egyptians. In the 1760s two scientists, Henry Cavendish and Joseph Priestley, isolated nitrogen from air, but neither realized the presence of an undiscovered element. It was not until several years later, in 1772, that Daniel Rutherford realized that the gas was indeed nitrogen.

The alchemist Hennig Brandt first discovered phosphorus in Hamburg in 1669. Brandt produced the element by heating evaporated urine and condensing the resulting phosphorus vapor in water. Brandt initially thought that he had discovered the Philosopher's Stone, but eventually realized that this was not the case.

Arsenic compounds have been known for at least 5000 years, and the ancient Greek Theophrastus recognized the arsenic minerals called realgar and orpiment. Elemental arsenic was discovered in the 13th century by Albertus Magnus.

Antimony was well known to the ancients. A 5000-year-old vase made of nearly pure antimony exists in the Louvre. Antimony compounds were used in dyes in the Babylonian times. The antimony mineral stibnite may have been a component of Greek fire.

Bismuth was first discovered by an alchemist in 1400. Within 80 years of bismuth's discovery, it had applications in printing and decorated caskets. The Incas were also using bismuth in knives by 1500. Bismuth was originally thought to be the same as lead, but in 1753, Claude François Geoffroy proved that bismuth was different from lead.

Moscovium was successfully produced in 2003 by bombarding americium-243 atoms with calcium-48 atoms.

=== Names and etymology ===
The term "pnictogen" (or "pnigogen") is derived from the Ancient Greek word πνίγειν (pnígein) meaning "to choke", referring to the choking or stifling property of nitrogen gas. It can also be used as a mnemonic for the two most common members, P and N. The term "pnictogen" was suggested by the Dutch chemist Anton Eduard van Arkel in the early 1950s. It is also spelled "pnicogen" or "pnigogen". The term "pnicogen" is rarer than the term "pnictogen", and the ratio of academic research papers using "pnictogen" to those using "pnicogen" is 2.5 to 1. It comes from the Greek root πνιγ- (choke, strangle), and thus the word "pnictogen" is also a reference to the Dutch and German names for nitrogen (stikstof and Stickstoff, respectively, "suffocating substance": i.e., substance in air, unsupportive of breathing). Hence, "pnictogen" could be translated as "suffocation maker". The word "pnictide" also comes from the same root.

The name pentels (from Greek πέντε, pénte, five) also at one time stood for this group.

== Occurrence ==
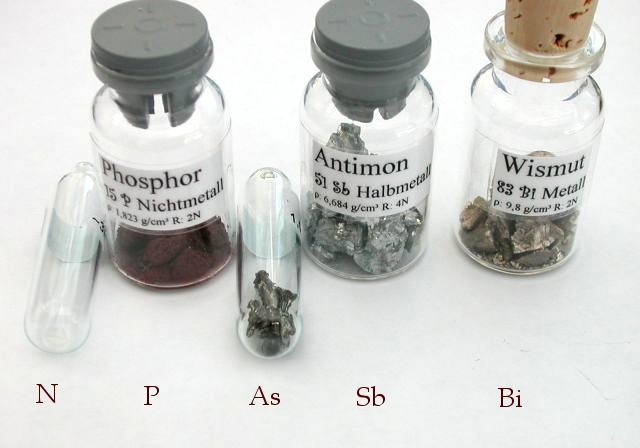
A collection of pnictogen samples

Nitrogen makes up 25 parts per million of the Earth's crust, 5 parts per million of soil on average, 100 to 500 parts per trillion of seawater, and 78% of dry air. Most nitrogen on Earth is in nitrogen gas, but some nitrate minerals exist. Nitrogen makes up 2.5% of a typical human by weight.

Phosphorus is 0.1% of the earth's crust, making it the 11th most abundant element. Phosphorus comprises 0.65 parts per million of soil and 15 to 60 parts per billion of seawater. There are 200 Mt of accessible phosphates on earth. Phosphorus makes up 1.1% of a typical human by weight. Phosphorus occurs in minerals of the apatite family, which are the main components of the phosphate rocks.

Arsenic constitutes 1.5 parts per million of the Earth's crust, making it the 53rd most abundant element. The soils hold 1 to 10 parts per million of arsenic, and seawater carries 1.6 parts per billion of arsenic. Arsenic comprises 100 parts per billion of a typical human by weight. Some arsenic exists in elemental form, but most arsenic is found in the arsenic minerals orpiment, realgar, arsenopyrite, and enargite.

Antimony makes up 0.2 parts per million of the earth's crust, making it the 63rd most abundant element. The soils contain 1 part per million of antimony on average, and seawater contains 300 parts per trillion on average. A typical human has 28 parts per billion of antimony by weight. Some elemental antimony occurs in silver deposits.

Bismuth makes up 48 parts per billion of the earth's crust, making it the 70th most abundant element. The soils contain approximately 0.25 parts per million of bismuth, and seawater contains 400 parts per trillion of bismuth. Bismuth most commonly occurs as the mineral bismuthinite, but bismuth also occurs in elemental form or sulfide ores.

Moscovium is produced several atoms at a time in particle accelerators.

== Production ==
=== Nitrogen ===
Nitrogen can be produced by fractional distillation of air.

=== Phosphorus ===
The principal method for producing phosphorus is to reduce phosphates with carbon in an electric arc furnace.

=== Arsenic ===
Most arsenic is prepared by heating the mineral arsenopyrite in the presence of air. This forms As_{4}O_{6}, from which arsenic can be extracted via carbon reduction. However, it is also possible to make metallic arsenic by heating arsenopyrite at 650 to 700 °C without oxygen.

=== Antimony ===
With sulfide ores, the method by which antimony is produced depends on the amount of antimony in the raw ore. If the ore contains 25% to 45% antimony by weight, then crude antimony is produced by smelting the ore in a blast furnace. If the ore contains 45% to 60% antimony by weight, antimony is obtained by heating the ore, also known as liquidation. Ores with more than 60% antimony by weight are chemically displaced with iron shavings from the molten ore, resulting in impure metal.

If an oxide ore of antimony contains less than 30% antimony by weight, the ore is reduced in a blast furnace. If the ore contains closer to 50% antimony by weight, the ore is instead reduced in a reverberatory furnace.

Antimony ores with mixed sulfides and oxides are smelted in a blast furnace.

=== Bismuth ===
Bismuth minerals do occur, in particular in the form of sulfides and oxides, but it is more economic to produce bismuth as a by-product of the smelting of lead ores or, as in China, of tungsten and zinc ores.

=== Moscovium ===
Moscovium is produced a few atoms at a time in particle accelerators by firing a beam of calcium-48 ions at americium-243 until the nuclei fuse.

== Applications ==
- Liquid nitrogen is a commonly used cryogenic liquid.
- Nitrogen in the form of ammonia is a nutrient critical to most plants' survival. Synthesis of ammonia accounts for about 1–2% of the world's energy consumption and the majority of reduced nitrogen in food.
- Phosphorus is used in matches and incendiary bombs.
- Phosphate fertilizer helps feed much of the world.
- Arsenic was historically used as a Paris green pigment, but is not used this way anymore due to its extreme toxicity.
- Arsenic in the form of organoarsenic compounds is sometimes used in chicken feed.
- Antimony is alloyed with lead to produce some bullets.
- Antimony currency was briefly used in the 1930s in parts of China, but this use was discontinued as antimony is both soft and toxic.
- Bismuth subsalicylate is the active ingredient in Pepto-Bismol.
- Bismuth chalcogenides are being studied in cancerous mice as a candidate for use in improving radiation therapy in human cancer patients.
- Moscovium is too unstable and scarce to have any known practical application.

== Biological role ==
Nitrogen is a component of molecules critical to life on earth, such as DNA and amino acids. Nitrates occur in some plants, due to bacteria present in the nodes of the plant. This is seen in leguminous plants such as peas or spinach and lettuce. A typical 70 kg (150 lb) human contains 1.8 kg of nitrogen.

Phosphorus in the form of phosphates occur in compounds important to life, such as DNA and ATP. Humans consume approximately 1 g of phosphorus per day. Phosphorus is found in foods such as fish, liver, turkey, chicken, and eggs. Phosphate deficiency is a problem known as hypophosphatemia. A typical 70 kg human contains 480 g of phosphorus.

Arsenic promotes growth in chickens and rats, and may be essential for humans in small quantities. Arsenic has been shown to be helpful in metabolizing the amino acid arginine. There are 7 mg of arsenic in a typical 70 kg human.

Antimony is not known to have a biological role. Plants take up only trace amounts of antimony. There are approximately 2 mg of antimony in a typical 70 kg human.

Bismuth is not known to have a biological role. Humans ingest on average less than 20 μg of bismuth per day. There is less than 500 μg of bismuth in a typical 70 kg human.

Moscovium is too unstable to occur in nature or have a known biological role. Moscovium does not typically occur in organisms in any meaningful amount.

=== Toxicity ===
Nitrogen gas is completely non-toxic, but breathing in pure nitrogen gas is deadly, because it causes nitrogen asphyxiation. The build-up of nitrogen bubbles in the blood, such as those that may occur during scuba diving, can cause a condition known as the "bends" (decompression sickness). Many nitrogen compounds such as hydrogen cyanide and nitrogen-based explosives are also highly dangerous.

White phosphorus, an allotrope of phosphorus, is toxic, with 1 mg per kg bodyweight being a lethal dose. White phosphorus usually kills humans within a week of ingestion by attacking the liver. Breathing in phosphorus in its gaseous form can cause an industrial disease called "phossy jaw", which eats away at the jawbone. White phosphorus is also highly flammable. Some organophosphorus compounds can fatally block certain enzymes in the human body.

Elemental arsenic is toxic, as are many of its inorganic compounds; however some of its organic compounds can promote growth in chickens. The lethal dose of arsenic for a typical adult is 200 mg and can cause diarrhea, vomiting, colic, dehydration, and coma. Death from arsenic poisoning typically occurs within a day.

Antimony is mildly toxic. Additionally, wine steeped in antimony containers can induce vomiting. When taken in large doses, antimony causes vomiting in a victim, who then appears to recover before dying several days later. Antimony attaches itself to certain enzymes and is difficult to dislodge. Stibine, or SbH_{3}, is far more toxic than pure antimony.

Bismuth itself is largely non-toxic, although consuming too much of it can damage the liver. Only one person has ever been reported to have died from bismuth poisoning. However, consumption of soluble bismuth salts can turn a person's gums black.

Moscovium is too unstable to conduct any toxicity chemistry.

== See also ==
- Oxypnictide, including superconductors discovered in 2008
- Iron-based superconductor, ferropnictide and oxypnictide superconductors
