= Dichlorotrimethyltantalum =

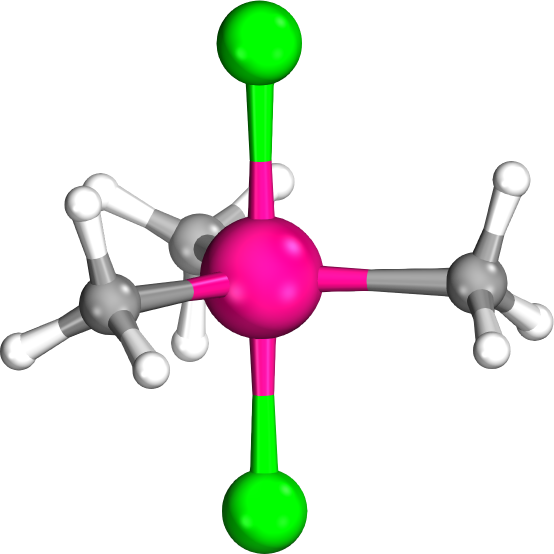
- Crystal structure

Identifiers
3D model (JSmol)	Interactive image
- InChI: InChI=1S/3CH3.2ClH.Ta/h3*1H3;2*1H;/q;;;;;+2/p-2 Key: WVEZGSYFQFUDAE-UHFFFAOYSA-L
- SMILES: Cl[Ta](Cl)(C)(C)C

Properties
Chemical formula	TaCl_{2}(CH_{3})_{3}
Molar mass	293.935 g/mol
Appearance	pale yellow crystals
- Except where otherwise noted, data are given for materials in their standard state (at 25 °C [77 °F], 100 kPa). Infobox references

Dichlorotrimethyltantalum, or trimethyltantalum dichloride, is an organotantalum complex with the molecular formula TaCl_{2}(CH_{3})_{3}. It forms pale yellow, highly air- and water-sensitive crystals which easily sublime in vacuum at room temperature. It was the first reported σ-bonded alkyl complex of tantalum, synthesised by Gordon L. Juvinall at the California Institute of Technology in 1964. It serves as an important precursor for the preparation of a large number of Ta(V) complexes.

== Structure ==
Dichlorotrimethyltantalum adopts an approximately trigonal bipyramidal structure, with D_{3h} symmetry at Ta. The two more electronegative chlorine ligands bind at the axial positions, with a Ta-Cl bond length of 2.317 Å in the gas phase, and 2.312 Å in the solid state. The methyl groups bind in the equatorial plane, with a Ta-C bond length of 2.158 Å in the gas phase, and 2.117 Å in the solid state.

Due to statistical disorder, the C-Ta-Cl angles have been calculated by Density Functional Theory to be 88° and 92°, rather than the idealised 90°. It crystallises in the space group P6_{3}/mmc, with tantalum residing on a -6m2 site.

== Synthesis ==
Dichlorotrimethyltantalum can be synthesised by reacting sublimed tantalum(V) chloride with dimethyl zinc in pentane at 25°C for 6 hours, followed by the filtration of zinc chloride.

TaCl_{5} + 1.5 Zn(CH_{3})_{2} → TaCl_{2}(CH_{3})_{3} + 1.5 ZnCl_{2}

== Physical properties and stability ==
Dichlorotrimethyltantalum was first reported by Juvinall to form pale yellow crystals, more thermally unstable relative to its niobium analogue (dichlorotrimethylniobium). Initial attempts to characterise it by proton Nuclear Magnetic Resonance spectroscopy failed due to its instability in carbon tetrachloride at -10°C. It is highly volatile, and releases methane readily at room temperature; it is additionally highly air- and water-sensitive.

These properties have rendered dichlorotrimethyltantalum challenging to characterise beyond gas phase electron diffraction studies and DFT modelling, though conditions for growing crystals suitable for X-ray diffraction (in solution in pentane at -15°C) have recently been reported by Sattler.

== Reactivity ==
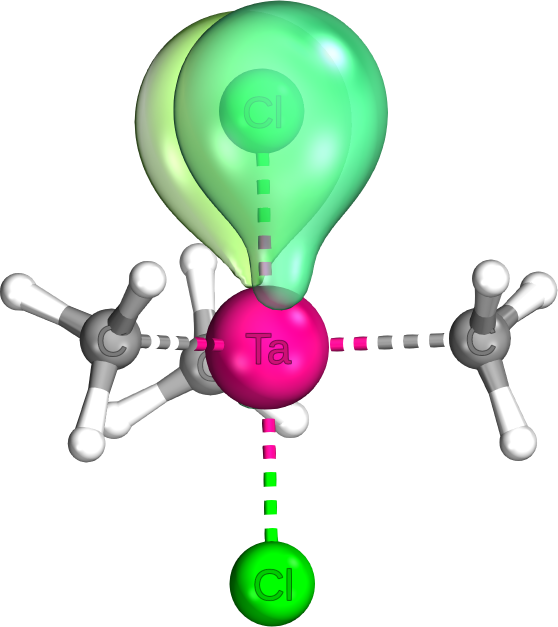
The quadruply degenerate HOMO of TaCl_{2}Me_{3}: a Ta-Cl pi bond. Kohn-Sham method (DFJX-RKS) with PBE functional and def2-TZVP basis. Image generated from IBOView

Dichlorotrimethyltantalum is a pentacoordinated Ta(V) complex with ten valence electrons, making it coordinatively and electronically unsaturated. The quadruply degenerate Highest Occupied Molecular Orbital of dichlorotrimethyltantalum is calculated to be a Ta-Cl pi bond, alleviating some of this electron deficiency.

=== Lewis base coordination ===
Due to its electrophilicity, dichlorotrimethyltantalum is known to form adducts with Lewis bases. Drew reported in 1973 the addition of a bidentate 2,2'-bipyridine ligand to dichlorotrimethyltantalum, resulting in a seven-coordinate complex 2,2'-Bipyridyldichloro(trimethyl)-tantalum(V), whose geometry is described as a "distorted capped trigonal prism".

Monodentate Lewis base adduction to dichlorotrimethyltantalum has also been reported with trimethylphosphine by Sattler. Trimethylphosphine was introduced by vapour transfer to dichlorotrimethyltantalum frozen in a liquid nitrogen bath, resulting in the seven-coordinate bisphosphine complex. The complex, like 2,2'-Bipyridyldichloro(trimethyl)-tantalum(V), resembles a capped trigonal prism, but with a trimethylphosphine ligand capping instead of a chloride.

=== Chloride substitution ===
Pentamethyltantalum, which adopts a square pyramidal geometry, can be synthesised by the addition of two equivalents of methyllithium to dichlorotrimethyltantalum at -78°C.

In addition, dichlorotrimethyltantalum can undergo a salt exchange metathesis to substitute its chloride ligands for oxygen-bound enolates. In an attempt to stabilise low-coordinate early transition metal complexes, Cummins designed a robust enolate ligand featuring flat aryl ring and adamantylidene cage subtitutents, subsequently ligating it to dichlorotrimethyltantalum via its potassium salt. The resulting compound retained its trigonal bipyramidal geometry, featuring axial O-bound enolates in place of axial chlorides - and was further shown to be active for dehydrogenative pyridine C-C coupling in the presence of pyridine and hydrogen, forming the bipyridyl complex.

A wide variety of chelate complexes can be synthesised from the dichlorotrimethyltantalum precursor. β-diketones like acetylacetone and hexafluoroacetylacetone coordinate as bidentate ligands, forming geometrically non-rigid seven-coordinate complexes. With the addition of squarate or perchlorate, the tantalum complex dimerises in acetonitrile, with their respective chelating ligands bridging the Ta centres. These seven-coordinate complexes of the form TaMe_{3}L_{2}, where L is a bidentate monoanion, are markedly more thermally stable than their precursor, decomposing in the range 80–120 °C.
