= Pentamethylantimony =

Names
- Systematic IUPAC name pentamethyl-λ^{5}-stibane

Identifiers
CAS Number	15120-50-0
3D model (JSmol)	Interactive image
ChemSpider	109956
EC Number	239-173-4239-173-4
PubChem CID	123354
CompTox Dashboard (EPA)	DTXSID60164733
- InChI: InChI=1S/5CH3.Sb/h5*1H3; Key: BBEVMUOEYNOTTE-UHFFFAOYSA-N
- SMILES: C[Sb](C)(C)(C)C

Properties
Chemical formula	C_{5}H_{15}Sb
Molar mass	196.935 g·mol^{−1}
Appearance	Colourless liquid
Melting point	−19 °C (−2 °F; 254 K)
Boiling point	160 °C (320 °F; 433 K)

Structure
Molecular shape	Trigonal bipyramidal at Sb

Related compounds
Related compounds	Trimethylstibine; Pentamethylarsenic; Pentamethylbismuth; Pentamethyltantalum; Pentaphenylantimony
- Except where otherwise noted, data are given for materials in their standard state (at 25 °C [77 °F], 100 kPa). (what is ?) Infobox references

Pentamethylantimony or pentamethylstiborane is an organoantimony compound containing five methyl groups bound to an antimony atom with formula Sb(CH_{3})_{5}. It is an example of a hypervalent compound. The molecular shape is trigonal bipyramidal. Some other antimony(V) organometallic compounds include pentapropynylantimony (Sb(C≡C−CH_{3})_{5}) and pentaphenyl antimony (Sb(C_{6}H_{5})_{5}). Other known pentamethyl-pnictides include pentamethylbismuth and pentamethylarsenic.

== Production ==
Pentamethylantimony can be made by reacting Sb(CH_{3})_{3}Br_{2} with two equivalents of methyl lithium. Another production route is to convert trimethylstibine to the trimethyl antimony dichloride, and then replace the chlorine with methyl groups with methyl lithium.

Sb(CH_{3})_{3} + Cl_{2} → Sb(CH_{3})_{3}Cl_{2}
Sb(CH_{3})_{3}Cl_{2} + 2 LiCH_{3} → Sb(CH_{3})_{5} + 2 LiCl

== Properties ==
Pentamethylantimony is colourless. At -143 °C it crystallizes in the orthorhombic system with space group Ccmm. Unit cell dimensions are a=6.630 Å b=11.004 Å c=11.090 Å. There are four formula per unit cell. Unit cell volume is 809.1 Å^{3}. The trigonal bipyramid shape has three equatorial positions for carbon, and two axial positions at the peaks of the pyramids. The length of the antimony-carbon bond is around 214 pm for equatorial methyl groups and 222 pm for the axial positions. The bond angles are 120° for ∠C-Sb-C across the equator, and 90° for ∠C-Sb-C between equator and axis. The molecules rapidly change carbon atom position, so that in NMR spectrum as low as −100 °C, there is only one kind of hydrogen position.

Pentamethylantimony is more stable than pentamethylbismuth, because in lower energy trimethylbismuth, the non-bonding pair of electrons is more shielded due to the f-electrons and the lanthanoid contraction. Trimethylantimony is higher in energy, and thus less is released in a decomposition of pentamethylantimony. Pentamethylantimony can be stored as a liquid in clean glass at room temperature.

Pentamethylantimony melts at -19 °C. Although it decomposes when boiling is attempted and can explode, it has a high vapour pressure at 8 mmHg at 25 °C.

There are two absorption bands in the ultraviolet at 2380 and 2500 Å.

== Reactions ==
Pentamethylantimony reacts with methyl lithium to yield a colourless lithium hexamethylantimonate in tetrahydrofuran.

Sb(CH_{3})_{5} + LiCH_{3} → Li(thf)Sb(CH_{3})_{6}

Pentamethylantimony reacts with silsesquioxanes to yield tetramethylstibonium silsesquioxanes. eg (cyclo-C_{6}H_{11})_{7}Si_{7}O_{9}(OH)_{3} yields (cyclo-C_{6}H_{11})_{7}Si_{7}O_{9}(OSb(CH_{3})_{4})_{3}. The reaction happens quickly when there are more than two OH groups.

Phosphonic acids and phosphinic acids combine with pentamethylantimony to yield compounds like (CH_{3})_{4}SbOP(O)Ph_{2}, (CH_{3})_{4}SbOP(O)(OH)Ph and (CH_{3})_{4}SbOP(O)(OH)_{3}, eliminating methane.

Stannocene Sn(C_{5}H_{5})_{2} combines with pentamethylantimony to produce bis(tetramethylstibonium)tetracyclopentadienylstannate ([(CH_{3})_{4}Sb]_{2}Sn(C_{5}H_{5})_{4}).

Pentamethylantimony reacts with many very weak acids to form a tetramethylstibonium salt or tetramethylstibonium derivative with the acid. Such acids include water (H_{2}O), alcohols, thiols, phenol, carboxylic acids, hydrogen fluoride, thiocyanic acid, hydrazoic acid, difluorophosphoric acid, thiophosphinic acids, and alkylsilols.

With halogens, pentamethylantimony has one or two methyl groups replaced by the halogen atoms. Lewis acids also react to form tetramethyl stibonium salts, including [(CH_{3})_{4}Sb]TlBr_{4}, [(CH_{3})_{4}Sb][CH_{3}SbCl_{5}],

Pentamethylantimony reacts with the surface of silica to coat it with Si-O-Sb(CH_{3})_{4} groups. Over 250 °C this decomposes to Sb(CH_{3}) and leaves methyl groups attached to the silica surface.
