= Crystallographic disorder =

Presence of isomers with identical centers of mass in a crystal

In X-ray crystallography, crystallographic disorder describes the existence of variable geometries within a crystal. In some cases, disorder can be described as cocrystallization.

== Inorganic cases ==
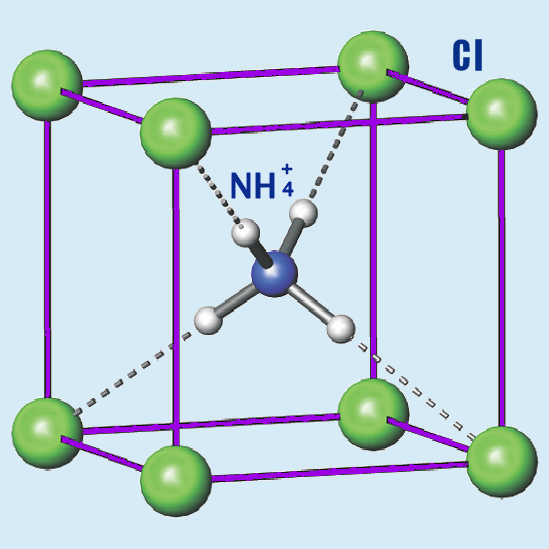
unit cell of a common form of solid ammonium chloride

Disorder is pervasive in inorganic solids. Here are a few cases:

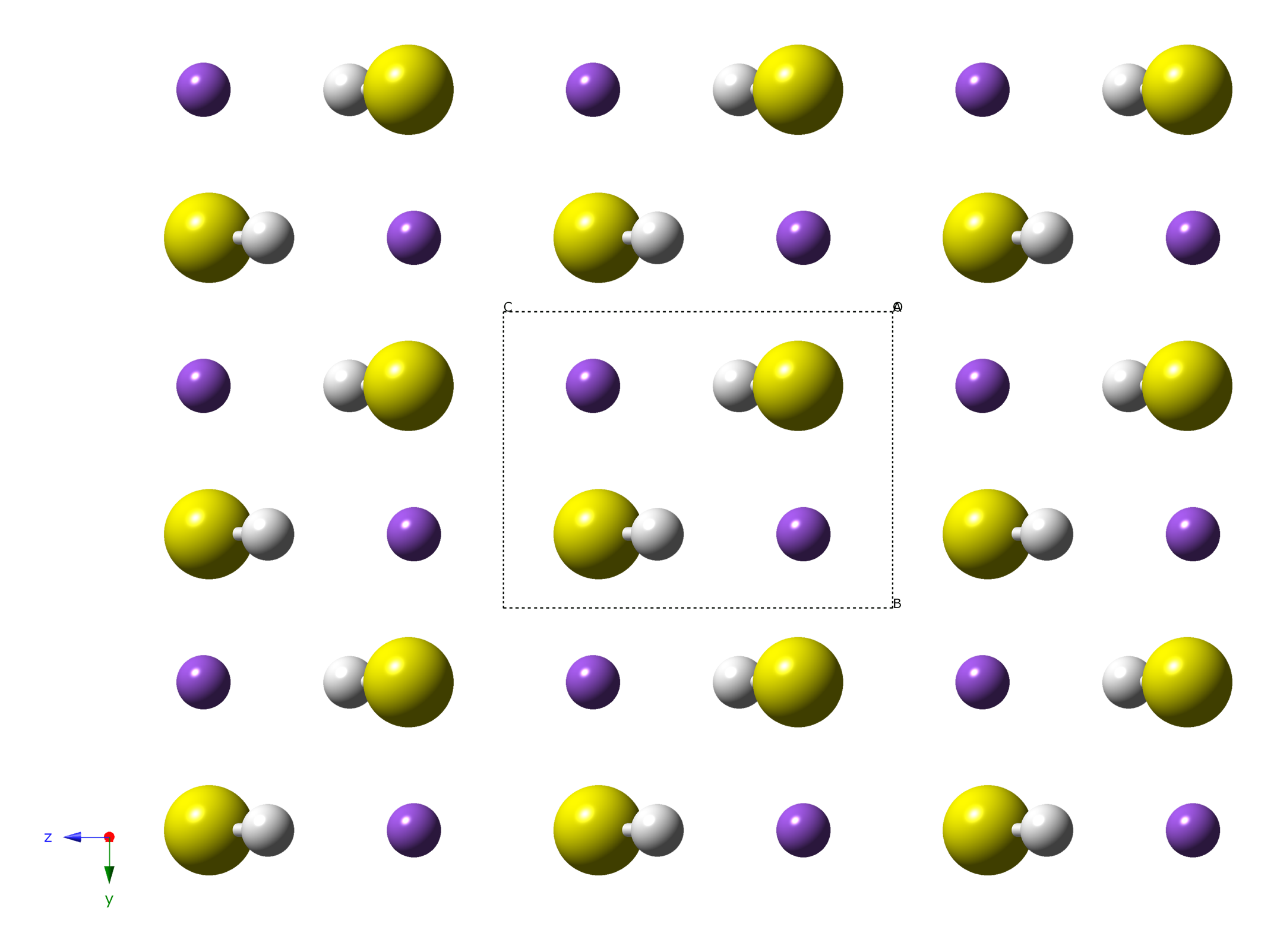
Atomic structure of crystalline NaSH according to X-ray crystallography. Color code: violet = Na, yellow = S, white = H.

At temperatures above 360 K, NaSH adopts the NaCl structure, which implies that the HS^{−} behaves as a spherical anion owing to its rapid rotation, leading to equal occupancy of eight equivalent positions. Below 360 K, a rhombohedral structure forms, and the HS^{−} sweeps out a discoidal shape. Below 114 K, the structure becomes monoclinic. The analogous rubidium and potassium compounds behave similarly.

For ammonium chloride (NH_{4}Cl), according to X-ray crystallography, two phases are disordered variants of the sodium chloride and cesium chloride structures.

Solid potassium cyanide (KCN) has structure resembling sodium chloride: with each potassium ion surrounded by six cyanide ions, and vice versa. Despite being diatomic, and thus less symmetric than chloride, the cyanide ions rotate so rapidly that their time-averaged shape is spherical. At low temperature and high pressure, this free rotation is hindered, resulting in a less symmetric crystal structure with the cyanide ions arranged in sheets.

== Molecular cases ==
Disorder is common for molecules where more than one rotamer, conformer, or isomer where the center of mass of each form is identical or unresolvable. Due to disorder, the crystallographic solution is the sum of the various forms. In many cases, the components of the disorder are equally abundant, and, in other cases, the weighting coefficients for each component differ. Disorder can entail a pair or several components, and usually arises when the forms are nearly equal in energy and the crystal lattice is sufficiently spacious to accommodate the various components.

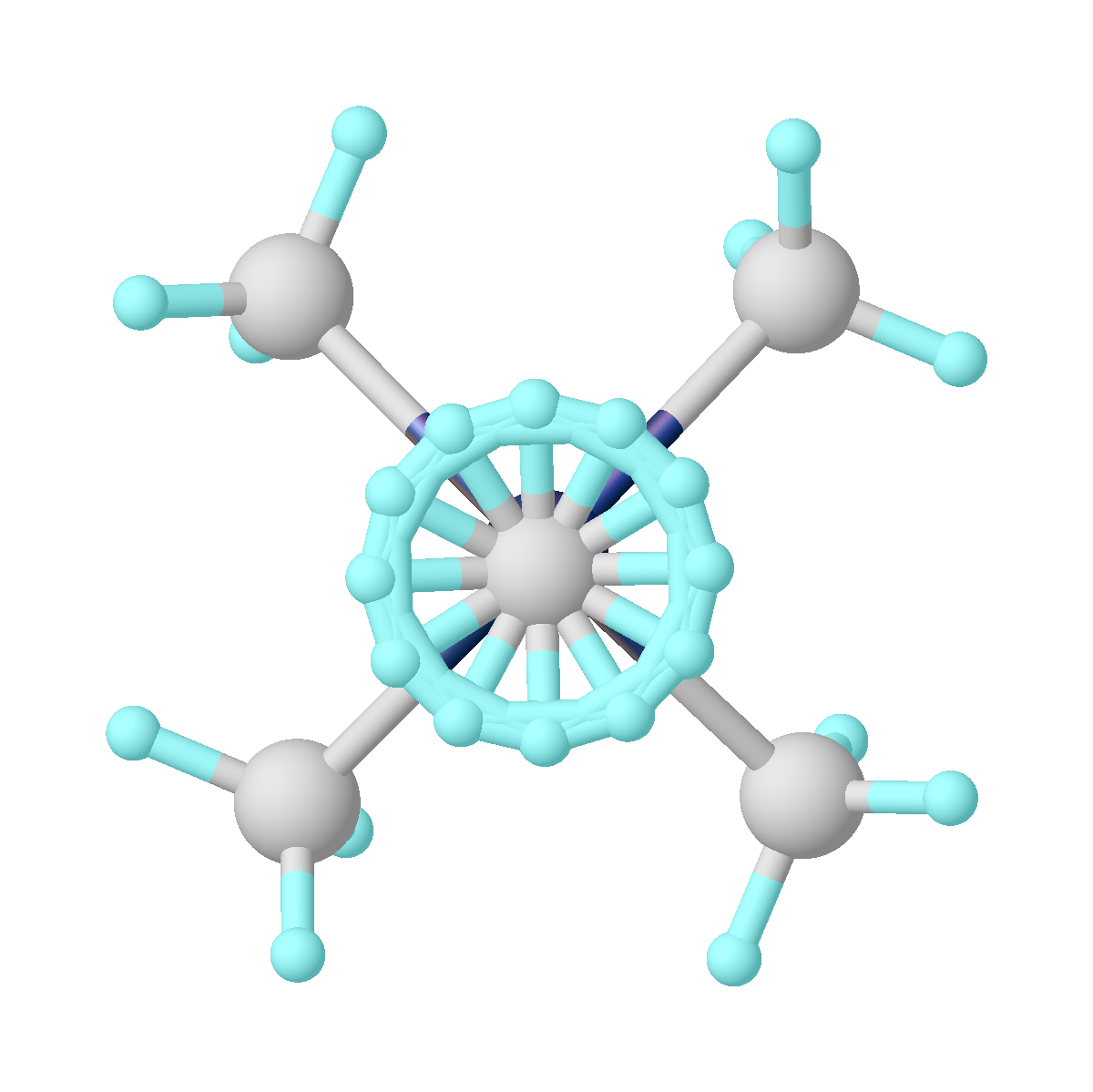
Structure of pentamethylmolybdenum, Mo(CH_{3})_{5}, showing 4-fold disorder of one methyl group.

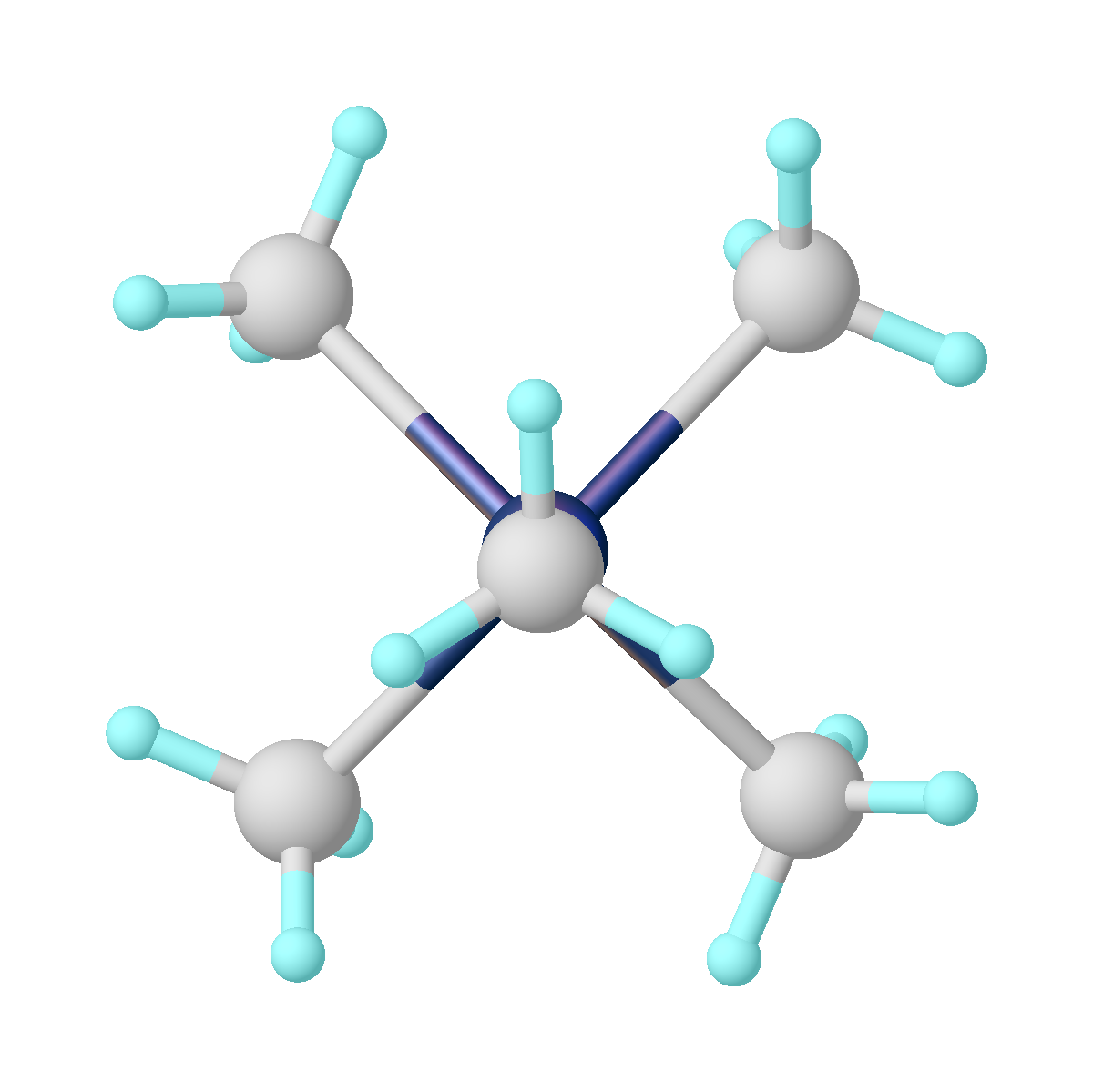
One of four rotamers of Mo(CH_{3})_{5}.
