= Pentamethylbismuth =

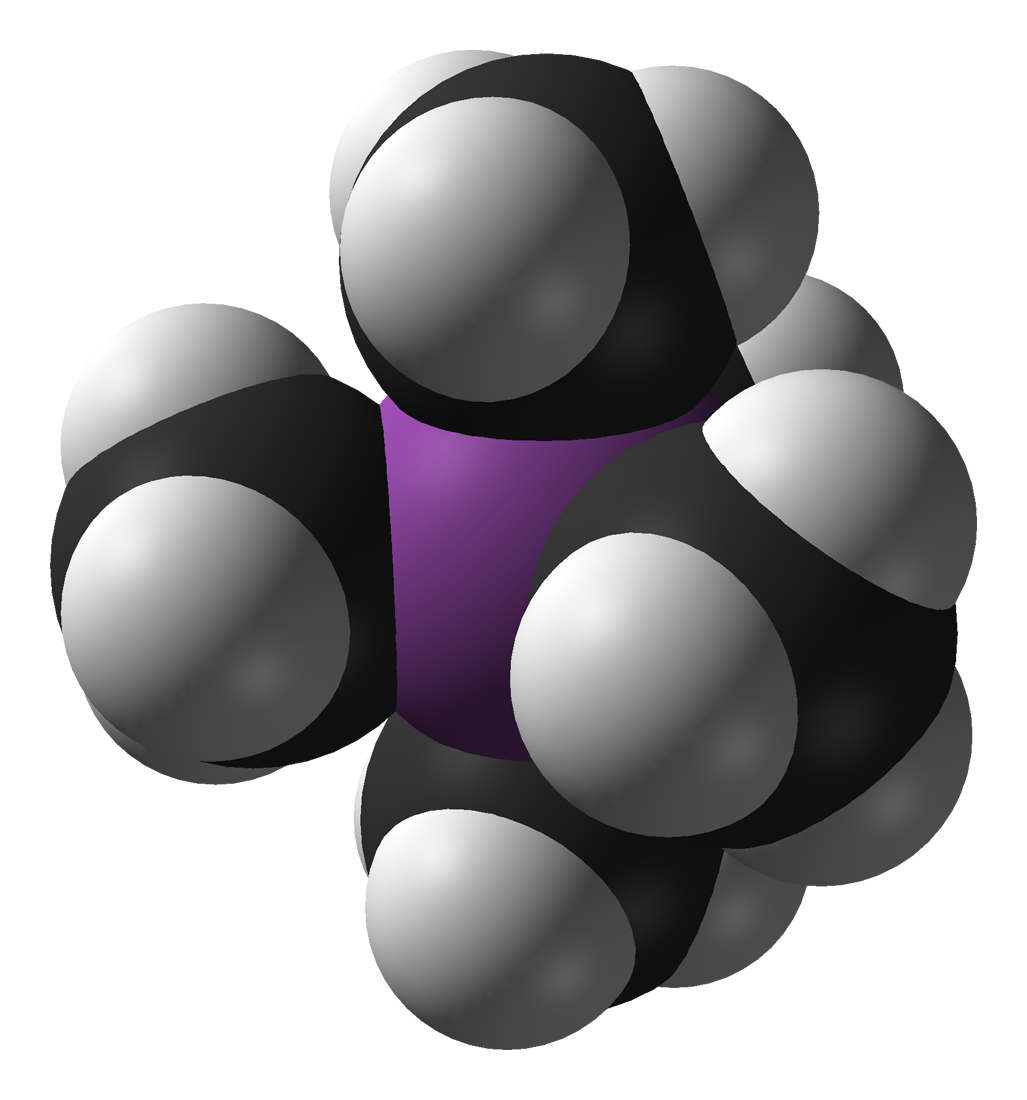

Names
- Preferred IUPAC name Pentamethyl-λ^{5}-bismuthane

Identifiers
CAS Number	148739-67-7
3D model (JSmol)	Interactive image
PubChem CID	21933141
UNII	MYP8RT4JE2
- InChI: InChI=1S/5CH3.Bi/h5*1H3; Key: ARMZEJAYUBQCRQ-UHFFFAOYSA-N
- SMILES: C[Bi](C)(C)(C)C

Properties
Chemical formula	C_{5}H_{15}Bi
Molar mass	284.155 g·mol^{−1}
Appearance	blue-violet solid

Related compounds
Related compounds	Trimethylbismuth; Pentamethylarsenic; Pentamethylantimony; Pentamethyltantalum; Pentaphenylbismuth
- Except where otherwise noted, data are given for materials in their standard state (at 25 °C [77 °F], 100 kPa). (what is ?) Infobox references

Pentamethylbismuth (or pentamethylbismuthorane) is an organometalllic compound containing five methyl groups bound to a bismuth atom with formula Bi(CH_{3})_{5}. It is an example of a hypervalent compound. The molecular shape is trigonal bipyramid.

== Production ==
Pentamethylbismuth is produced in a two step process. First, trimethylbismuth is reacted with sulfuryl chloride to yield dichloro trimethylbismuth, which is then reacted with two equivalents of methyllithium dissolved in ether. The blue solution is cooled to −110 °C to precipitate the solid product.

Bi(CH_{3})_{3} + SO_{2}Cl_{2} → Bi(CH_{3})_{3}Cl_{2} + SO_{2}
Bi(CH_{3})_{3}Cl_{2} + 2LiCH_{3} → Bi(CH_{3})_{5} + 2LiCl

== Properties ==
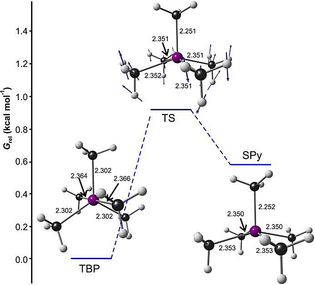
energy levels and shapes of pentamethylbismuth molecules

At -110 °C, Bi(CH_{3})_{5} is a blue-violet solid. The methyl groups are arranged in a trigonal bipyramid, and the bond-lengths of methyl with bismuth are all the same. However, the molecule is not rigid, as can be determined from the nuclear magnetic resonance spectrum that shows all methyl groups are equivalent. It is stable as a solid, but in the gas phase, when heated or in solution decomposes to trimethylbismuth. The colour is unusual for bismuth or other hypervalent pnictide compounds, which are colourless. Calculations show that the colour is due to HOMO-LUMO transition. The HOMO is ligand based, whereas the LUMO is modified by relativistically stabilised bismuth 6s orbitals.

== Reactions ==
If excess methyllithium is used in production, an orange hexamethylbismuth salt, LiBi(CH_{3})_{6}, is formed.

== Extra reading ==
- Gagnon, Alexandre; Dansereau, Julien; Le Roch, Adrien (2 March 2017). "Organobismuth Reagents: Synthesis, Properties and Applications in Organic Synthesis". Synthesis. 49 (8): 1707–1745. doi:10.1055/s-0036-1589482. S2CID 102471505.
