= Pentamethyltantalum =

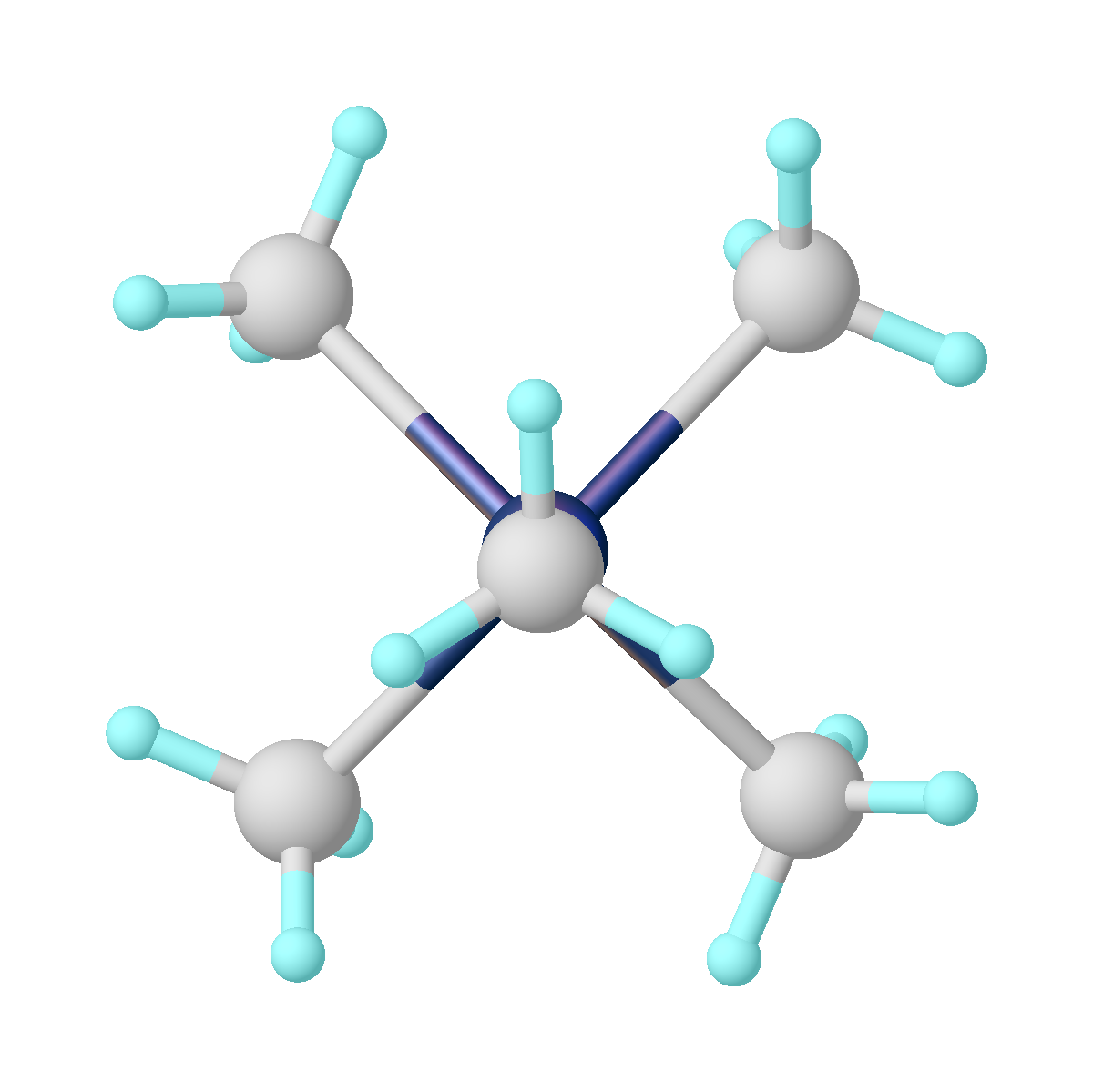

Names
- Systematic IUPAC name pentamethyl-λ^{5}-tantalane

Identifiers
CAS Number	53378-72-6
3D model (JSmol)	Interactive image
PubChem CID	143042
CompTox Dashboard (EPA)	DTXSID90968024
- InChI: InChI=1S/5CH3.Ta/h5*1H3;/q5*-1;+5 Key: GFPNFSSWCUULLCP-UHFFFAOYSA-N
- SMILES: C[Ta](C)(C)(C)C

Properties
Chemical formula	C_{5}H_{15}Ta
Molar mass	256.123 g·mol^{−1}
Appearance	yellow oil, green solid at −20°
Melting point	0 °C (32 °F; 273 K)
Solubility	diethylether, pentane, 2-methylbutane

Thermochemistry
Std enthalpy of formation (Δ_{f}H^{⦵}_{298})	169.8 213 kJ/mol

Related compounds
Related compounds	Pentamethylarsenic; Pentamethylbismuth; Pentamethylantimony
- Except where otherwise noted, data are given for materials in their standard state (at 25 °C [77 °F], 100 kPa). (what is ?) Infobox references

Pentamethyltantalum is a homoleptic organotantalum compound. It has a propensity to explode when it is melted. Its discovery was part of a sequence that led to Richard R. Schrock's Nobel Prize winning discovery in olefin metathesis.

== Production ==
Pentamethyltantalum can be made from the reaction of methyllithium with dichlorotrimethyltantalum. Ta(CH_{3})_{3}Cl_{2} is in turn made from tantalum pentachloride and dimethylzinc.

The preparation was inspired by the existence of pentaphenylphosphorus, and the discovery of hexamethyltungsten. The discoverer Richard R. Schrock considered tantalum to be a metallic phosphorus, and thus tried the use of methyllithium.

== Properties ==
The pentamethyltantalum adopts a square pyramid shape. Ignoring the C-H bonds, the molecule has C_{4v} symmetry. The four carbon atoms at the base of the pyramid are called basal, and the carbon atom at the top is called apical or apex. The distance from tantalum to the apical carbon atom is 2.11 Å, and to the basal carbon atoms is 2.180 Å. The distance from hydrogen to carbon in the methyl groups is 1.106 Å. The angle subtended by two basal carbon bonds is 82.2°, and the angle between the bonds to the apex and a carbon on the base is about 111.7°.

At room temperature, pentamethyltantalum can spontaneously explode, so samples are usually stored in a −20 °C freezer.

== Reactions ==
With many carbon-hydrogen bonds near Ta, analogues of pentamethyltantalum are susceptible to alpha elimination.

Excess methyllithium reacts to yield higher coordinated methyl tantalum ions [Ta(CH_{3})_{6}]^{−} and [Ta(CH_{3})_{7}]^{2−}.

Pentamethyltantalum in solution forms stable insoluble complex material when mixed with dmpe (CH_{3})_{2}PCH_{2}CH_{2}P(CH_{3})_{2}.

With nitric oxide it gives a white coloured dimer with formula {TaMe_{3}[ON(Me)NO]_{2}}_{2} (Me=CH_{3}).
