= Trimethylarsine =

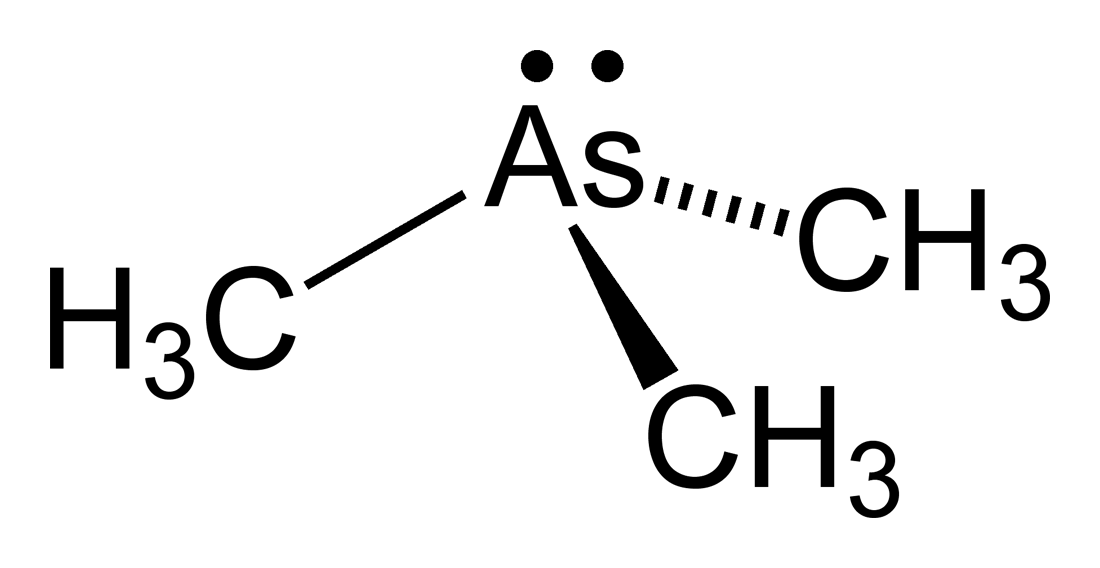
- Structural formula of trimethylarsine with an implicit electron pair

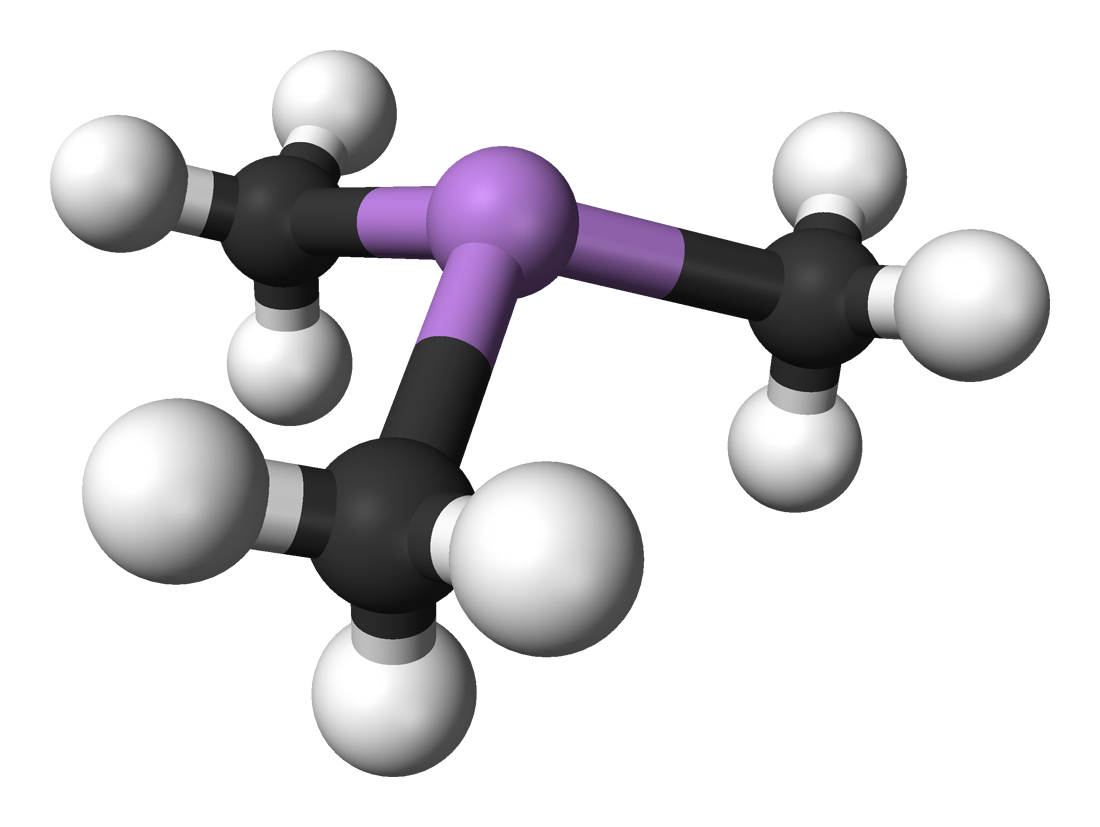
- Ball and stick model of trimethylarsine

Names
- Preferred IUPAC name Trimethylarsane
- Other names: Gosio gas; Trimethanidoarsenic

Identifiers
CAS Number	593-88-4
3D model (JSmol)	Interactive image; Interactive image
Abbreviations	TMA; TMAs; Me_{3}As
Beilstein Reference	1730780
ChEBI	CHEBI:27130
ChemSpider	62200
ECHA InfoCard	100.008.925
EC Number	209-815-8
Gmelin Reference	141657
MeSH	Trimethylarsine
PubChem CID	68978
RTECS number	CH8800000
UNII	MQ83UQ8A1Q
CompTox Dashboard (EPA)	DTXSID4073203
- InChI: InChI=1S/C3H9As/c1-4(2)3/h1-3H3 Key: HTDIUWINAKAPER-UHFFFAOYSA-N; InChI=1/C3H9As/c1-4(2)3/h1-3H3 Key: HTDIUWINAKAPER-UHFFFAOYAT
- SMILES: [As](C)(C)C; C[As](C)C

Properties
Chemical formula	C_{3}H_{9}As
Molar mass	120.027 g·mol^{−1}
Appearance	Colourless liquid
Density	1.124 g⋅cm^{−3}
Melting point	−87.3 °C (−125.1 °F; 185.8 K)
Boiling point	56 °C (133 °F; 329 K)
Solubility in water	Slightly soluble
Solubility in other solvents	organic solvents

Structure
Molecular shape	Trigonal pyramidal
Dipole moment	0.86 D

Hazards
- Occupational safety and health (OHS/OSH)
Main hazards	Flammable, toxic
- GHS labelling
Pictograms	(GHS06: Toxic) (GHS09: Environmental hazard)
Signal word	Danger
Hazard statements	H301, H331, H410
Flash point	−25 °C (−13 °F; 248 K)
Safety data sheet (SDS)	External MSDS

Related compounds
Related compounds	Cacodylic acid; Triphenylarsine; Pentamethylarsenic; Trimethylamine; Trimethylphosphine; Trimethylstibine; Trimethylbismuth

Supplementary data page
- Trimethylarsine (data page)
- Except where otherwise noted, data are given for materials in their standard state (at 25 °C [77 °F], 100 kPa). verify (what is ?) Infobox references

Trimethylarsine (abbreviated TMA or TMAs) is the chemical compound with the formula (CH_{3})_{3}As, commonly abbreviated AsMe_{3} or TMAs. This organic derivative of arsine has been used as a source of arsenic in the microelectronics industry, as a building block to other organoarsenic compounds, and serves as a ligand in coordination chemistry. It has a distinctive garlic-like smell. Trimethylarsine was discovered in 1854.

== Structure and preparation ==
AsMe_{3} is a pyramidal molecule. The As−C distances average 1.519 Å, and the C−As−C angles are 91.83°

Trimethylarsine can be prepared by treatment of arsenic oxide with trimethylaluminium:

As_{2}O_{3} + 3 AlMe_{3} → 2 AsMe_{3} + Me−(Al−O)_{n}

== Occurrence and reactions ==
Trimethylarsine is the volatile byproduct of microbial action on inorganic forms of arsenic which are naturally occurring in rocks and soils at the parts-per-million level. Trimethylarsine has been reported only at trace levels (parts per billion) in landfill gas from Germany, Canada, and the U.S.A., and is the major arsenic-containing compound emitted by landfills.

Trimethylarsine is pyrophoric due to the exothermic nature of the following reaction, which initiates combustion:

2 AsMe_{3} + O_{2} → OAsMe_{3} (TMAO)

== History ==
Poisoning events due to a gas produced by certain microbes was assumed to be associated with the arsenic in paint. In 1893 the Italian physician Bartolomeo Gosio published his results on "Gosio gas" that was subsequently shown to contain trimethylarsine. Under wet conditions, the mold Microascus brevicaulis produces significant amounts of methyl arsines via methylation of arsenic-containing inorganic pigments, especially Paris green and Scheele's Green, which were once used in indoor wallpapers. Newer studies show that trimethylarsine has a low toxicity and could therefore not account for the death and the severe health problems observed in the 19th century.

== Safety ==
Trimethylarsine is potentially hazardous, although the toxicity of this compound is often exaggerated.
