= Trimethylbismuth =

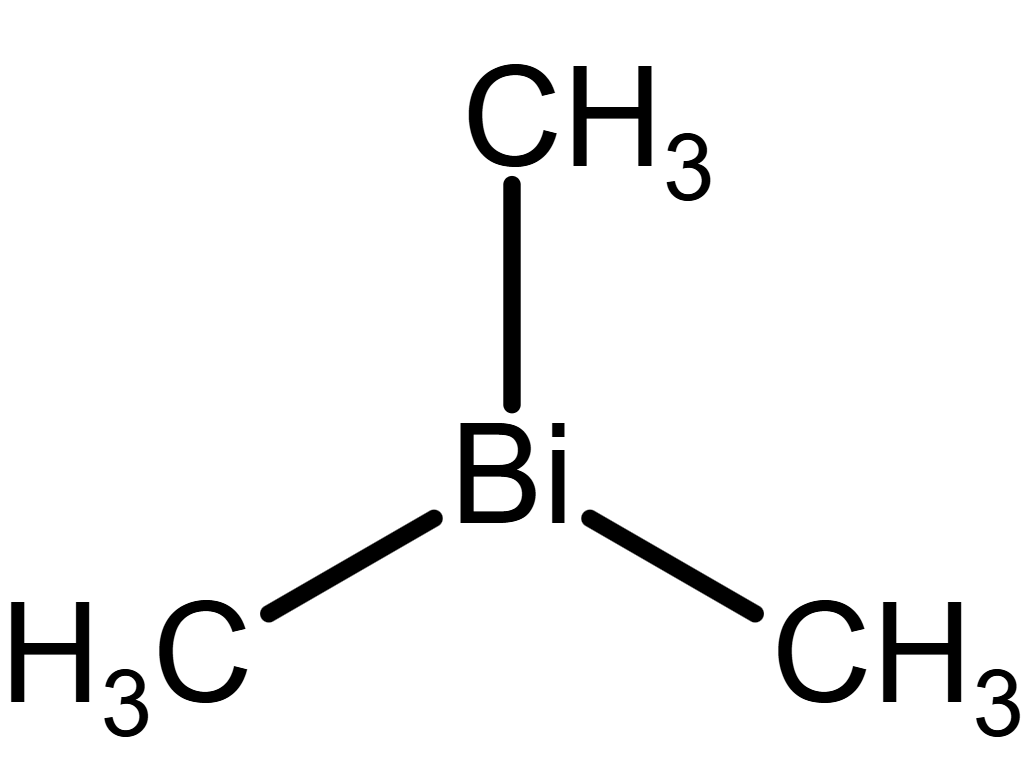

Names
- IUPAC name Trimethylbismuthane
- Other names: Trimethylbismuthine; Trimethylbismuth; TMBi; Bismuth trimethyl

Identifiers
CAS Number	593-91-9
3D model (JSmol)	Interactive image
ChemSpider	11161
ECHA InfoCard	100.008.927
EC Number	209-817-9
PubChem CID	11651
UNII	YN5YM172EY
CompTox Dashboard (EPA)	DTXSID50208039
- InChI: InChI=1S/3CH3.Bi/h3*1H3; Key: AYDYYQHYLJDCDQ-UHFFFAOYSA-N
- SMILES: [Bi](C)(C)C

Properties
Chemical formula	Bi(CH_{3})_{3}
Molar mass	254.085 g·mol^{−1}
Appearance	Colorless liquid
Density	2.3 g/cm^{3}
Melting point	−85.9 °C (−122.6 °F; 187.2 K)
Boiling point	110 °C (230 °F; 383 K)

Structure
Molecular shape	Trigonal pyramidal at Bi

Hazards
- Occupational safety and health (OHS/OSH)
Main hazards	Flammable, toxic, serious eye damage
- GHS labelling
Pictograms	(GHS02: Flammable) (GHS05: Corrosive) (GHS06: Toxic) (GHS07: Exclamation mark)
Signal word	Danger
Hazard statements	H225, H250, H302, H311, H314
Precautionary statements	P210, P222, P231, P233, P240, P241, P242, P243, P260, P262, P264, P270, P280, P301+P317, P301+P330+P331, P302+P335+P334, P302+P352, P302+P361+P354, P303+P361+P353, P304+P340, P305+P354+P338, P316, P321, P330, P361+P364, P363, P370+P378, P403+P235, P405, P501
- Lethal dose or concentration (LD, LC)
LD_{50} (median dose)	484 mg/kg (rabbit, oral); 182 mg/kg (rabbit, subcutaneous); 182 mg/kg (dog, subcutaneous)

Related compounds
Related compounds	Trimethylamine; Trimethylphosphine; Trimethylarsine; Trimethylstibine; Pentamethylbismuth
- Except where otherwise noted, data are given for materials in their standard state (at 25 °C [77 °F], 100 kPa). Infobox references

Trimethylbismuth is an organobismuth compound with the chemical formula Bi(CH_{3})_{3}. It is a colorless, flammable, organometallic liquid.

== Synthesis ==
Trimethylbismuth is produced by reaction of bismuth(III) chloride with methylmagnesium iodide in diethyl ether under atmosphere of nitrogen, hydrogen or carbon dioxide.

BiCl_{3} + 3 CH_{3}MgI → Bi(CH_{3})_{3} + 3 MgClI

It can also be sinthesized by reaction between bismuth(III) bromide and methyllithium in tetrahydrofuran or diethyl ether under inert atmosphere.

BiBr_{3} + 3 CH_{3}Li → Bi(CH_{3})_{3} + 3 LiBr

== Reactions ==
Trimethylbismuth is reactive, especially in the presence of moisture, where it can hydrolyze to form bismuth(III) oxide and methanol.

== Uses ==
Trimethylbismuth is used in material science, semiconductor technology, and chemical synthesis, where it enables the controlled addition of bismuth in various systems. Its properties make it important in producing high-performance materials for electronics and specialized chemical research.

Trimethylbismuth is commonly used in metalorganic chemical vapor deposition (MOCVD) processes, especially for creating thin bismuth-containing films. A mixture of trimethylbismuth and oxygen is used for growth of Bi_{2}O_{3} rods on a silicon substrate without using any catalyst. Trimethylbismuth is also used to grow the GaAs_{1−y}Bi_{y} semiconductor.

A Cherenkov scintillator, trimethylbismuth has been proposed for particle detection in positron emission tomography.

== Safety ==
Trimethylbismuth is toxic. It can cause serious skin and eye damage. It catches fire spontaneously upon contact with air. It must be kept under inert atmosphere.
