= Trimethylstibine =

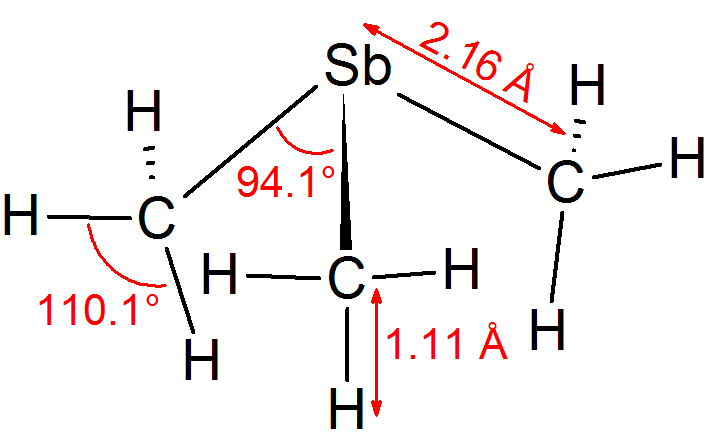

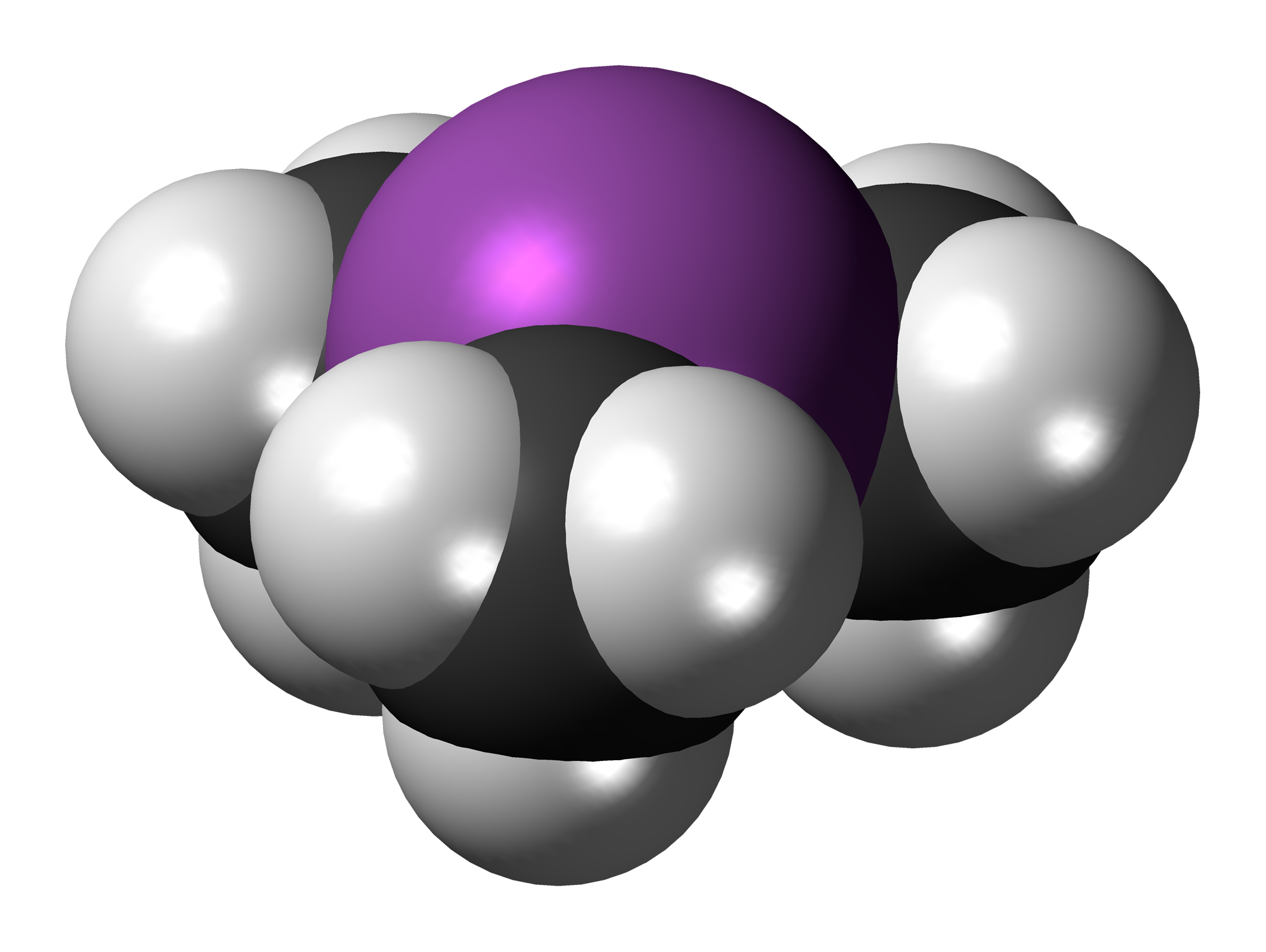

Names
- Systematic IUPAC name Trimethylstibane

Identifiers
CAS Number	594-10-5
3D model (JSmol)	Interactive image
ChemSpider	11166
ECHA InfoCard	100.008.933
EC Number	209-824-7
MeSH	trimethylantimony
PubChem CID	11656
UNII	E9DPM35Z2K
CompTox Dashboard (EPA)	DTXSID60208121
- InChI: InChI=1S/3CH3.Sb/h3*1H3; Key: PORFVJURJXKREL-UHFFFAOYSA-N
- SMILES: C[Sb](C)C

Properties
Chemical formula	C_{3}SbH_{9}
Molar mass	166.86 g mol^{−1}
Appearance	Colourless liquid
Density	1.523 g cm^{−3} (at 15°C)
Melting point	−62 °C (−80 °F; 211 K)
Boiling point	81 °C (178 °F; 354 K)

Thermochemistry
Std enthalpy of formation (Δ_{f}H^{⦵}_{298})	24–26 kJ mol^{−1}
Std enthalpy of combustion (Δ_{c}H^{⦵}_{298})	−2.896 – −2.946 MJ mol^{−1}

Related compounds
Related compounds	Trimethylamine; Trimethylphosphine; Trimethylarsine; Triphenylstibine; Trimethylbismuth
- Except where otherwise noted, data are given for materials in their standard state (at 25 °C [77 °F], 100 kPa). verify (what is ?) Infobox references

Trimethylstibine is an organoantimony compound with the formula Sb(CH_{3})_{3}. It is a colorless pyrophoric and toxic liquid. It is synthesized by treatment of antimony trichloride and methyl Grignard reagent.

SbCl_{3} + 3 CH_{3}MgCl → Sb(CH_{3})_{3} + 3 MgCl_{2}

It is produced by anaerobic bacteria in antimony-rich soils. In contrast to trimethylphosphine, trimethylstibine is a weaker Lewis base. It is used in the production of some III-V semiconductors.
