= Pentamethylarsenic =

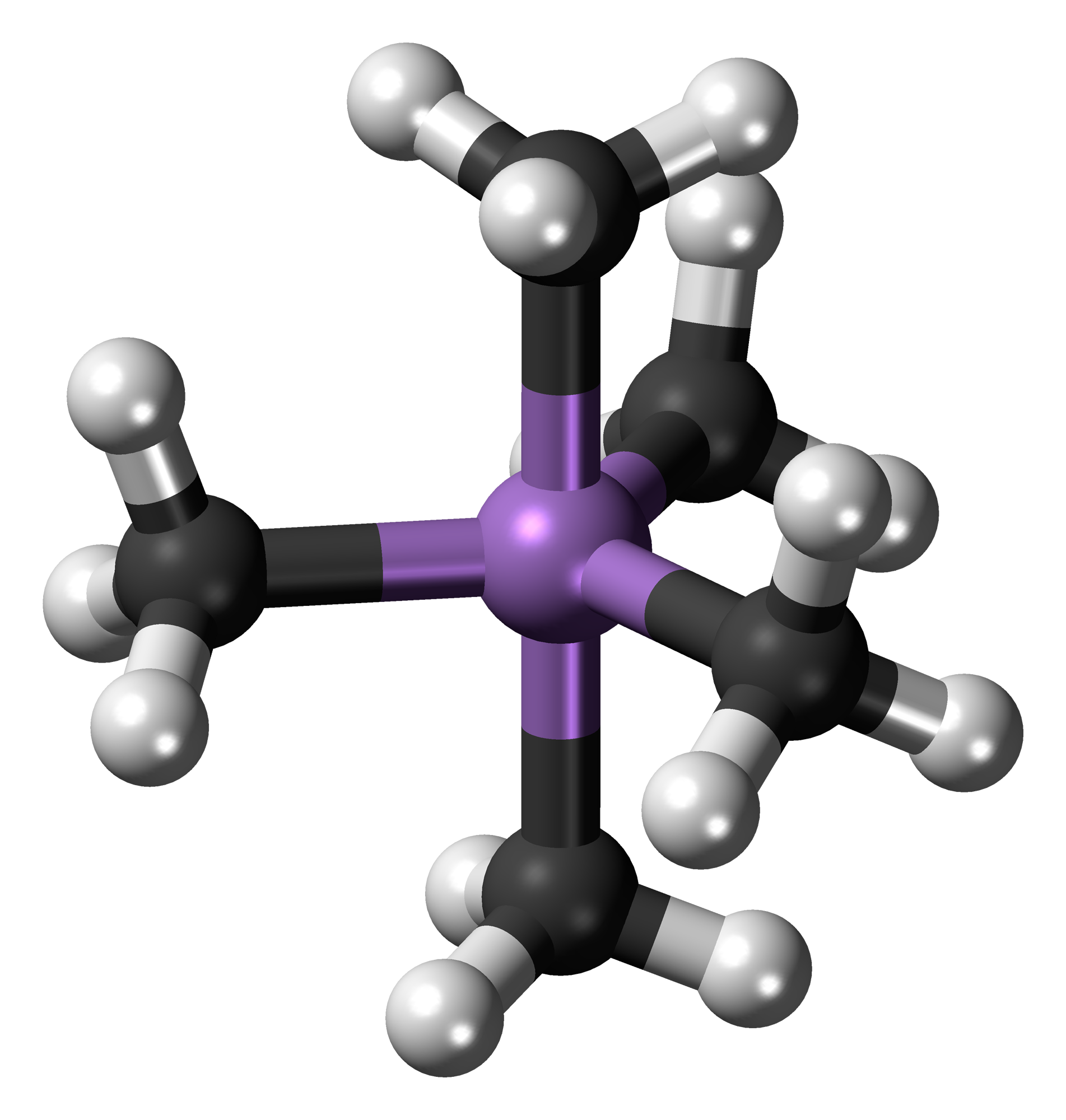

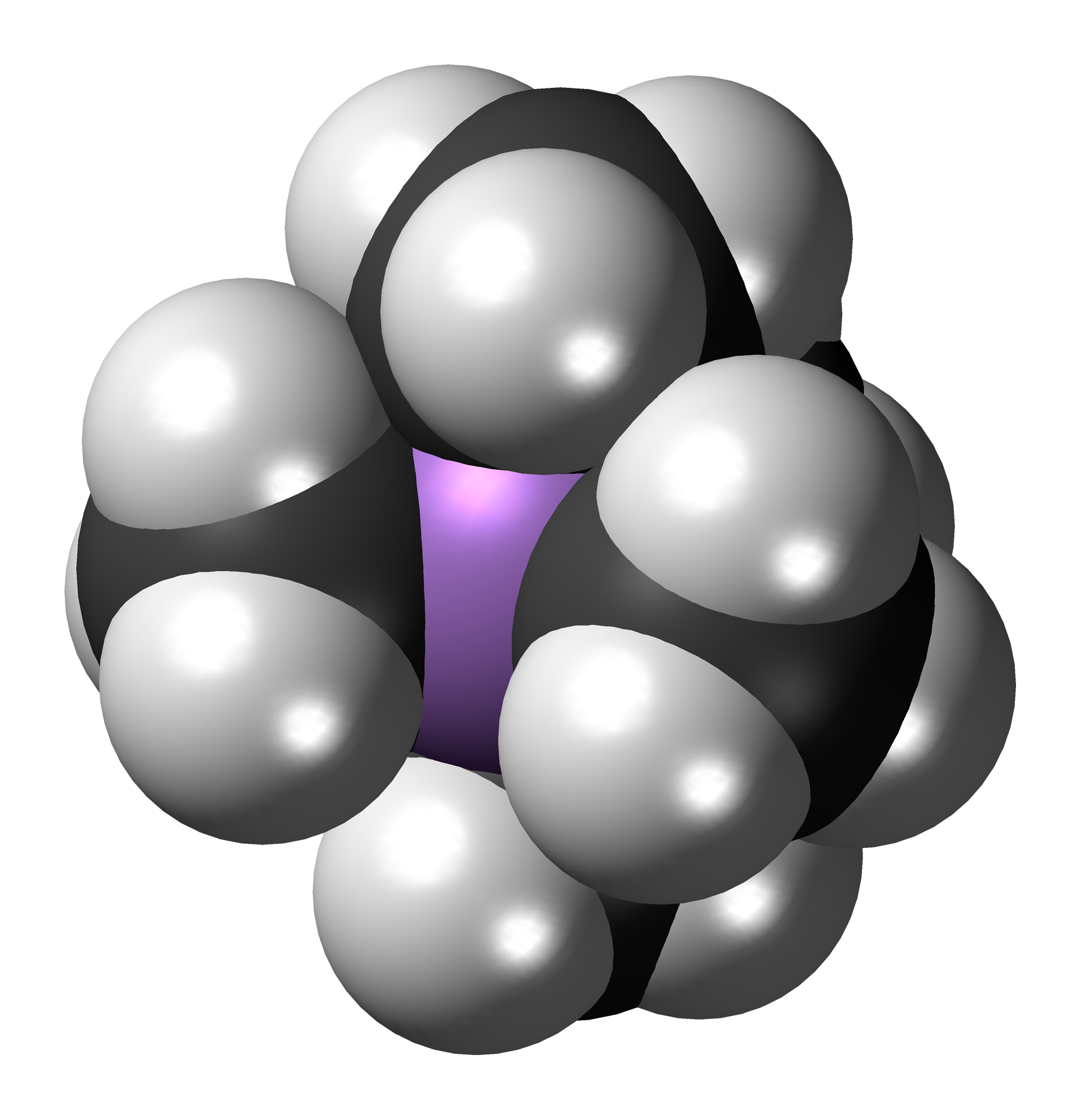

Names
- Preferred IUPAC name Pentamethyl-λ^{5}-arsane

Identifiers
CAS Number	51043-92-6
3D model (JSmol)	Interactive image
Beilstein Reference	2408247
ChEBI	CHEBI:35867
PubChem CID	9548862
CompTox Dashboard (EPA)	DTXSID401297995
- InChI: InChI=1S/5CH3.As/h5*1H3;
- SMILES: C[As](C)(C)(C)C

Properties
Chemical formula	As(CH_{3})_{5}
Molar mass	150.097 g·mol^{−1}
Appearance	colourless liquid
Melting point	−6 °C (21 °F; 267 K)
Boiling point	>100 °C (212 °F; 373 K)

Structure
Molecular shape	trigonal bipyramidal
Dipole moment	0 D

Hazards
- Occupational safety and health (OHS/OSH)
Main hazards	explosive, flammable
- GHS labelling
Pictograms	(GHS06: Toxic) (GHS09: Environmental hazard)
Signal word	Danger
Hazard statements	H301, H331, H410

Related compounds
Related pentamethyl	Pentamethylantimony; Pentamethylbismuth; Pentamethyltantalum;
- Except where otherwise noted, data are given for materials in their standard state (at 25 °C [77 °F], 100 kPa). (what is ?) Infobox references

Pentamethylarsenic (or pentamethylarsorane) is an organometalllic compound containing five methyl groups bound to an arsenic atom with formula As(CH_{3})_{5}. It is an example of a hypervalent compound. The molecular shape is trigonal bipyramid.

== History ==
The first claim to make pentamethylarsenic was in 1862 in a reaction of tetramethylarsonium iodide with dimethylzinc by A. Cahours. For many years all the reproductions of this proved fruitless, so the production proved not to be genuine. It was actually discovered by Karl-Heinz Mitschke and Hubert Schmidbaur in 1973.

== Production ==
Trimethylarsine is chlorinated to trimethylarsine dichloride, which then reacts with methyl lithium to yield pentamethylarsenic.

As(CH_{3})_{3} + Cl_{2} → As(CH_{3})_{3}Cl_{2}
As(CH_{3})_{3}Cl_{2} + 2LiCH_{3} → As(CH_{3})_{5} + 2LiCl

Side products include As(CH_{3})_{4}Cl and As(CH_{3})_{3}=CH_{2}.

Pentamethylarsenic is not produced by biological organisms.

== Properties ==
Pentamethylarsenic smells the same as pentamethylantimony, but is otherwise unique.

The bond lengths in the molecule are for the three equatorial As−C bonds 1.975 Å and the two axial As−C bonds 2.073 Å.

The infrared spectrum of pentamethylarsenic shows strong bands at 582 and 358 cm^{−1} due to axial C-As vibration, and weaker bands at 265 and 297 cm^{−1} due to equatorial C-As vibration. Raman spectrum shows a strong feature at 519, 388, and 113 cm^{−1}, and weak lines at 570 and 300 cm^{−1}.

== Reactions ==
Pentamethylarsenic reacts slowly with weak acids. With water it forms tetramethylarsonium hydroxide As(CH_{3})_{4}OH and trimethylarsenic oxide As(CH_{3})_{3}O. With methanol, tetramethylmethoxyarsorane As(CH_{3})_{4}OCH_{3} is produced. Hydrogen halides react resulting in the formation of tetramethylarsonium halide salts.

When pentamethylarsenic is heated to 100° it decomposes forming trimethylarsine, methane, and ethylene.

When trimethylindium reacts with pentamethylarsenic in benzene solution, a salt precipitates: tetramethylarsenic(V)tetramethylindate(III).
