= Trimethylphosphine =

- Stereo, skeletal formula of trimethylphosphine with the lone pair of electrons shown, and all explicit hydrogens added

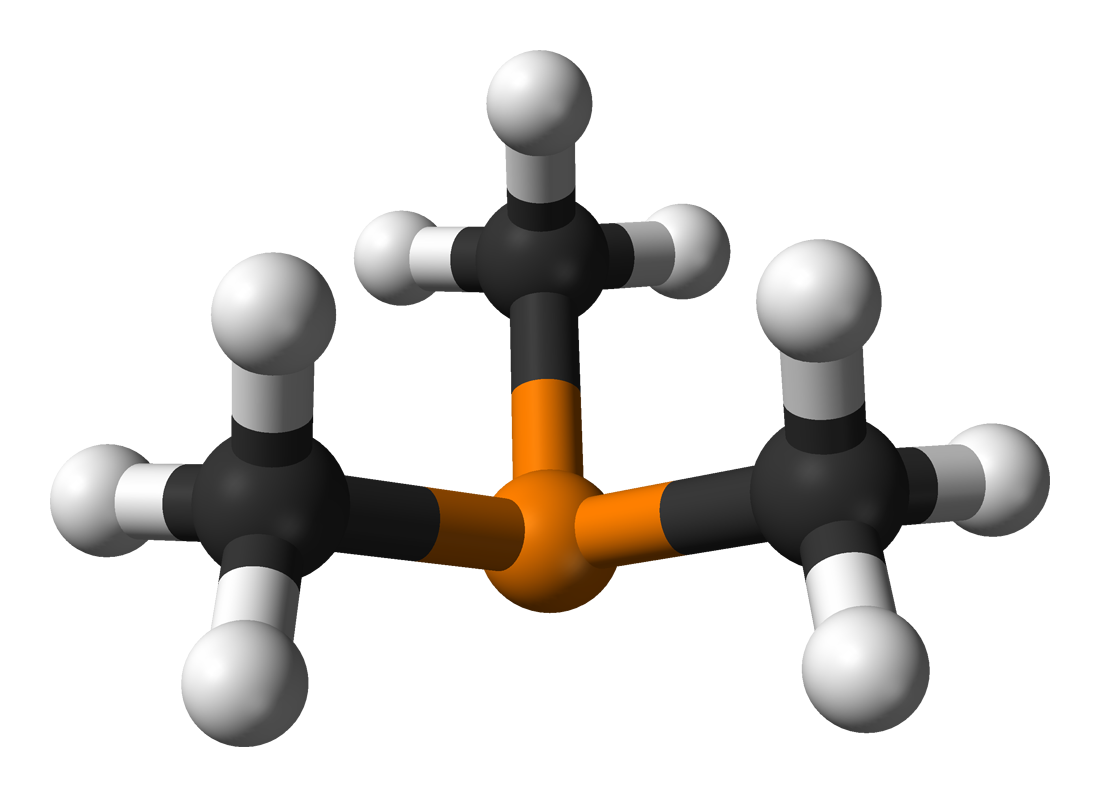
- Ball and stick model of trimethylphosphine

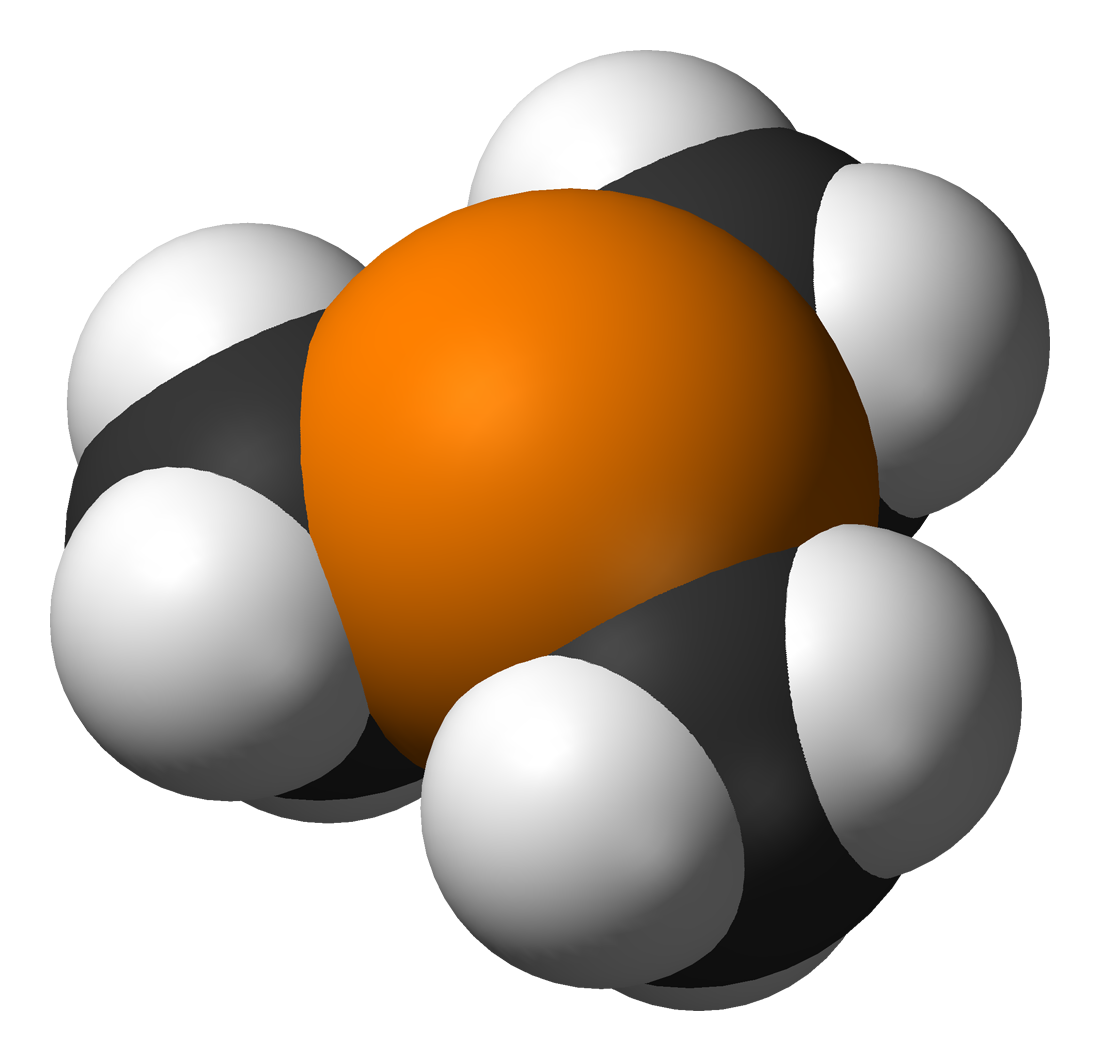

Names
- Preferred IUPAC name Trimethylphosphane
- Systematic IUPAC name Trimethylphosphane (substitutive); Trimethylphosphorus (additive)

Identifiers
CAS Number	594-09-2
3D model (JSmol)	Interactive image
Beilstein Reference	969138
ChEBI	CHEBI:35890
ChemSpider	62205
ECHA InfoCard	100.008.932
EC Number	209-823-1
MeSH	trimethyl+phosphine
PubChem CID	68983
UNII	5FL6SQK9H3
UN number	1993
CompTox Dashboard (EPA)	DTXSID00208120
- InChI: InChI=1S/C3H9P/c1-4(2)3/h1-3H3 Key: YWWDBCBWQNCYNR-UHFFFAOYSA-N
- SMILES: CP(C)C

Properties
Chemical formula	C_{3}H_{9}P
Molar mass	76.079 g·mol^{−1}
Appearance	Colorless liquid
Density	735 mg cm^{−3}
Melting point	−86 °C (−123 °F; 187 K)
Boiling point	38 to 39 °C (100 to 102 °F; 311 to 312 K)
Vapor pressure	49.9 kPa (at 20 °C)

Structure
Coordination geometry	Trigonal pyramidal
Dipole moment	1.19 Debye

Hazards
- GHS labelling
Pictograms	(GHS02: Flammable) (GHS07: Exclamation mark)
Signal word	Danger
Hazard statements	H225, H315, H319, H335
Precautionary statements	P210, P261, P305+P351+P338
Flash point	−19 °C (−2 °F; 254 K)

Related compounds
Related compounds	Phosphine; Triethylphosphine; Triphenylphosphine; Trimethylamine; Trimethylarsine; Trimethylstibine; Trimethylbismuth
- Except where otherwise noted, data are given for materials in their standard state (at 25 °C [77 °F], 100 kPa). verify (what is ?) Infobox references

Trimethylphosphine is an organophosphorus compound with the formula P(CH_{3})_{3}, commonly abbreviated as PMe_{3}. This colorless liquid has a strongly unpleasant odor, characteristic of alkylphosphines. The compound is a common ligand in coordination chemistry.

== Structure and bonding ==
It is a pyramidal molecule with approximate C_{3v} symmetry. The C–P–C bond angles are approximately 98.6°.

The C–P–C bond angles are consistent with the notion that phosphorus predominantly uses the 3p orbitals for forming bonds and that there is little sp hybridization of the phosphorus atom. The latter is a common feature of the chemistry of phosphorus. As a result, the lone pair of trimethylphosphine has predominantly s-character as is the case for phosphine, PH_{3}.

PMe_{3} can be prepared by the treatment of triphenyl phosphite with methylmagnesium chloride:

3 CH_{3}MgCl + P(OC_{6}H_{5})_{3} → P(CH_{3})_{3} + 3 C_{6}H_{5}OMgCl

The synthesis is conducted in dibutyl ether, from which the more volatile PMe_{3} can be distilled.

== Reactions ==
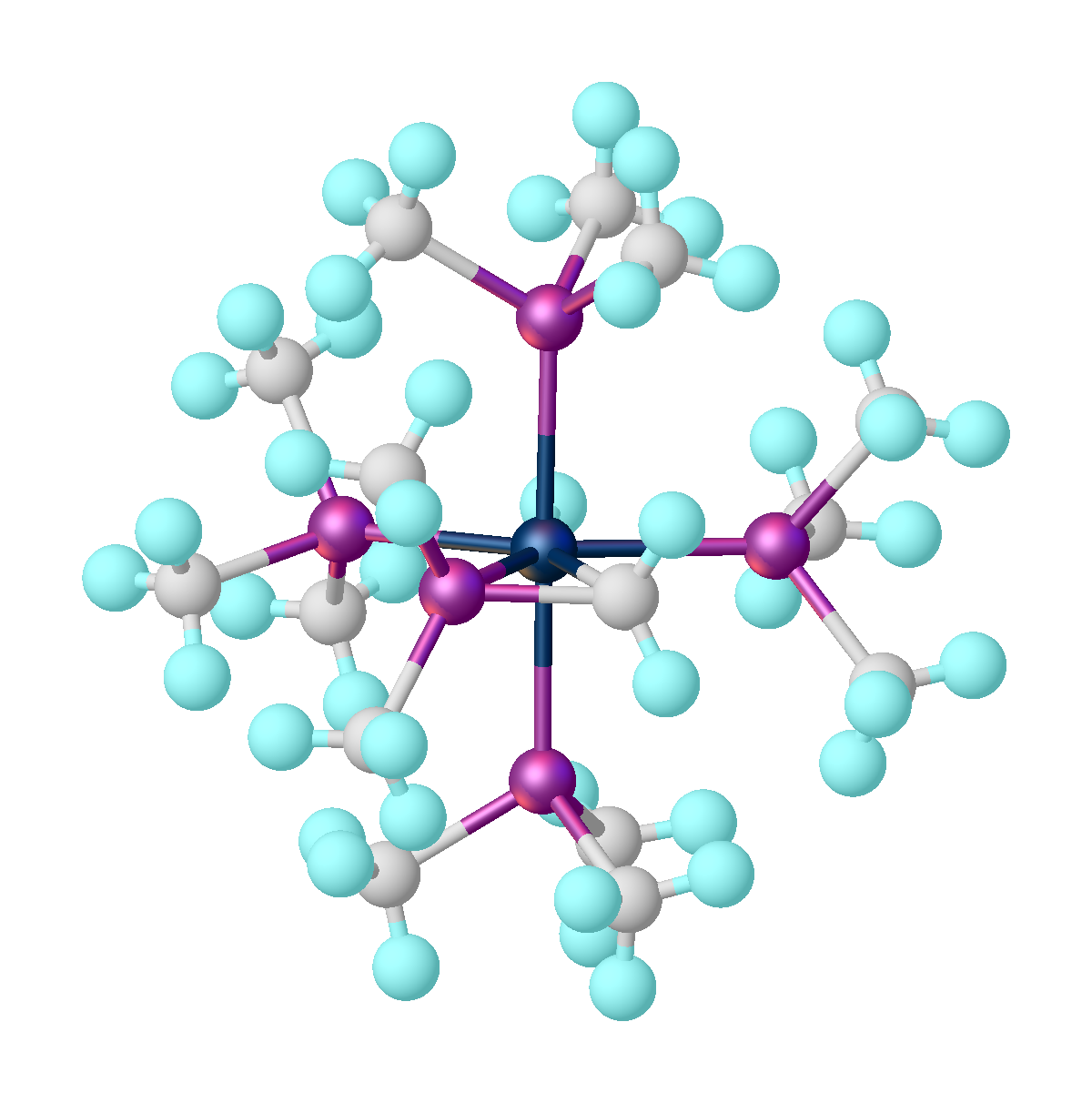
Structure of HW(PMe_{3})_{4}(Me_{2}PCH_{2}), "W(PMe_{3})_{5}".

With a pK_{a} of 8.65, PMe_{3} reacts with strong acids to give salts [HPMe_{3}]X. This reaction is reversible. With strong bases, such as alkyl lithium compounds, a methyl group undergoes deprotonation to give PMe_{2}CH_{2}Li.

PMe_{3} is easily oxidised to the phosphine oxide with oxygen. It reacts with methyl bromide to give tetramethylphosphonium bromide.

=== Coordination chemistry ===
Trimethylphosphine is a highly basic ligand that forms complexes with most metals. As a ligand, trimethylphosphine's Tolman cone angle is 118°. This angle is an indication of the amount of steric protection that this ligand provides to the metal that to which it is bound.

Since trimethylphosphine is a compact ligand, several can bind to a single transition metal, as illustrated by the tungsten complex shown in the figure.

Its complex with silver iodide, AgI(PMe_{3}) is an air-stable solid that releases PMe_{3} upon heating.

== Safety ==
PMe_{3} is toxic and flammable. It converts to a much safer phosphine oxide upon treatment with sodium hypochlorite or hydrogen peroxide.
