= Methyllithium =

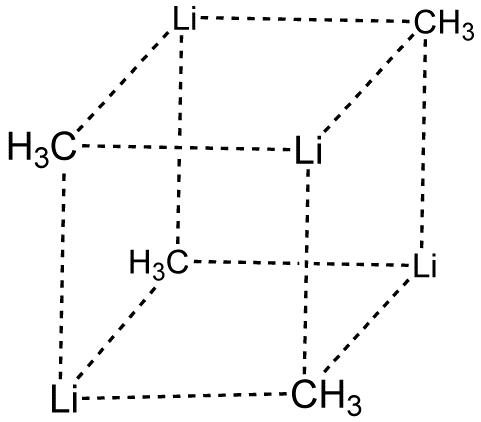
- Skeletal formula of tetrameric methyllithium with all implicit hydrogens shown

Names
- IUPAC name Methyllithium
- Other names Lithium methanide

Identifiers
CAS Number	917-54-4
3D model (JSmol)	Interactive image
Abbreviations	MeLi
Beilstein Reference	3587162
ChEBI	CHEBI:51486
ChemSpider	10254338
ECHA InfoCard	100.011.843
EC Number	213-026-4
Gmelin Reference	288
PubChem CID	2724049
CompTox Dashboard (EPA)	DTXSID7061273
- InChI: InChI=1S/CH3.Li/h1H3; Key: DVSDBMFJEQPWNO-UHFFFAOYSA-N
- SMILES: [Li]C

Properties
Chemical formula	CH_{3}Li
Molar mass	21.98 g·mol^{−1}
Solubility in water	Reacts

Hazards
- Occupational safety and health (OHS/OSH)
Main hazards	pyrophoric
NFPA 704 (fire diamond)	3 4 2 W
- Except where otherwise noted, data are given for materials in their standard state (at 25 °C [77 °F], 100 kPa). verify (what is ?) Infobox references

Methyllithium is the simplest organolithium reagent, with the empirical formula LiCH_{3}. This s-block organometallic compound adopts an oligomeric structure both in solution and in the solid state. This highly reactive compound, invariably used in solution with an ether as the solvent, is a reagent in organic synthesis as well as organometallic chemistry. Operations involving methyllithium require anhydrous conditions, because the compound is highly reactive towards water. Oxygen and carbon dioxide are also incompatible with MeLi. Methyllithium is usually not prepared, but purchased as a solution in various ethers.

== Synthesis ==
In the direct synthesis, methyl bromide is treated with a suspension of lithium in diethyl ether.

2 Li + MeBr → LiMe + LiBr

The lithium bromide forms a complex with the methyllithium. Most commercially available methyllithium consists of this complex. "Low-halide" methyllithium is prepared from methyl chloride. Lithium chloride precipitates from the diethyl ether since it does not form a strong complex with methyllithium. The filtrate consists of fairly pure methyllithium. Alternatively, commercial methyllithium can be treated with dioxane to precipitate LiBr(dioxane), which can be removed by filtration. The use of halide-free vs LiBr-MeLi has a decisive effect on some syntheses.

== Reactivity ==
Methyllithium is both strongly basic and highly nucleophilic due to the partial negative charge on carbon and is therefore particularly reactive towards electron acceptors and proton donors. In contrast to n-BuLi, MeLi reacts only very slowly with THF at room temperature, and solutions in ether are indefinitely stable. Water and alcohols react violently. Most reactions involving methyllithium are conducted below room temperature. Although MeLi can be used for deprotonations, n-butyllithium is more commonly employed since it is less expensive and more reactive.

Methyllithium is mainly used as the synthetic equivalent of the methyl anion synthon. For example, ketones react to give tertiary alcohols in a two-step process:

Ph_{2}CO + MeLi → Ph_{2}C(Me)OLi
Ph_{2}C(Me)OLi + H^{+} → Ph_{2}C(Me)OH + Li^{+}

Nonmetal halides are converted to methyl compounds with methyllithium:

PCl_{3} + 3 MeLi → PMe_{3} + 3 LiCl

Such reactions more commonly employ the Grignard reagents methylmagnesium halides, which are often equally effective, and less expensive or more easily prepared in situ.

It also reacts with carbon dioxide to give lithium acetate:

CH_{3}Li + CO_{2} → CH_{3}CO_{2}^{−}Li^{+}

Transition metal methyl compounds can be prepared by reaction of MeLi with metal halides. Especially important are the formation of organocopper compounds (Gilman reagents), of which the most useful is lithium dimethylcuprate. This reagent is widely used for nucleophilic substitutions of epoxides, alkyl halides and alkyl sulfonates, as well as for conjugate additions to α,β-unsaturated carbonyl compounds by methyl anion. Many other transition metal methyl compounds have been prepared.

ZrCl_{4} + 6 MeLi → Li_{2}ZrMe_{6} + 4 LiCl

== Structure ==
Two structures have been verified by single crystal X-ray crystallography as well as by ^{6}Li, ^{7}Li, and ^{13}C NMR spectroscopy. The tetrameric structure is a distorted cubane-type cluster, with carbon and lithium atoms at alternate corners. The Li---Li distances are 2.68 Å, almost identical with the Li-Li bond in gaseous dilithium. The C-Li distances are 2.31 Å. Carbon is bonded to three hydrogen atoms and three Li atoms. The nonvolatility of (MeLi)_{4} and its insolubility in alkanes results from the fact that the clusters interact via further inter-cluster agostic interactions. In contrast the bulkier cluster (tertiary-butylLi)_{4}, where intercluster interactions are precluded by steric effects, is volatile as well as soluble in alkanes.

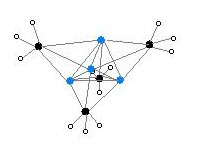
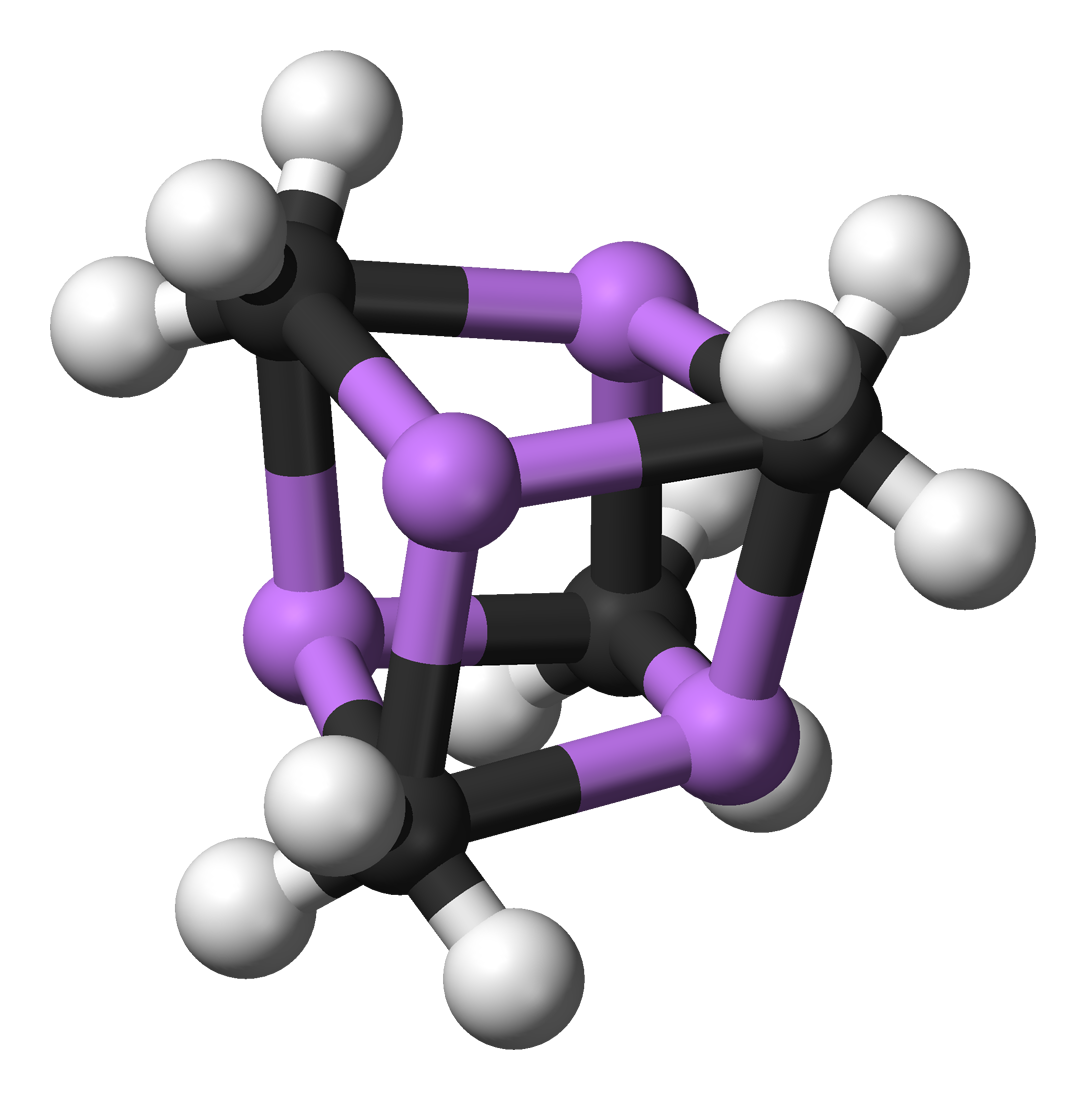
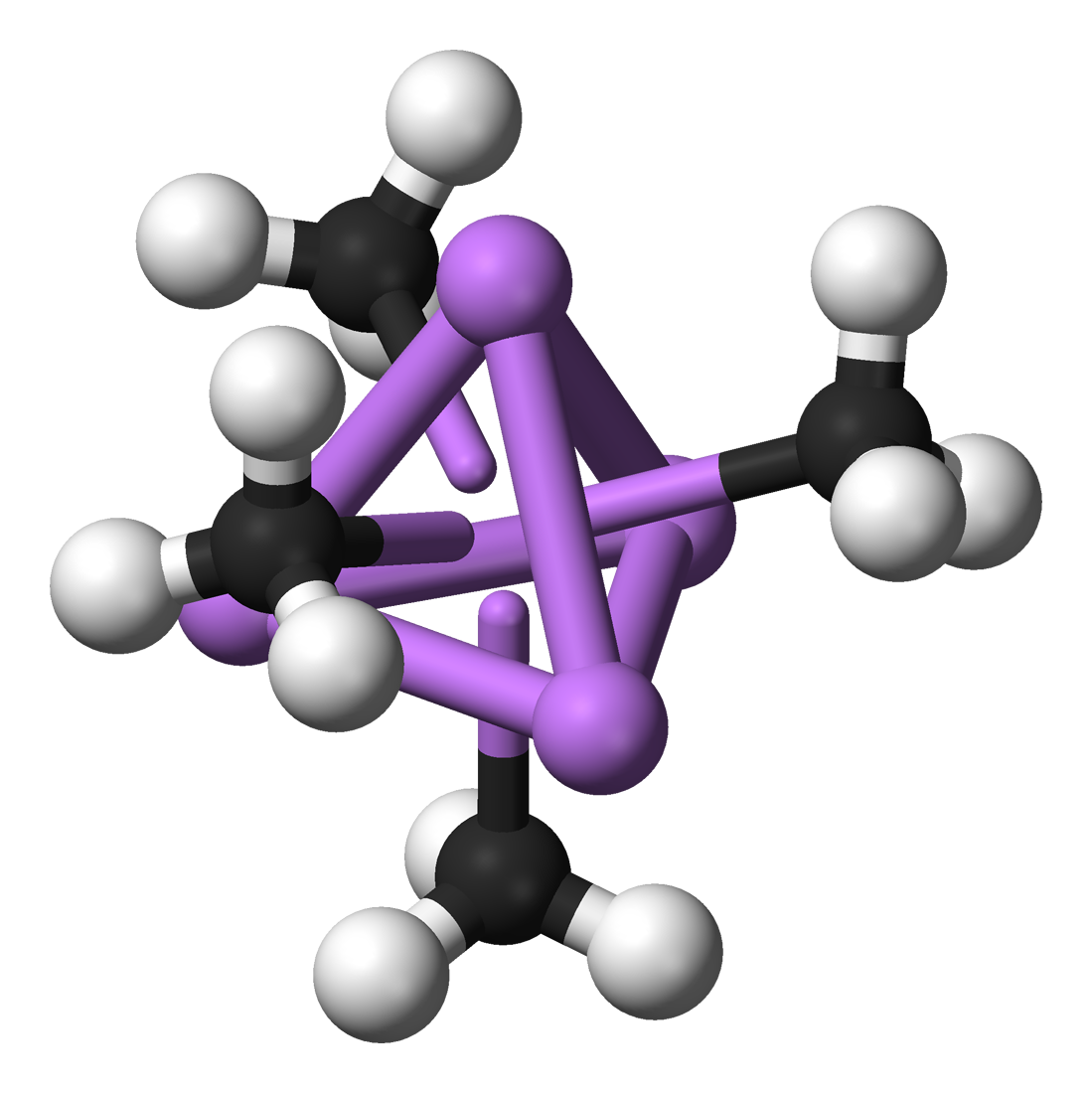

Colour code: Li- purple C- black H- white

The hexameric form features hexagonal prisms with Li and C atoms again at alternate corners.

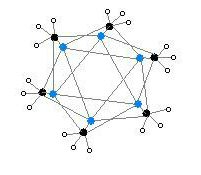
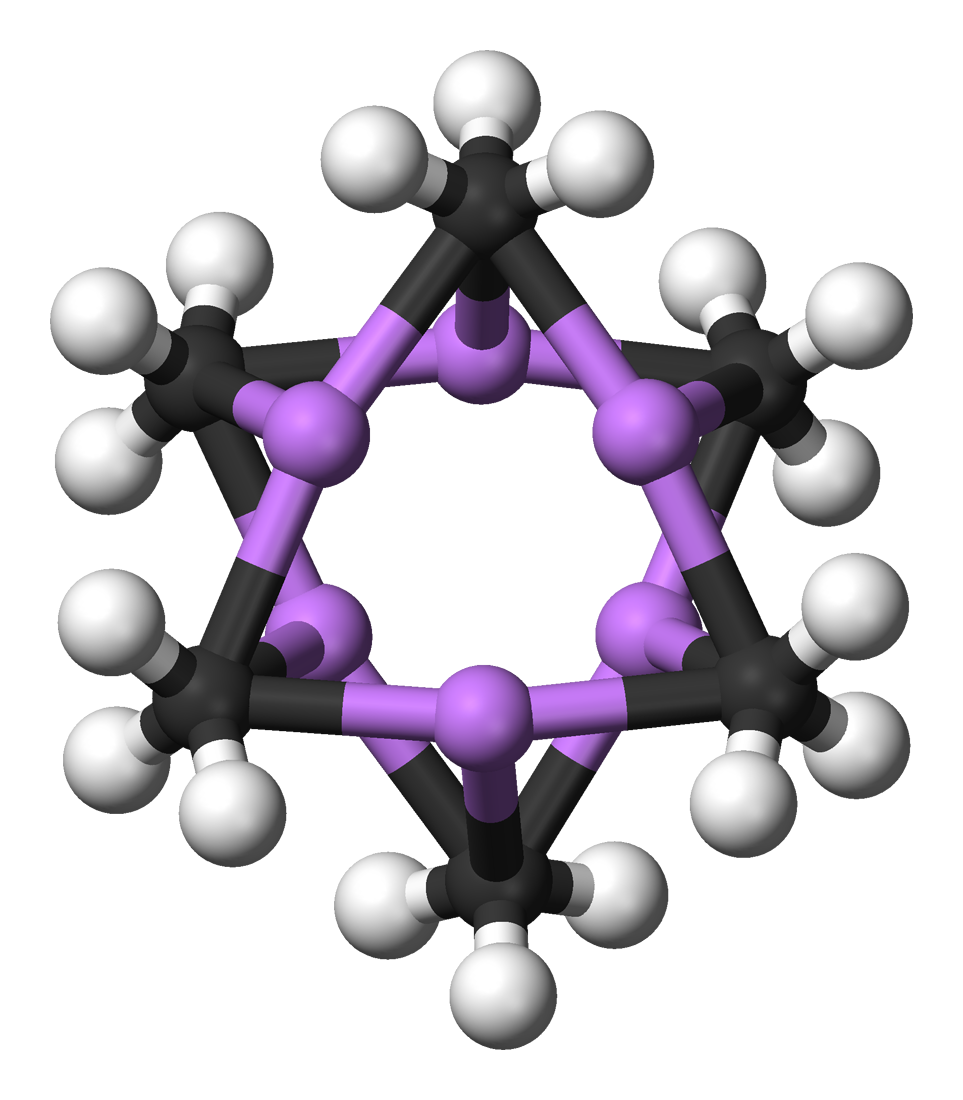
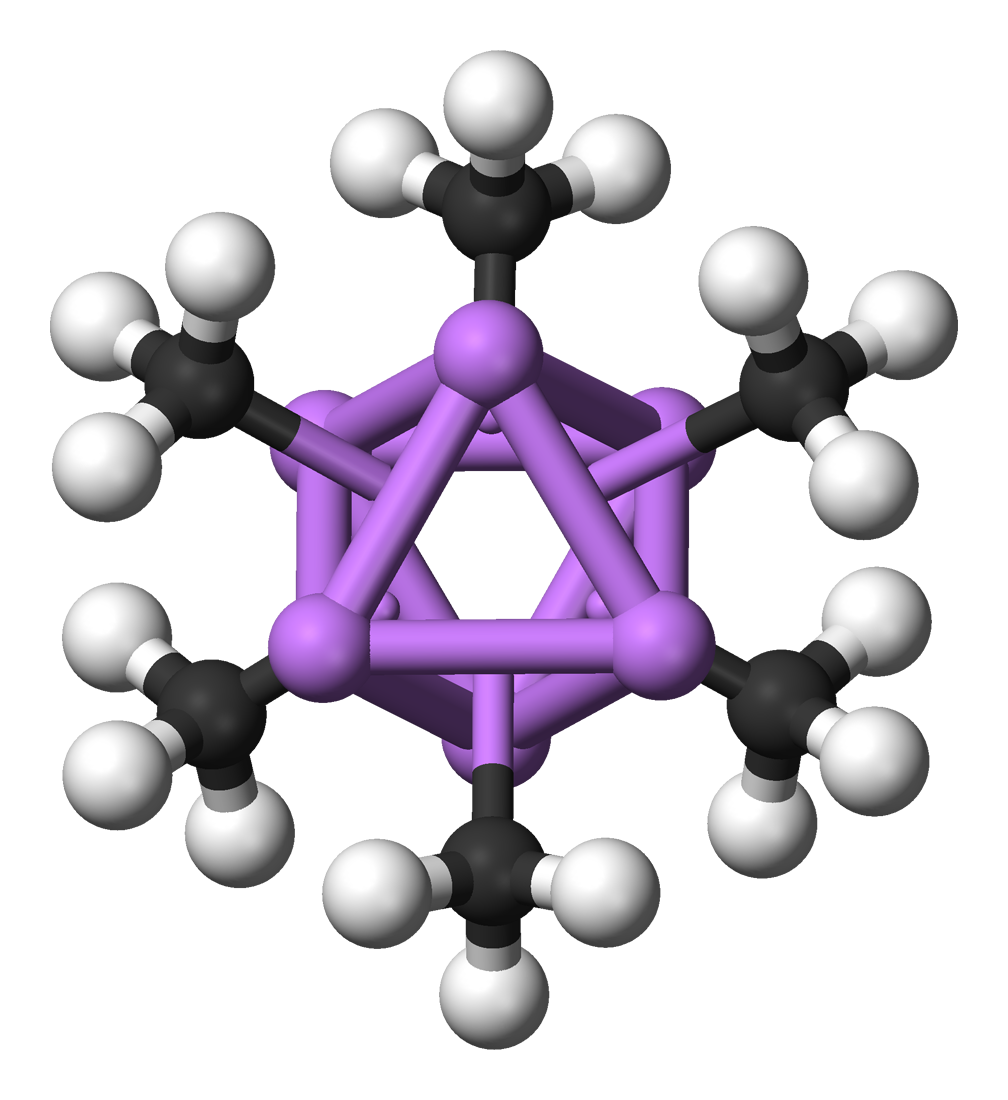

Colour code: Li- purple C- black H- white

The degree of aggregation, "n" for (MeLi)_{n}, depends upon the solvent and the presence of additives (such as lithium bromide). Hydrocarbon solvents such as benzene favour formation of the hexamer, whereas ethereal solvents favour the tetramer.

=== Bonding ===
These clusters are considered "electron-deficient," that is, they do not follow the octet rule because the molecules lack sufficient electrons to form four 2-centered, 2-electron bonds around each carbon atom, in contrast to most organic compounds. The hexamer is a 30 electron compound (30 valence electrons.) If one allocates 18 electrons for the strong C-H bonds, 12 electrons remain for Li-C and Li-Li bonding. There are six electrons for six metal-metal bonds and one electron per methyl-η^{3} lithium interaction.

The strength of the C-Li bond has been estimated at around 57 kcal/mol from IR spectroscopic measurements.
