= Organoantimony chemistry =

Organoantimony chemistry is the chemistry of compounds containing a carbon to antimony (Sb) chemical bond. Relevant oxidation states are Sb^{V} and Sb^{III}. Few applications have been reported for this class of compounds. They are of interest as heavy analogues of organophosphorus compounds.

== Antimony(III) derivatives ==
=== Synthesis ===
Stibines are typically prepared by alkylation of antimony trichloride with organolithium or Grignard reagents:

SbCl_{3} + 3 RLi (or RMgCl) → R_{3}Sb

Triphenylstibine (triphenylantimony) is one of the best studied organoantimony compounds and representative of the entire class of stibines.

1-Phenylstibole, a relative of pyrrole, can be prepared by treating 1,4-dilithiobutadiene with phenyldichlorostibine:

LiCH=CH−CH=CHLi + PhSbCl_{2} → H_{4}C_{4}SbPh + 2 LiCl (Ph = C_{6}H_{5})

It is yellow oil that resinifies (polymerizes in an ill-defined manner) at room temperature.

Antimony metallocenes are known as well:

14SbI_{3} + 3 (Cp*Al)_{4} → [Cp^{∗}_{2}Sb]^{+}[AlI_{4}]^{−} + 8Sb + 6 AlI_{3}

The Cp*-Sb-Cp* angle is 154°.

=== Reactions ===
As soft Lewis donors, stibines form some coordination compounds.. Stibines can be oxidized with halogens:

R_{3}Sb + Br_{2} → R_{3}SbBr_{2}

The resulting dihalides, when heated, release the organic bromide:

R_{3}SbX_{2} → R_{2}SbX + RX

Up treatment with metallic sodium, one C-Sb bond breaks:

Ph_{3}Sb + Na → Ph_{2}SbNa + PhNa

The stibine Sb(C_{6}F_{5})_{3} is Lewis acidic. It forms an adduct with triphenylphosphine oxide, indicating a donor-acceptor interaction between the lone pair on oxygen and the σ* level assicuated with an Sb–C bond. Sb(C_{6}H_{5})_{3} is a weaker Lewis acid than its fluorinated analogue.

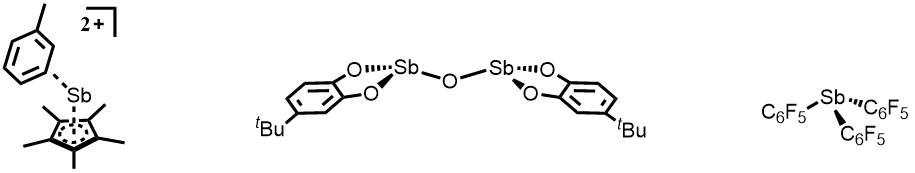

== Antimony(V) derivatives ==
Major families of Sb(V) compounds are of the type SbR_{4}^{+} (stibonium ions), which are tetrahedral, and pentacoordinate antimony compounds called stiboranes.

Stiboranes are synthesised from stibines and halogens (Ph = C_{6}H_{5}):

Ph_{3}Sb + Cl_{2} → Ph_{3}SbCl_{2}

As confirmed by X-ray crystallography, dichlorostiboranes feature pentacoordinate Sb(V) with trans-diaxial chloride ligands. The dichlorostiborane reacts with phenyl lithium to give pentaphenylantimony:

Ph_{3}SbCl_{2} + 2 PhLi → Ph_{5}Sb

Pentaphenylantimony decomposes at 200 °C to triphenylstibine and biphenyl.

Like the organobismuth compounds, stiboranes form onium compounds and ate complexes. Unsymmetrical stiboranes can also be obtained through the stibonium ions:

R_{5}Sb + X_{2} → [R_{4}Sb]^{+}[X]^{−} + RX
[R_{4}Sb]^{+}[X]^{−} + R'MgX → R_{4}R'Sb

In the related Me_{5}Sb, proton NMR spectra recorded at -100 °C cannot resolve the two types of methyl protons. This observation is consistent with rapid Berry pseudorotation.

Antimony resists forming multiple bonds, as anticipated by the double bond rule. Thus, it forms C_{6}H_{5})_{3}Sb(OH)_{2}, not C_{6}H_{5})_{3}SbO. This observation contrasts with the behavior of phosphorus compounds where C_{6}H_{5})_{3}P(OH)_{2} is not observed and C_{6}H_{5})_{3}PO is robust. C_{6}H_{5})_{3}SbO is claimed to exist as a dimer.

=== Reactions ===
Lewis acidic antimony(V) compounds have long been exploited in the form of SbF_{5}, which forms stable conjugate non-coordinating anions (SbF^{−}_{6} and Sb_{2}F^{−}_{11}). Some organoSb(V) derivatives indeed are Lewis acidic.

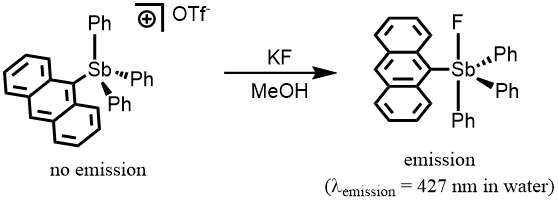
Fluoride binding turns on emission.

A 9-anthracenylltriphenylstibonium cation binds fluoride to give a luminescent adduct.

== Distibines and antimony(I) compounds ==
Structure of (PhSb)_{6}

Distibines are formally Sb^{II} compounds, but feature tricoordinate Sb atoms with a single Sb-Sb bond. They may have interest as thermochromes. For example, tetramethyldistibine is colorless when gas, yellow when liquid, red when solid just below the melting point of 18.5 °C, shiny-blue when cooler, and again yellow at cryogenic temperatures. A typical synthesis first displaces an Sb^{III} halide with an alkali metal and then reduces the resulting anion with ethylene dichloride.

Like its lighter congener, arsenic, organoantimony compounds can be reduced to cyclic oligomers that are formally antimony(I) compounds.

== Compounds with multiple bonds to Sb ==
Stibabenzene

Stibabenzene, a planar ring akin to benzene, can be prepared by dehydrohalogenation of an stibacyclohexadiene. Compounds have been made with the core structure C-Sb=Sb-C, the main requirement being that the organic substituent must be bulky.

== Safety ==
Antimony compounds are toxic. Organoantimony compounds occur in nature. Their biogenesis and structures are proposed to be similar to some organoarsenic derivatives.
