= Pentaphenylantimony =

Names
- Preferred IUPAC name Pentaphenyl-λ^{5}-stibane

Identifiers
CAS Number	2170-05-0
3D model (JSmol)	Interactive image
ChemSpider	9987829
PubChem CID	11813170
CompTox Dashboard (EPA)	DTXSID60473337
- InChI: InChI=1S/5C6H5.Sb/c5*1-2-4-6-5-3-1;/h5*1-5H; Key: XJQGITRIKZCKRF-UHFFFAOYSA-N
- SMILES: C1=CC=C(C=C1)[Sb](C2=CC=CC=C2)(C3=CC=CC=C3)(C4=CC=CC=C4)C5=CC=CC=C5

Properties
Chemical formula	C_{30}H_{25}Sb
Molar mass	507.290 g·mol^{−1}
Appearance	Colorless crystals

Related compounds
Other cations	PPh_{5} AsPh_{5} BiPh_{5}
Related compounds	Pentamethylantimony; Pentaethylantimony
- Except where otherwise noted, data are given for materials in their standard state (at 25 °C [77 °F], 100 kPa). Infobox references

Pentaphenylantimony is an organoantimony compound containing five phenyl groups attached to one antimony atom. It has formula Sb(C_{6}H_{5})_{5} (or SbPh_{5}).

== Structure ==
The structure of pentaphenylantimony has been the subject of several studies, and a definite ground state remains uncertain. The molecule adopts a roughly square pyramidal shape in the unsolvated crystal. In crystals of the solvate with cyclohexane or tetrahydrofuran, the compound adopts a trigonal bipyramidal shape. When dissolved, molecules are also trigonal bipyramidal. According to solution NMR measurements, the phenyl groups all appear to be equivalent, indicating fluxionality.

Solid pure pentaphenylantimony forms triclinic crystals in the P1̅ space group. The unit cell has a=10.286 b=10.600 and c=13.594 Å, α=79.20° β=70.43° γ=119.52°. The basal Sb-C bond length is 2.216 Å whereas the apex Sb-C length is 2.115 Å.

== Reactions ==
Pentaphenylantimony reacts with a variety of protic reagents (hydrogen halides, carboxylic acids, methanol, etc). Benzene is one product as well as a tetraphenylantimony(V) compound:

Ph_{5}Sb + HOR → PhH + Ph_{4}SbOR
Ph_{5}Sb + HX → PhH + Ph_{4}SbX

Halogens also cleave one Sb-phenyl bond:

Ph_{5}Sb + X_{2} → Ph_{4}SbX + PhX

When heated, pentaphenylantimony forms triphenylstibine, biphenyl and p-quaterphenyl.

A reaction with carbon tetrachloride yields tetraphenylstibonium chloride, chlorobenzene, and benzene. Some of these reactions may proceed by radical pathways.

== Formation ==
Pentaphenylantimony can be formed by reacting dichlorotriphenylantimony with phenyl lithium.

SbPh_{3}Cl_{2} + 2 LiPh → SbPh_{5} + 2 LiCl
