= Transition metal arsine complexes =

Transition metal arsine complexes are coordination complexes containing one or more arsine ligands. Almost always, the arsine is an organoarsenic compound of the type R_{3}As (R = alkyl, aryl). Studies on arsine complexes attracted some major figures in inorganic chemistry: Joseph Chatt, Ronald Nyholm, and Brice Bosnich.

== Ligand properties ==
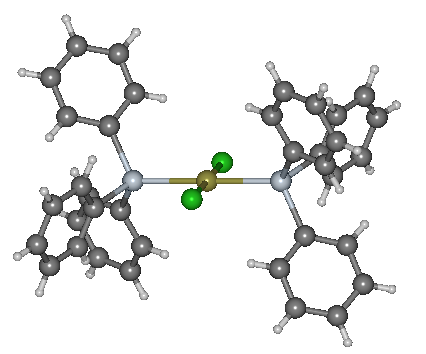
Structure of trans-PdCl_{2}(AsPh_{3})_{2}. (Ph = C_{6}H_{5})

Arsines are L ligands according to the Covalent bond classification method. In the usual electron counting method, they are two-electron ligands. With respect to HSAB theory, arsines are "soft ligands."

=== Comparison of arsine and phosphine ligands ===
An obvious difference between arsine and phosphine ligands is the larger size of arsenic atoms. Consequently, M-As bonds tend to be about 10 picometers longer than M-P bonds. Furthermore, the ligand cone angle is somewhat smaller for arsines vs phosphines: 141° for AsPh_{3} vs 145° for PPh_{3}.

The inversion barriers (ΔG*)for tertiary arsines have been shown to be near 42 kcal/mol. By contrast, the inversion of a tertiary phosphine occurs with barriers near 30 kcal/mol. Thus, chiral arsines are more configurationally stable than chiral phosphines.

The As-C bond is weaker than the P-C bond, which is manifested in some ligand degradations.

Arsines are more reluctant to oxidize to As(V) derivatives. For this reason, alkylarsines are more air-stable than the corresponding alkylphosphines.

== Representative ligands ==
Symmetrical triorganoarsines are well-established, including triphenylarsine and trimethylarsine. A well studied chelating ditertiary arsine is diars, C_{6}H_{4}(As(CH_{3})_{2})_{2}, which gained renown for the stabilization of high oxidation state complexes.

== Synthesis and reactions ==
Metal arsine complexes are heavy analogues of the more widely studied metal-phosphine complexes. Arsine-halide complexes are prepared by reactions of metal halides with preformed arsines. For example, treatment of a suspension of platinum(II) chloride in ethanol with triethylarsine yields monomeric bis(triethylarsine)platinum(II) chloride. Arsine carbonyl complexes are often prepared, like the phosphine analogues, by thermal or UV-induced displacement of CO ligands.

As catalysts for cross-coupling reactions, palladium-arsines are sometimes superior to their phosphine analogues.
