= Pentaphenylbismuth =

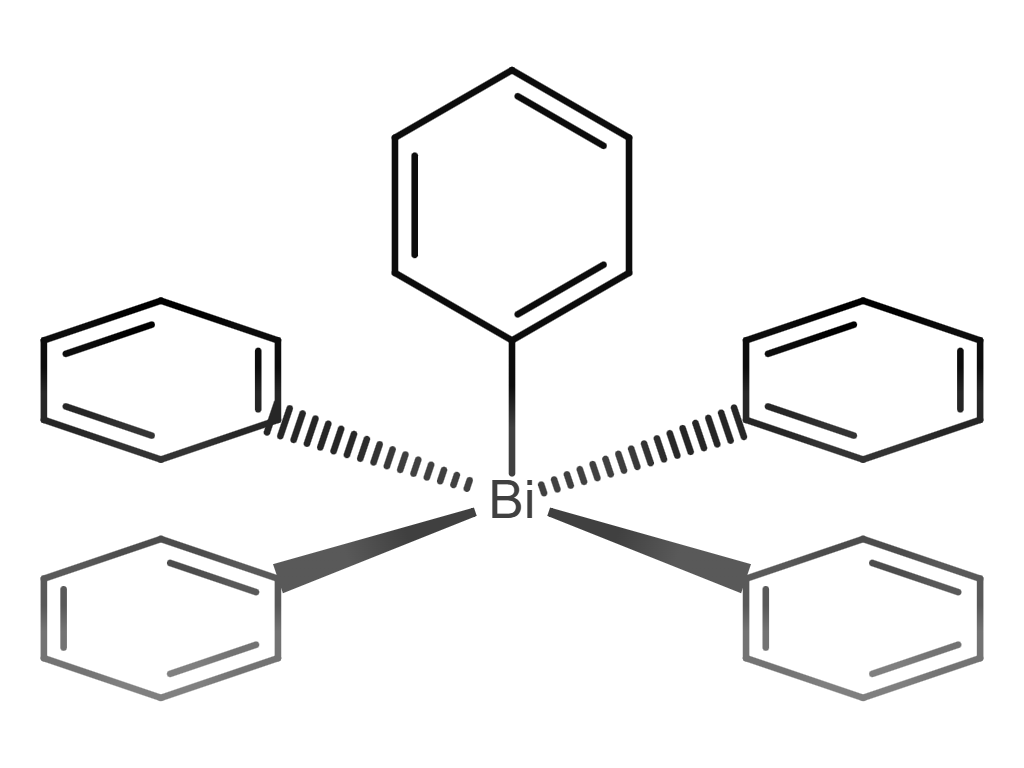

Names
- Preferred IUPAC name Pentaphenyl-λ^{5}-bismuthane

Identifiers
CAS Number	3049-07-8
3D model (JSmol)	Interactive image
ChemSpider	9459792
PubChem CID	11284798
CompTox Dashboard (EPA)	DTXSID90461121
- InChI: InChI=1S/5C6H5.Bi/c5*1-2-4-6-5-3-1;/h5*1-5H; Key: QDMQUFOAICUUAW-UHFFFAOYSA-N
- SMILES: C1=CC=C(C=C1)[Bi](C2=CC=CC=C2)(C3=CC=CC=C3)(C4=CC=CC=C4)C5=CC=CC=C5

Properties
Chemical formula	Bi(C_{6}H_{5})_{5}
Molar mass	594.510 g·mol^{−1}
Appearance	Violet crystals

Related compounds
Related compounds	Triphenylbismuthine; Pentaphenylphosphorus; Pentaphenylarsenic; Pentaphenylantimony; Pentamethylbismuth
- Except where otherwise noted, data are given for materials in their standard state (at 25 °C [77 °F], 100 kPa). Infobox references

Pentaphenylbismuth is an organobismuth compound with formula Bi(C_{6}H_{5})_{5}, often abbreviated as BiPh_{5}, where Ph stands for phenyl. It is a violet crystalline solid. A molecule of pentaphenylbismuth consists of five phenyl groups attached to one bismuth atom. In this compound, bismuth is hypervalent.

== History ==
Pentaphenylbismuth was prepared by Georg Wittig et al. and his coworker K. Clauss in 1952.

== Synthesis ==
Pentaphenylbismuth can be synthesized by reaction of triphenylbismuth dichloride with phenyllithium.

Ph_{3}BiCl_{2} + 2 PhLi → BiPh_{5} + 2 LiCl

Triphenylbismuth dichloride itself can be synthesized by oxidation of triphenylbismuth by sulfuryl chloride.

BiPh_{3} + SO_{2}Cl_{2} → Ph_{3}BiCl_{2} + SO_{2}

== Structure ==
A strong violet color and strong dichroism of pentaphenylbismuth are very unusual for a compound of a main-group element. Bismith's lighter congeners, like antimony, never displays such behavior, nor when the bismuth's symmetry is D_{3h}. The X-ray structure analysis done at −96 °C (−141 °F) shows that Bi(C_{6}H_{5})_{5} has a square pyramidal molecular geometry and is thus very similar to the colorless Sb(C_{6}H_{5})_{5}, which also has the same molecular geometry.

== Uses ==
Pentaphenylbismuth is a useful reagent for the ortho-phenylation of phenols under mild conditions.

== Reactions ==
Pentaphenylbismuth reacts with sulfur dioxide to give diphenylsulfone under mild conditions in high yield.

Pentaphenylbismuth easily forms a bismuthonium cation, for example by reaction with p-toluenesulfonic acid:

BiPh_{5} + ArSO_{2}OH → [BiPh_{4}]^{+}[ArSO_{3}]^{−}

Pentaphenylbismuth forms an ate complex upon reaction with phenyl lithium:

BiPh_{5} + PhLi → Li^{+}[BiPh_{6}]^{−}
