= LCP theory =

Theory in chemistry

In chemistry, ligand close packing theory (LCP theory), sometimes called the ligand close packing model describes how ligand – ligand repulsions affect the geometry around a central atom. It has been developed by R. J. Gillespie and others from 1997 onwards and is said to sit alongside VSEPR which was originally developed by R. J. Gillespie and R Nyholm. The inter-ligand distances in a wide range of molecules have been determined. The example below shows a series of related molecules:

	F-F distance (pm)	O-F distance (pm)	C-F bond length (pm)	C=O bond length (pm)
CF_{4}	216		132	
O=CF_{3}^{−}	216	223	139	123
O=CF_{2}	216	222	132	117

The consistency of the interligand distances (F-F and O-F) in the above molecules is striking and this phenomenon is repeated across a wide range of molecules and forms the basis for LCP theory.

== Ligand radius ==
From a study of known structural data a series of inter-ligand distances has been determined and it has been found that there is a constant inter-ligand radius for a given central atom. The table below shows the inter-ligand radius (pm) for some of the period 2 elements:

Ligand	Beryllium	Boron	Carbon	Nitrogen
H		110	90	82
C		137	125	120
N	144	124	119	
O	133	119	114	
F	128	113	108	106
Cl	168	151	144	142

The ligand radius should not be confused with the ionic radius.

== Treatment of lone pairs ==
In LCP theory a lone pair is treated as a ligand. Gillespie terms the lone pair a lone pair domain and states that these lone pair domains push the ligands together until they reach the interligand distance predicted by the relevant inter-ligand radii. An example demonstrating this is shown below, where the F-F distance is the same in the AF_{3} and AF_{4}^{+} species :

	F-F distance (pm)	A-F bond length (pm)	F-A-F angle (degrees)
NF_{3}	212	136.5	102.3
NF_{4}^{+}	212	130	109.5
PF_{3}	237	157	97.8
PF_{4}^{+}	238	145.7	109.5

== LCP and VSEPR ==
LCP and VSEPR make very similar predictions as to geometry but LCP theory has the advantage that predictions are more quantitative particularly for the second period elements, Be, B, C, N, O, F. Ligand -ligand repulsions are important when

- the central atom is small e.g. period 2, (Be, B, C, N, O)
- the ligands are only weakly electronegative compared to the central atom
- the ligands are large compared to the central atom
- there are 5 or more ligands around the central atom
