= Triphenylbismuthine =

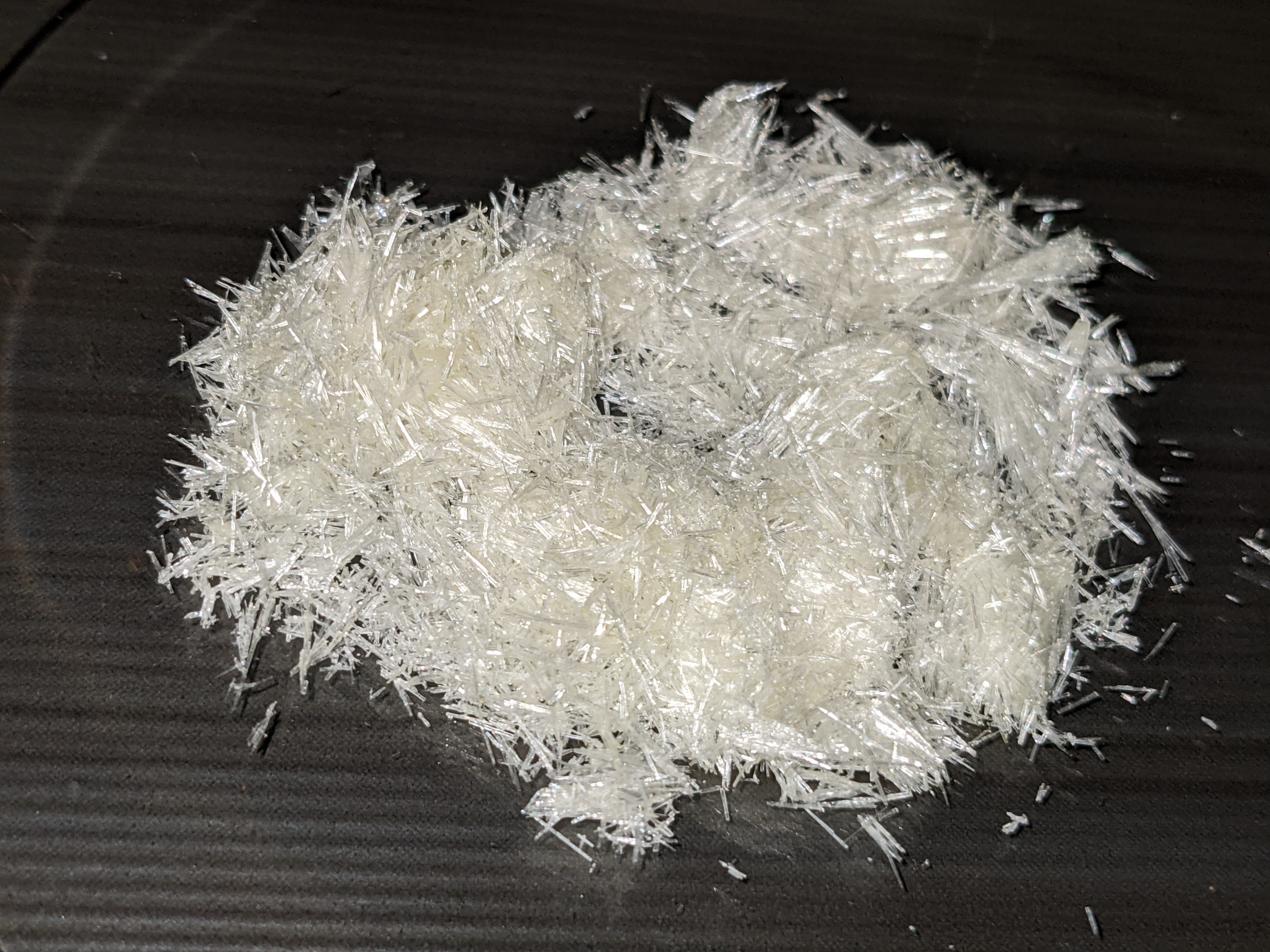

Names
- Other names Triphenylbismuth

Identifiers
CAS Number	603-33-8
3D model (JSmol)	Interactive image
ChemSpider	11281
ECHA InfoCard	100.009.122
EC Number	210-033-4
PubChem CID	11774
UNII	R18732F41W
CompTox Dashboard (EPA)	DTXSID6042498
- InChI: InChI=1S/3C6H5.Bi/c3*1-2-4-6-5-3-1;/h3*1-5H; Key: ZHXAZZQXWJJBHA-UHFFFAOYSA-N
- SMILES: C1=CC=C(C=C1)[Bi](C2=CC=CC=C2)C3=CC=CC=C3

Properties
Chemical formula	C_{18}H_{15}Bi
Molar mass	440.298 g·mol^{−1}
Appearance	white solid
Density	1.585 g/cm³
Melting point	77.6 °C (171.7 °F; 350.8 K)

Hazards
- GHS labelling
Pictograms	(GHS07: Exclamation mark)
Signal word	Warning
Hazard statements	H302, H312, H332
Precautionary statements	P261, P264, P270, P271, P280, P301+P317, P302+P352, P304+P340, P317, P321, P330, P362+P364, P501

Related compounds
Other cations	triphenylphosphine triphenylarsine triphenylstibine
Related compounds	pentaphenylbismuth
- Except where otherwise noted, data are given for materials in their standard state (at 25 °C [77 °F], 100 kPa). Infobox references

Triphenylbismuthine is an organobismuth compound with the formula Bi(C_{6}H_{5})_{3}. It is a white, air-stable solid that is soluble in organic solvents. It is prepared by treatment of bismuth trichloride with phenylmagnesium bromide.

BiCl_{3} + 3 C_{6}H_{5}MgBr → Bi(C_{6}H_{5})_{3} + 3 MgBrCl

Structurally it resembles related compounds such as triphenylstibine. The C-Bi-C angles are 94°.

Triphenylbismuthine serves as a phenyl donor in some cross coupling reactions catalyzed by Pd(0) complexes. It reacts with trifluoromethanesulfonic acid to give bismuth triflate:

Bi(C_{6}H_{5})_{3} + 3 HO_{3}SCF_{3} → Bi(O_{3}SCF_{3})_{3} + 3 C_{6}H_{6}

Triphenylbismuthine readily undergoes oxidative addition to form Bi(V) derivatives such as triphenylbismuthine dichloride.

Chemical structure of triphenylbismuthine dichloride (Ph_{3}BiCl_{2})

== Related compounds ==
- Triphenylphosphine
- Triphenylarsine
- Triphenylstibine
