= Pentaphenylphosphorus =

Names
- IUPAC name pentakis-phenyl-λ^{5}-phosphane

Identifiers
CAS Number	2588-88-7
3D model (JSmol)	Interactive image
ChEBI	CHEBI:194485
ChemSpider	2065130
PubChem CID	2785233
CompTox Dashboard (EPA)	DTXSID60382874
- InChI: InChI=1S/C30H25P/c1-6-16-26(17-7-1)31(27-18-8-2-9-19-27,28-20-10-3-11-21-28,29-22-12-4-13-23-29)30-24-14-5-15-25-30/h1-25H Key: YJOZRPLVYQSYCZ-UHFFFAOYSA-N
- SMILES: C1=CC=C(C=C1)P(C2=CC=CC=C2)(C3=CC=CC=C3)(C4=CC=CC=C4)C5=CC=CC=C5

Properties
Chemical formula	C_{30}H_{25}P
Molar mass	416.504 g·mol^{−1}
Appearance	colourless
Density	1.22

Related compounds
Other cations	pentaphenylarsenic pentaphenylantimony pentaphenylbismuth
Related compounds	triphenylphosphine
- Except where otherwise noted, data are given for materials in their standard state (at 25 °C [77 °F], 100 kPa). Infobox references

Pentaphenylphosphorus is an organic phosphorane containing five phenyl groups connected to a central phosphorus atom. The phosphorus atom is considered to be in the +5 oxidation state. The chemical formula could be written as P(C_{6}H_{5})_{5} or Ph_{5}P, where Ph represents the phenyl group. It was discovered and reported in 1949 by Georg Wittig.

== Formation and history ==
Pentaphenylphosphorus can be formed by the action of phenyllithium on tetraphenylphosphonium bromide or tetraphenylphosphonium iodide. The compound was produced during the course of Wittig's Nobel-prize-winning investigations of organophosphorus compounds.

== Structure ==
Pentaphenylphosphorus is trigonal bipyramidal, according to several determinations by X-ray crystallography. The axial and equatorial P-C bond lengths are 199 and 185 picometers, respectively.

The monoclinic crystal has dimensions a=10.03, b=17.22 c=14.17 Å and β=112.0°. Pentaphenyl phosphorus can also crystallise with solvent, (to form a solvate) with tetrahydrofuran and cyclohexane.

== Reactions ==
On heating, pentaphenylphosphorus decomposes to form biphenyl and triphenylphosphine.

Pentaphenylphosphorus reacts with acidic hydrogen to yield the tetraphenylphosphonium ion and benzene. For example pentaphenylphosphorus reacts with carboxylic acids and sulfonic acids to yield the tetraphenylphosphonium salt of the carboxylate or sulfonate, and benzene.

Pentaphenylphosphorus transfers a phenyl group to organomercury, and tin halides. For example pentaphenylphosphorus reacts with phenylmercury chloride to yield diphenyl mercury and tetraphenylphosphonium chloride. With tributyltin chloride, tributylphenyltin is produced. However the pentaphenylphosphorus reaction with triphenylbismuth difluoride, chloride or bromide makes triphenylbismuth and fluorobenzene, chlorobenzene or bromobenzene. This is probably because tetraphenylbismuth halides (Ph_{4}BiF, Ph_{4}BiCl, Ph_{4}BiBr) spontaneously decompose as the halogen reacts with one phenyl group.

When heated with carbon dioxide or sulfur, bicyclic compounds are formed, where the reactant bridges between one of the phenyl groups and the phosphorus.

== Extra reading ==
- Zykova, A.R. (2021). "РЕАКЦИЯ ПЕНТАФЕНИЛФОСФОРА С ГЕКСАХЛОРОПЛАТИНОВОЙ КИСЛОТОЙ" [Reaction of Pentaphenylphosphorus with Hexachloroplatinic Acid]. Bulletin of the South Ural State University Series "Chemistry" (in Russian). 13 (1): 31–38. doi:10.14529/chem210103.
- Hoffmann, Roald; Howell, James M.; Muetterties, Earl L. (May 1972). "Molecular orbital theory of pentacoordinate phosphorus" (PDF). Journal of the American Chemical Society. 94 (9): 3047–3058. Bibcode:1972JAChS..94.3047H. doi:10.1021/ja00764a028. Archived from the original (PDF) on 2020-01-10.
