= Hypervalent molecule =

Molecule containing main group elements with more than eight valence electrons

In chemistry, a hypervalent molecule (the phenomenon is sometimes colloquially known as expanded octet) is a molecule that contains one or more main group elements apparently bearing more than eight electrons in their valence shells. Phosphorus pentachloride (PCl_{5}), sulfur hexafluoride (SF_{6}), chlorine trifluoride (ClF_{3}), the chlorite (ClO_{2}^{–}) ion in chlorous acid and the triiodide (I_{3}^{–}) ion are examples of hypervalent molecules.

== Definitions and nomenclature ==
Hypervalent molecules were first formally defined by Jeremy I. Musher in 1969 as molecules having central atoms of group 15–18 in any valence other than the lowest (i.e. 3, 2, 1, 0 for Groups 15, 16, 17, 18 respectively, based on the octet rule).

Several specific classes of hypervalent molecules exist:

- Hypervalent iodine compounds are useful reagents in organic chemistry (e.g. Dess–Martin periodinane)
- Tetra-, penta- and hexavalent phosphorus, silicon, and sulfur compounds (e.g. PCl_{5}, PF_{5}, SF_{6}, sulfuranes and persulfuranes)
- Noble gas compounds (ex. xenon tetrafluoride, XeF_{4})
- Halogen polyfluorides (ex. chlorine pentafluoride, ClF_{5})

=== N-X-L notation ===
N-X-L nomenclature, introduced collaboratively by the research groups of Martin, Arduengo, and Kochi in 1980, is often used to classify hypervalent compounds of main group elements, where:

- N represents the number of valence electrons
- X is the chemical symbol of the central atom
- L the number of ligands to the central atom

Examples of N-X-L nomenclature include:

- XeF_{2}, 10-Xe-2
- PCl_{5}, 10-P-5
- SF_{6}, 12-S-6
- IF_{7}, 14-I-7

== History and controversy ==
The debate over the nature and classification of hypervalent molecules goes back to Gilbert N. Lewis and Irving Langmuir and the debate over the nature of the chemical bond in the 1920s. Lewis maintained the importance of the two-center two-electron (2c–2e) bond in describing hypervalence, thus using expanded octets to account for such molecules. Using the language of orbital hybridization, the bonds of molecules like PF_{5} and SF_{6} were said to be constructed from sp^{3}d^{n} orbitals on the central atom. Langmuir, on the other hand, upheld the dominance of the octet rule and preferred the use of ionic bonds to account for hypervalence without violating the rule (e.g. "SF_{4}^{2+} 2 F^{−}" for SF_{6}).

In the late 1920s and 1930s, Sugden argued for the existence of a two-center one-electron (2c–1e) bond and thus rationalized bonding in hypervalent molecules without the need for expanded octets or ionic bond character; this was poorly accepted at the time. In the 1940s and 1950s, Rundle and Pimentel popularized the idea of the three-center four-electron bond, which is essentially the same concept which Sugden attempted to advance decades earlier; the three-center four-electron bond can be alternatively viewed as consisting of two collinear two-center one-electron bonds, with the remaining two nonbonding electrons localized to the ligands.

The attempt to actually prepare hypervalent organic molecules began with Hermann Staudinger and Georg Wittig in the first half of the twentieth century, who sought to challenge the extant valence theory and successfully prepare nitrogen and phosphorus-centered hypervalent molecules. The theoretical basis for hypervalency was not delineated until J.I. Musher's work in 1969.

In 1990, Magnusson published a seminal work definitively excluding the significance of d-orbital hybridization in the bonding of hypervalent compounds of second-row elements. This had long been a point of contention and confusion in describing these molecules using molecular orbital theory. Part of the confusion here originates from the fact that one must include d-functions in the basis sets used to describe these compounds (or else unreasonably high energies and distorted geometries result), and the contribution of the d-function to the molecular wavefunction is large. These facts were historically interpreted to mean that d-orbitals must be involved in bonding. However, Magnusson concludes in his work that d-orbital involvement is not implicated in hypervalency.

Nevertheless, a 2013 study showed that although the Pimentel ionic model best accounts for the bonding of hypervalent species, the energetic contribution of an expanded octet structure is also not null. In this modern valence bond theory study of the bonding of xenon difluoride, it was found that ionic structures account for about 81% of the overall wavefunction, of which 70% arises from ionic structures employing only the p orbital on xenon while 11% arises from ionic structures employing an $\mathrm{sd}_{z^2}$hybrid on xenon. The contribution of a formally hypervalent structure employing an orbital of sp^{3}d hybridization on xenon accounts for 11% of the wavefunction, with a diradical contribution making up the remaining 8%. The 11% sp^{3}d contribution results in a net stabilization of the molecule by 7.2 kcal (30 kJ) mol^{−1}, a minor but significant fraction of the total energy of the total bond energy (64 kcal (270 kJ) mol^{−1}). Other studies have similarly found minor but non-negligible energetic contributions from expanded octet structures in SF_{6} (17%) and XeF_{6} (14%).

Despite the lack of chemical realism, the IUPAC recommends the drawing of expanded octet structures for functional groups like sulfones and phosphoranes, in order to avoid the drawing of a large number of formal charges or partial single bonds.

== Hypervalent hydrides ==
A special type of hypervalent molecules is hypervalent hydrides. Most known hypervalent molecules contain substituents more electronegative than their central atoms. Hypervalent hydrides are of special interest because hydrogen is usually less electronegative than the central atom. A number of computational studies have been performed on chalcogen hydrides and pnictogen hydrides. Recently, a new computational study has shown that most hypervalent halogen hydrides XH_{n} can exist. It is suggested that IH_{3} and IH_{5} are stable enough to be observable or, possibly, even isolable.

== Criticism ==
Both the term and concept of hypervalency still fall under criticism. In 1984, in response to this general controversy, Paul von Ragué Schleyer proposed the replacement of 'hypervalency' with use of the term hypercoordination because this term does not imply any mode of chemical bonding and the question could thus be avoided altogether.

The concept itself has been criticized by Ronald Gillespie who, based on an analysis of electron localization functions, wrote in 2002 that "as there is no fundamental difference between the bonds in hypervalent and non-hypervalent (Lewis octet) molecules there is no reason to continue to use the term hypervalent."

For hypercoordinated molecules with electronegative ligands such as PF_{5}, it has been demonstrated that the ligands can pull away enough electron density from the central atom so that its net content is again 8 electrons or fewer. Consistent with this alternative view is the finding that hypercoordinated molecules based on fluorine ligands, for example PF_{5} do not have hydride counterparts, e.g. phosphorane (PH_{5}) which is unknown.

The ionic model holds up well in thermochemical calculations. It predicts favorable exothermic formation of PF^{+}_{4}F^{−} from phosphorus trifluoride PF_{3} and fluorine F_{2} whereas a similar reaction forming PH^{+}_{4}H^{−} is not favorable.

== Alternative definition ==
Durrant has proposed an alternative definition of hypervalency, based on the analysis of atomic charge maps obtained from atoms in molecules theory. This approach defines a parameter called the valence electron equivalent, γ, as "the formal shared electron count at a given atom, obtained by any combination of valid ionic and covalent resonance forms that reproduces the observed charge distribution". For any particular atom X, if the value of γ(X) is greater than 8, that atom is hypervalent. Using this alternative definition, many species such as PCl_{5}, SO_{4}^{2–}, and XeF_{4}, that are hypervalent by Musher's definition, are reclassified as hypercoordinate but not hypervalent, due to strongly ionic bonding that draws electrons away from the central atom. On the other hand, some compounds that are normally written with ionic bonds in order to conform to the octet rule, such as ozone O_{3}, nitrous oxide NNO, and trimethylamine N-oxide (CH_{3})_{3}NO, are found to be genuinely hypervalent. Examples of γ calculations for phosphate PO_{4}^{3−} (γ(P) = 2.6, non-hypervalent) and orthonitrate NO_{4}^{3−} (γ(N) = 8.5, hypervalent) are shown below.

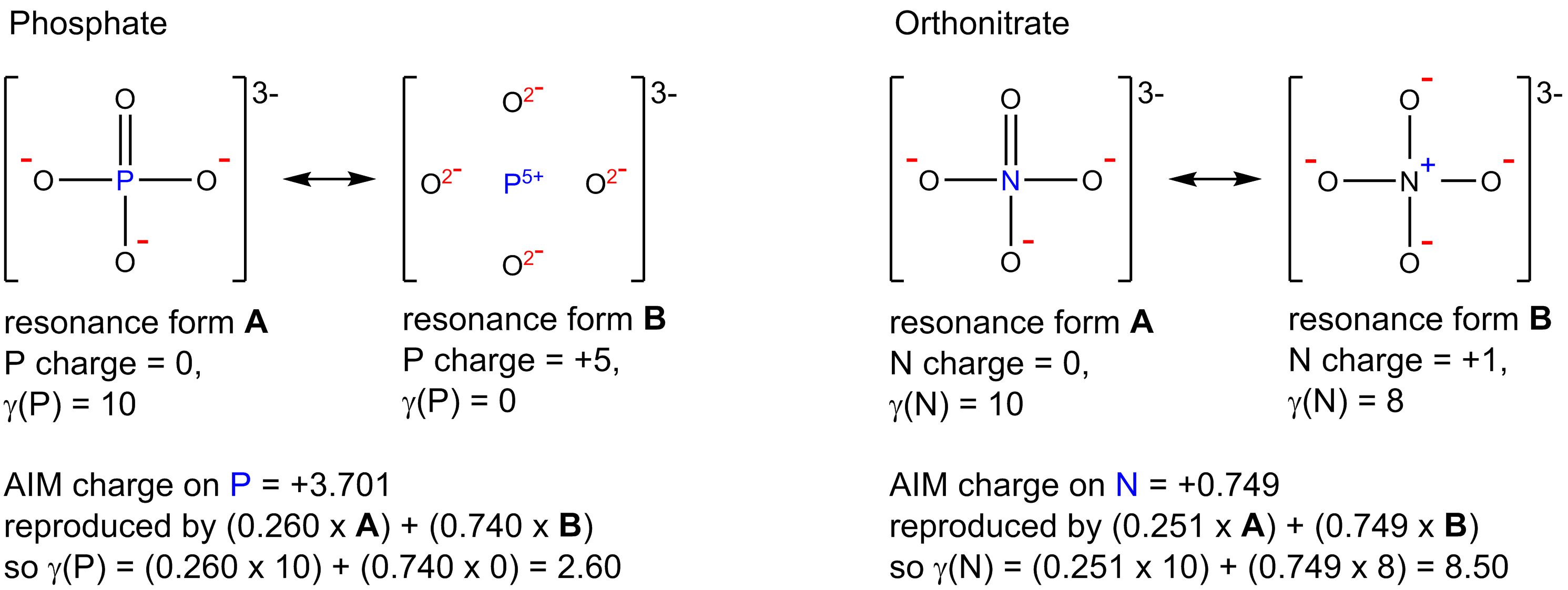
Calculation of the valence electron equivalent for phosphate and orthonitrate

== Bonding in hypervalent molecules ==
Early considerations of the geometry of hypervalent molecules returned familiar arrangements that were well explained by the VSEPR model for atomic bonding. Accordingly, AB_{5} and AB_{6} type molecules would possess a trigonal bipyramidal and octahedral geometry, respectively. However, in order to account for the observed bond angles, bond lengths, and apparent violation of the Lewis octet rule, several alternative models have been proposed.

In the 1950s, an expanded valence shell treatment of hypervalent bonding was proposed, in which the central atom of penta- and hexacoordinated molecules was thought to utilize vacant d atomic orbitals in addition to its valence s and p orbitals to form hybrid orbitals. For example, phosphorus in PCl_{5} was described as undergoing sp^{3}d hybridization to accommodate five bonding pairs in a trigonal bipyramidal geometry, while sulfur in SF_{6} was treated as sp^{3}d^{2} hybridized, consistent with an octahedral structure. This model provided a straightforward explanation within the valence bond framework for how atoms in the third period and beyond could exceed the octet rule by expanding their valence shells into the 3d subshell.

However, advances in ab initio quantum chemical calculations have suggested that the energetic contribution of d-orbitals to bonding in main group hypervalent molecules might be minimal. The high energy and poor radial overlap of the 3d orbitals with ligand orbitals result in negligible participation in bond formation. It was shown that in the case of hexacoordinated SF_{6}, d-orbitals might not be significantly involved in S–F bond formation; rather, charge transfer between the central atom and ligands, along with appropriate resonance structures, can adequately explain the bonding characteristics and apparent hypervalency (see below). As a result, the d-orbital hybridization model is now regarded primarily as a historical or pedagogical tool.

Additional modifications to the octet rule have been attempted to involve ionic characteristics in hypervalent bonding. As one of these modifications, in 1951, the concept of the three-center four-electron (3c–4e) bond, which described hypervalent bonding using a qualitative molecular orbital framework, was proposed. The 3c–4e bond is described as three molecular orbitals formed by the combination of a p atomic orbital on the central atom with atomic orbitals from two ligands positioned linearly. Only one of the two pairs of electrons occupies a bonding orbital involving the central atom, while the second pair is nonbonding and delocalized between the two ligands. This model, which preserves the octet rule by distributing electrons across a delocalized system, was also later advocated by Musher.

Qualitative model for a three-center four-electron bond

=== Molecular orbital theory ===
A complete description of hypervalent molecules arises from consideration of molecular orbital theory through quantum mechanical methods. An LCAO in, for example, sulfur hexafluoride, taking a basis set of the one sulfur 3s-orbital, the three sulfur 3p-orbitals, and six octahedral geometry symmetry-adapted linear combinations (SALCs) of fluorine orbitals, a total of ten molecular orbitals are obtained (four fully occupied bonding MOs of the lowest energy, two fully occupied intermediate energy non-bonding MOs and four vacant antibonding MOs with the highest energy) providing room for all 12 valence electrons. This is a stable configuration only for SX_{6} molecules containing electronegative ligand atoms like fluorine, which explains why SH_{6} is not a stable molecule. In the bonding model, the two non-bonding MOs (1e_{g}) are localized equally on all six fluorine atoms.

=== d-Orbital hybridization model for hypervalent molecules ===
In classical valence bond theory, hypervalent molecules are explained using d-orbital hybridization. This model is commonly applied to elements in the third period and beyond of the periodic table (e.g., phosphorus, sulfur, chlorine), where low-lying vacant d orbitals are available.

According to this model, the central atom expands its valence shell by hybridizing its valence s and p orbitals with one or more d orbitals to form hybrid orbitals capable of accommodating more than four electron pairs. For example:

- In phosphorus pentachloride (PCl_{5}), the phosphorus atom is said to use sp^{3}d hybridization to form five equivalent bonding orbitals arranged in a trigonal bipyramidal geometry.
- In sulfur hexafluoride (SF_{6}), the sulfur atom is described as undergoing sp^{3}d^{2} hybridization, resulting in six equivalent orbitals arranged octahedrally.

This use of d orbitals allows the molecule to accommodate five or six electron domains, respectively, thereby explaining the observed molecular geometries and bonding patterns within the valence bond framework.

Although the d-orbital hybridization model is still widely taught and used, it has been challenged by more advanced quantum chemical analyses. Computational studies and molecular orbital theory suggest that:

- The contribution of d orbitals to bonding in main group hypervalent molecules might be less than thought before due to their relatively high energy and poor radial overlap with bonding partners.
- Instead, bonding in such molecules can be explained using three-center four-electron (3c–4e) bonds or delocalized molecular orbitals that do not require invoking d-orbital participation.

Nevertheless, the d-orbital hybridization model remains a popular and widely used model to this day despite the controversy.

=== Three-center four-electron bond model ===
An important alternative to expanded shell models is the three-center four-electron (3c–4e) bond, introduced in 1951 by Rundle and Pimentel. This model describes hypervalent bonding in terms of molecular orbital theory rather than invoking participation of d-orbitals or violation of the octet rule. In this framework, hypervalent bonding arises when a central atom shares a bonding interaction simultaneously with two ligands through a delocalized orbital system. Specifically, a 3c–4e bond involves three atoms—typically two ligands and a central atom—sharing four electrons across three molecular orbitals: one bonding, one nonbonding, and one antibonding. Only the bonding and nonbonding orbitals are occupied, leading to an overall stable configuration.

This model is particularly effective in describing linear arrangements such as those found in I_{3}^{-} and XeF_{2}, where the central atom retains a formal octet while bonding with more than four atoms. The central atom contributes a p orbital which overlaps with ligand orbitals from opposite sides, forming a delocalized interaction across all three atoms. The presence of one bonding and one nonbonding pair of electrons in the system provides an energetically favorable arrangement without requiring d-orbital participation. The 3c–4e model thus preserves the octet rule and aligns with modern quantum mechanical calculations, offering a more accurate depiction of bonding in many hypervalent compounds than earlier d-orbital hybridization approaches.

== Structure, reactivity, and kinetics ==
=== Structure ===
==== Hexacoordinated phosphorus ====
Hexacoordinate phosphorus molecules involving nitrogen, oxygen, or sulfur ligands provide examples of Lewis acid-Lewis base hexacoordination. For the two similar complexes shown below, the length of the C–P bond increases with decreasing length of the N–P bond; the strength of the C–P bond decreases with increasing strength of the N–P Lewis acid–Lewis base interaction.

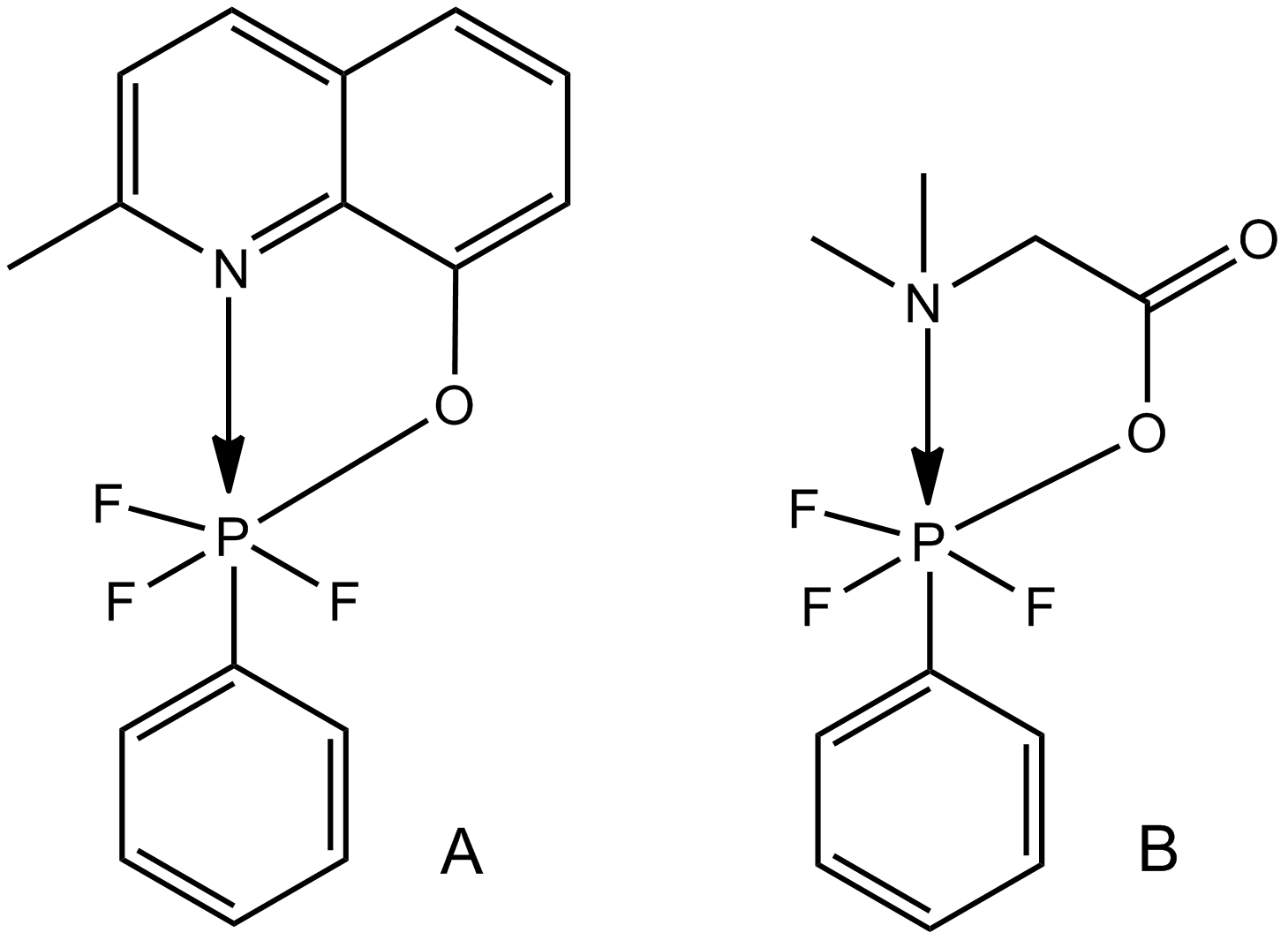
Relative bond strengths in hexacoordinated phosphorus compounds. In A, the N–P bond is 1.980 Å long and the C–P is 1.833 Å long, and in B, the N–P bond increases to 2.013 Å as the C–P bond decreases to 1.814 Å.

==== Pentacoordinated silicon ====
This trend is also generally true of pentacoordinated main-group elements with one or more lone-pair-containing ligand, including the oxygen-pentacoordinated silicon examples shown below.

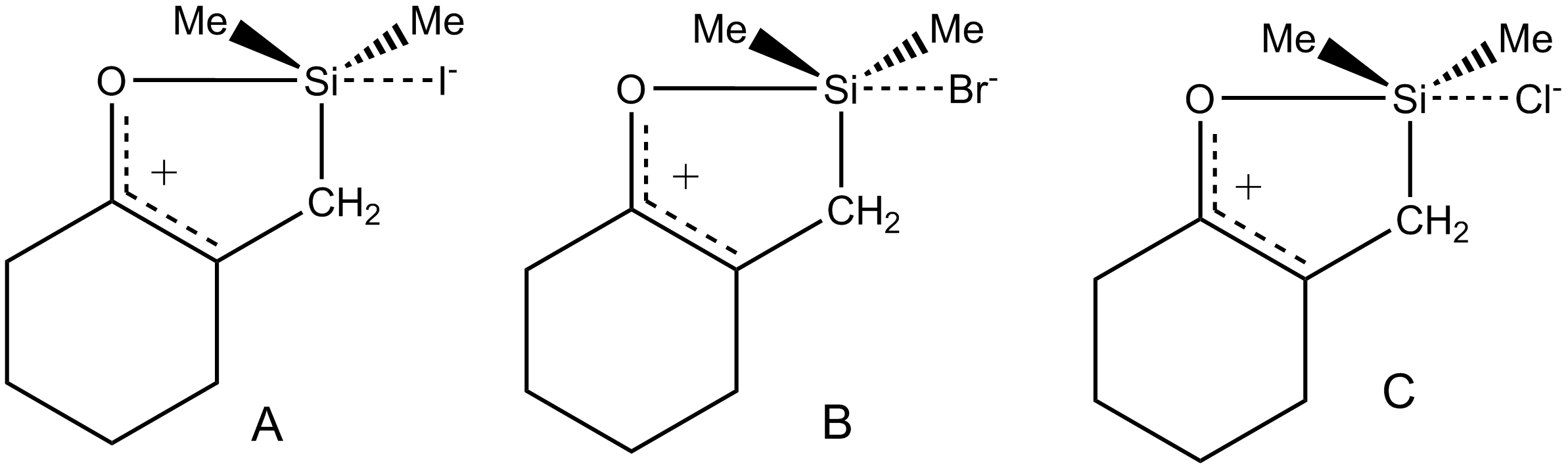
Relative bond strengths in pentacoordinated silicon compounds. In A, the Si-O bond length is 1.749Å and the Si-I bond length is 3.734Å; in B, the Si-O bond lengthens to 1.800Å and the Si-Br bond shortens to 3.122Å, and in C, the Si-O bond is the longest at 1.954Å and the Si-Cl bond the shortest at 2.307A.

The Si-halogen bonds range from close to the expected van der Waals value in A (a weak bond) almost to the expected covalent single bond value in C (a strong bond).

=== Reactivity ===
==== Silicon ====
Observed third-order reaction rate constants for hydrolysis (displacement of chloride from silicon)
| Chlorosilane | Nucleophile | k_{obs} (M^{−2}s^{−1}) at 20 °C in anisole |
|---|---|---|
| Ph_{3}SiCl | HMPT | 1200 |
| Ph_{3}SiCl | DMSO | 50 |
| Ph_{3}SiCl | DMF | 6 |
| MePh_{2}SiCl | HMPT | 2000 |
| MePh_{2}SiCl | DMSO | 360 |
| MePh_{2}SiCl | DMF | 80 |
| Me(1-Np)PhSiCl | HMPT | 3500 |
| Me(1-Np)PhSiCl | DMSO | 180 |
| Me(1-Np)PhSiCl | DMF | 40 |
| (1-Np)Ph(vinyl)SiCl | HMPT | 2200 |
| (1-Np)Ph(vinyl)SiCl | DMSO | 90 |
| (1-Np)(m-CF_{3}Ph)HSiCl | DMSO | 1800 |
| (1-Np)(m-CF_{3}Ph)HSiCl | DMF | 300 |

Corriu and coworkers performed early work characterizing reactions thought to proceed through a hypervalent transition state. Measurements of the reaction rates of hydrolysis of tetravalent chlorosilanes incubated with catalytic amounts of water returned a rate that is first order in chlorosilane and second order in water. This indicated that two water molecules interacted with the silane during hydrolysis and from this a binucleophilic reaction mechanism was proposed. Corriu and coworkers then measured the rates of hydrolysis in the presence of nucleophilic catalyst HMPT, DMSO or DMF. It was shown that the rate of hydrolysis was again first order in chlorosilane, first order in catalyst and now first order in water. Appropriately, the rates of hydrolysis also exhibited a dependence on the magnitude of charge on the oxygen of the nucleophile.

Taken together this led the group to propose a reaction mechanism in which there is a pre-rate determining nucleophilic attack of the tetracoordinated silane by the nucleophile (or water) in which a hypervalent pentacoordinated silane is formed. This is followed by a nucleophilic attack of the intermediate by water in a rate determining step leading to hexacoordinated species that quickly decomposes giving the hydroxysilane.

Silane hydrolysis was further investigated by Holmes and coworkers in which tetracoordinated Mes_{2}SiF_{2} (Mes = mesityl) and pentacoordinated Mes_{2}SiF_{3}^{–} were reacted with two equivalents of water. Following twenty-four hours, almost no hydrolysis of the tetracoordinated silane was observed, while the pentacoordinated silane was completely hydrolyzed after fifteen minutes. Additionally, X-ray diffraction data collected for the tetraethylammonium salts of the fluorosilanes showed the formation of hydrogen bisilonate lattice supporting a hexacoordinated intermediate from which HF_{2}^{–} is quickly displaced leading to the hydroxylated product. This reaction and crystallographic data support the mechanism proposed by Corriu et al..

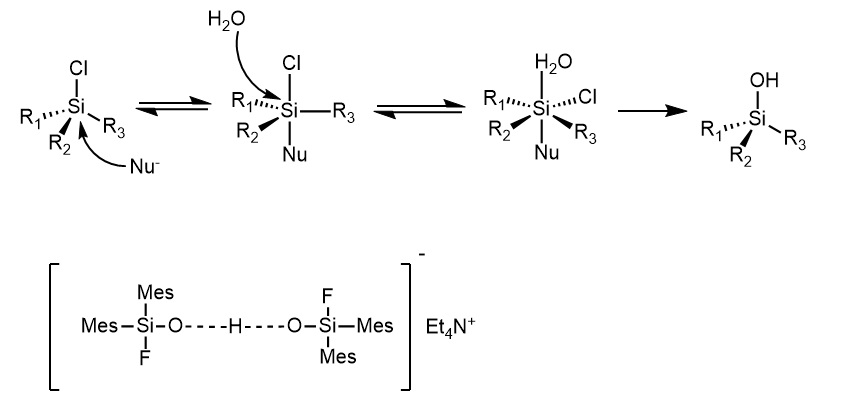
Mechanism of silane hydrolysis from Corriu et al., invoking hypervalent intermediates (top), and the structure of a hydrogen bisilonate salt (bottom).

The apparent increased reactivity of hypervalent molecules, contrasted with tetravalent analogues, has also been observed for Grignard reactions. The Corriu group measured Grignard reaction half-times by NMR for related 18-crown-6 potassium salts of a variety of tetra- and pentacoordinated fluorosilanes in the presence of catalytic amounts of nucleophile.

Though the half reaction method is imprecise, the magnitudinal differences in reactions rates allowed for a proposed reaction scheme wherein, a pre-rate determining attack of the tetravalent silane by the nucleophile results in an equilibrium between the neutral tetracoordinated species and the anionic pentavalent compound. This is followed by nucleophilic coordination by two Grignard reagents as normally seen, forming a hexacoordinated transition state and yielding the expected product.

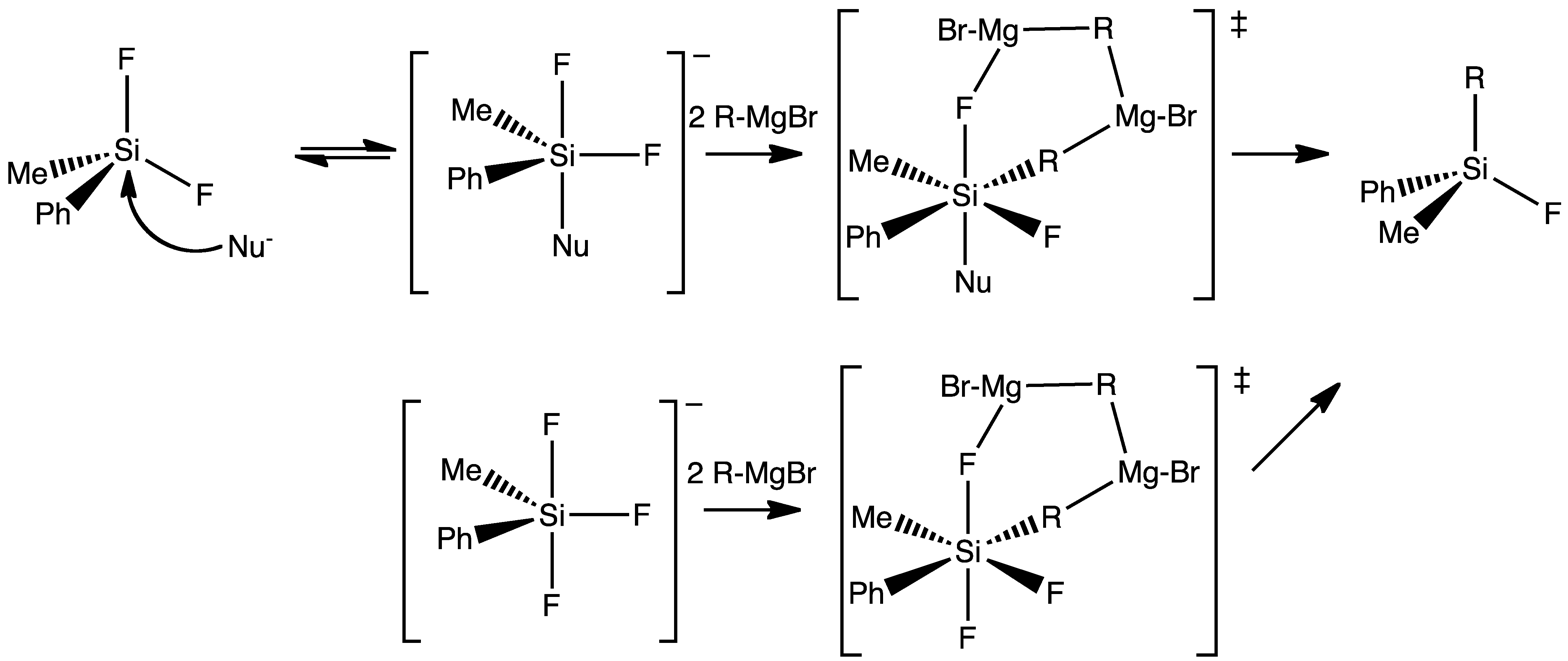
Grignard reaction mechanism for tetracoordinate silanes and the analogous hypervalent pentacoordinated silanes

The mechanistic implications of this are extended to a hexacoordinated silicon species that is thought to be active as a transition state in some reactions. The reaction of allyl- or crotyl-trifluorosilanes with aldehydes and ketones only precedes with fluoride activation to give a pentacoordinated silicon. This intermediate then acts as a Lewis acid to coordinate with the carbonyl oxygen atom. The further weakening of the silicon–carbon bond as the silicon becomes hexacoordinate helps drive this reaction.

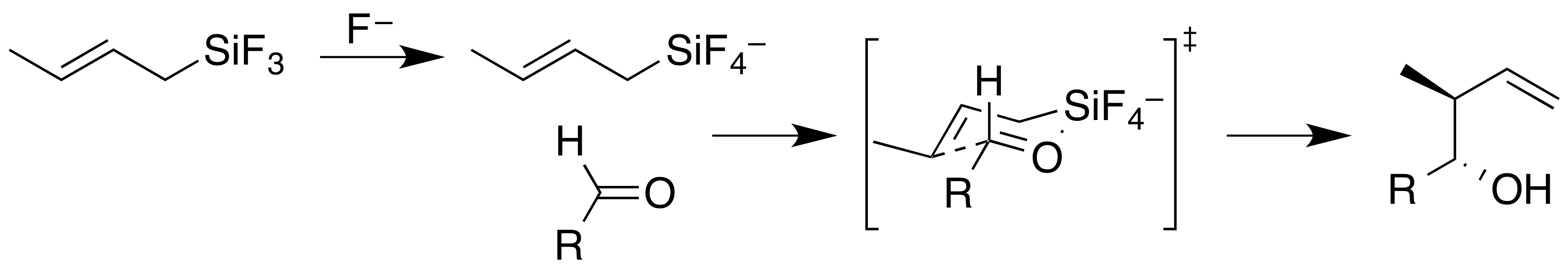

==== Phosphorus ====
Similar reactivity has also been observed for other hypervalent structures such as the miscellany of phosphorus compounds, for which hexacoordinated transition states have been proposed. Hydrolysis of phosphoranes and oxyphosphoranes have been studied and shown to be second order in water. Bel'skii et al.. have proposed a prerate determining nucleophilic attack by water resulting in an equilibrium between the penta- and hexacoordinated phosphorus species, which is followed by a proton transfer involving the second water molecule in a rate determining ring-opening step, leading to the hydroxylated product.

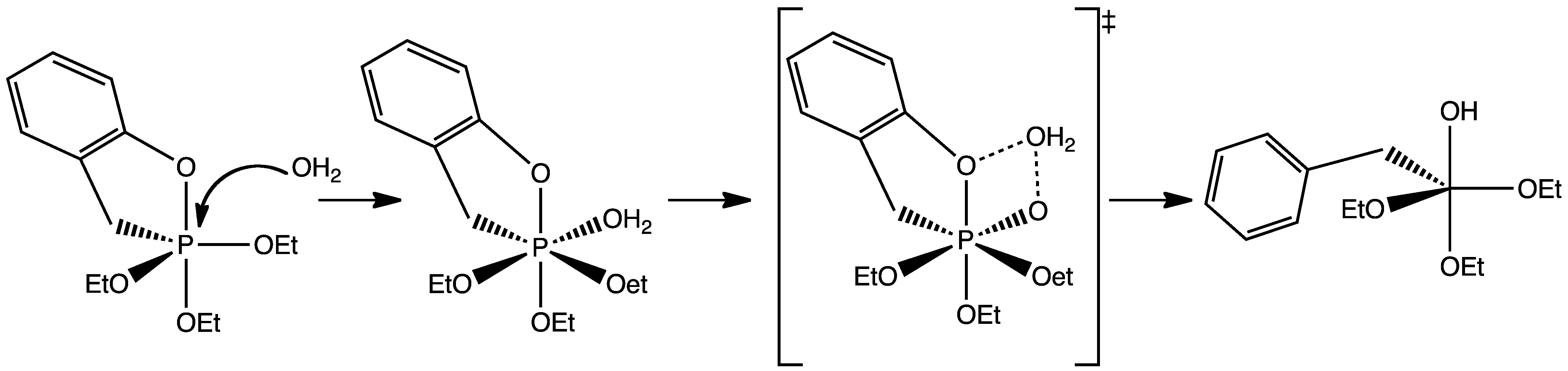
Mechanism of the hydrolysis of pentacoordinated phosphorus

Alcoholysis of pentacoordinated phosphorus compounds, such as trimethoxyphospholene with benzyl alcohol, have also been postulated to occur through a similar octahedral transition state, as in hydrolysis, however without ring opening.

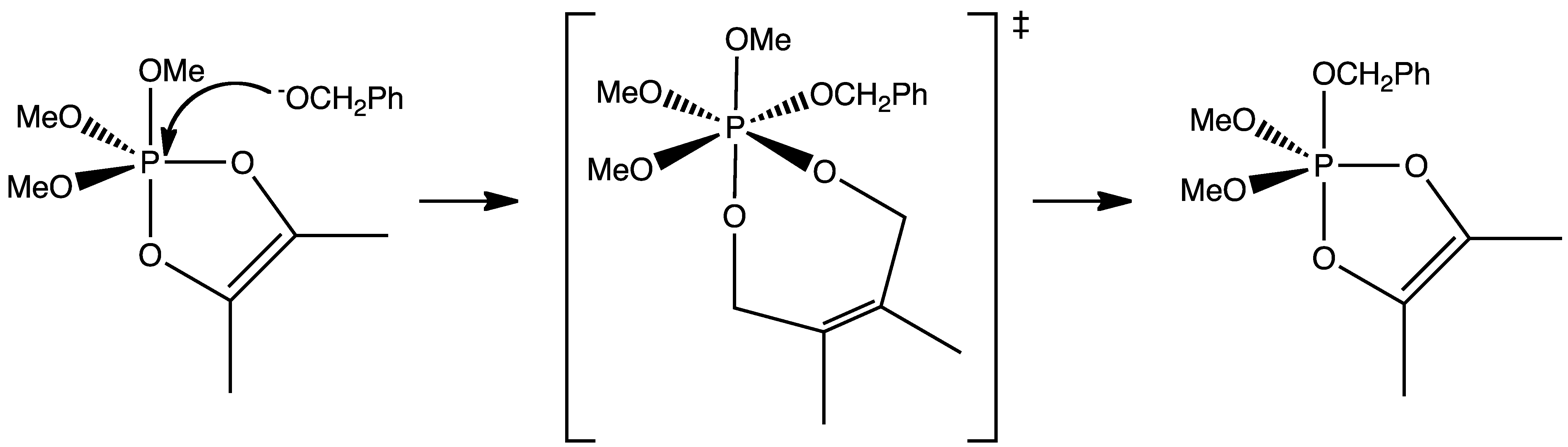
Mechanism of the base catalyzed alcoholysis of pentacoordinated phosphorus

It can be understood from these experiments that the increased reactivity observed for hypervalent molecules, contrasted with analogous nonhypervalent compounds, can be attributed to the congruence of these species to the hypercoordinated activated states normally formed during the course of the reaction.

=== Ab initio calculations ===
The enhanced reactivity at pentacoordinated silicon is not fully understood. Corriu and coworkers suggested that greater electropositive character at the pentavalent silicon atom may be responsible for its increased reactivity. Preliminary ab initio calculations supported this hypothesis to some degree, but used a small basis set.

A software program for ab initio calculations, Gaussian 86, was used by Dieters and coworkers to compare tetracoordinated silicon and phosphorus to their pentacoordinate analogues. This ab initio approach is used as a supplement to determine why reactivity improves in nucleophilic reactions with pentacoordinated compounds. For silicon, the 6-31+G* basis set was used because of its pentacoordinated anionic character and for phosphorus, the 6-31G* basis set was used.

Pentacoordinated compounds should theoretically be less electrophilic than tetracoordinated analogues due to steric hindrance and greater electron density from the ligands, yet experimentally show greater reactivity with nucleophiles than their tetracoordinated analogues. Advanced ab initio calculations were performed on series of tetracoordinated and pentacoordinated species to further understand this reactivity phenomenon. Each series varied by degree of fluorination. Bond lengths and charge densities are shown as functions of how many hydride ligands are on the central atoms. For every new hydride, there is one less fluoride.

For silicon and phosphorus bond lengths, charge densities, and Mulliken bond overlap, populations were calculated for tetra and pentacoordinated species by this ab initio approach. Addition of a fluoride ion to tetracoordinated silicon shows an overall average increase of 0.1 electron charge, which is considered insignificant. In general, bond lengths in trigonal bipyramidal pentacoordinate species are longer than those in tetracoordinate analogues. Si-F bonds and Si-H bonds both increase in length upon pentacoordination and related effects are seen in phosphorus species, but to a lesser degree. The reason for the greater magnitude in bond length change for silicon species over phosphorus species is the increased effective nuclear charge at phosphorus. Therefore, silicon is concluded to be more loosely bound to its ligands.

Effects of fluorine substitution on positive charge density

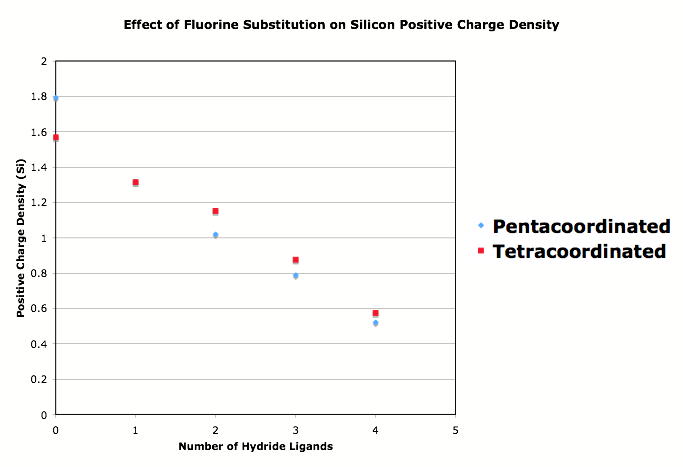
Comparison of Charge Densities with Degree of Fluorination for Tetra and Pentacoordinated Silicon

In addition Dieters and coworkers show an inverse correlation between bond length and bond overlap for all series. Pentacoordinated species are concluded to be more reactive because of their looser bonds as trigonal-bipyramidal structures.

Calculated bond length and bond overlap with degree of fluorination

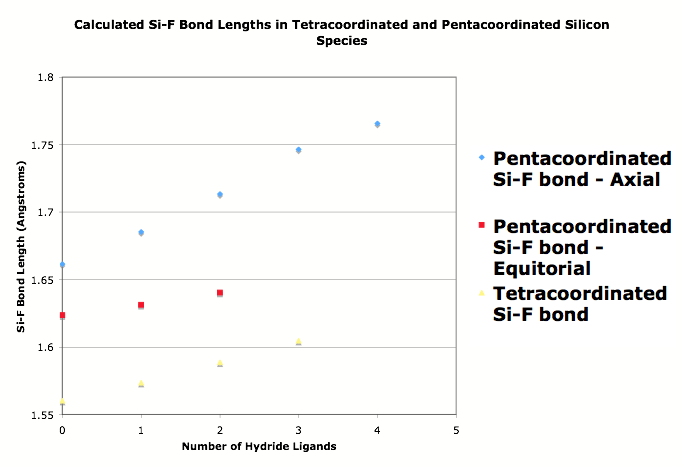
Comparison of Bond Lengths with Degree of Fluorination for Tetra and Pentacoordinated Silicon

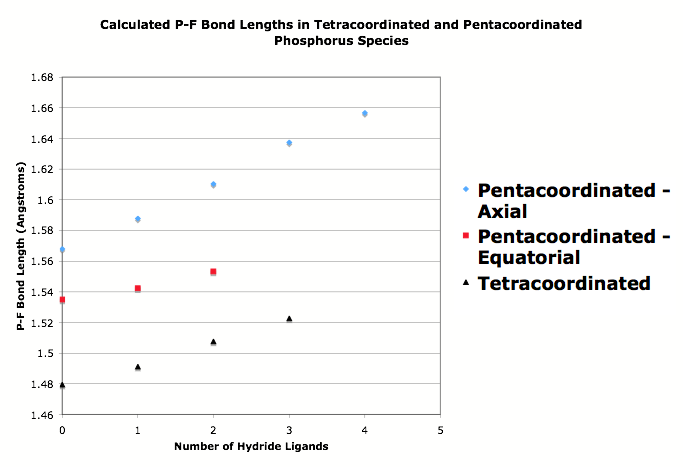
Comparison of Bond Lengths with Degree of Fluorination for Tetra and Pentacoordinated Phosphorus

By calculating the energies for the addition and removal of a fluoride ion in various silicon and phosphorus species, several trends were found. In particular, the tetracoordinated species have much higher energy requirements for ligand removal than do pentacoordinated species. Further, silicon species have lower energy requirements for ligand removal than do phosphorus species, which is an indication of weaker bonds in silicon.

== See also ==
- Charge-shift bond
