= Phosphoranes =

The structure of a typical phosphorane group.

A phosphorane (IUPAC name: λ^{5}-phosphane) is a functional group in organophosphorus chemistry with pentavalent phosphorus. Phosphoranes have the general formula PR_{5}.

Phosphoranes of the type PX_{5} adopt a trigonal bipyramidal molecular geometry with the two apical bonds longer than the three equatorial bonds. Hypervalent bonding is described by inclusion of non-bonding MOs, as also invoked for the closely related molecule phosphorus pentafluoride.

== Examples ==
The parent hydride compound is the hypothetical molecule PH_{5}.

Pentaphenylphosphorane (Ph_{5}P) is stable.

Pentaalkoxyphosphoranes are more common with electronegative substituents. Examples of P(OR)_{5} (R = alkyl), have however been prepared by reaction of phosphites with benzene alkyl sulfenates:

P(OR)_{3} + 2 ROSC_{6}H_{5} → P(OR)_{5} + (SC_{6}H_{5})_{2}

== Wittig reagents ==
Phosphoranes of the type R_{3}P=CR_{2} are more common and more important. Phosphoranes are also considered to be one of the resonance structures of ylides, these compounds feature a tetrahedral phosphorus center including a phosphorus–carbon double bond. These compounds are used as reagents in the Wittig reaction, for instance methylenetriphenylphosphorane or Ph_{3}P=CH_{2}.

== See also ==
- Organophosphorus chemistry
- Phosphane
