= Covalent radius of fluorine =

The covalent radius of fluorine is a measure of the size of a fluorine atom; it is approximated at about 60 picometres.

Since fluorine is a relatively small atom with a large electronegativity, its covalent radius is difficult to evaluate. The covalent radius is defined as half the bond lengths between two neutral atoms of the same kind connected with a single bond. By this definition, the covalent radius of F is 71 pm. However, the F-F bond in F_{2} is abnormally weak and long. Besides, almost all bonds to fluorine are highly polar because of its large electronegativity, so the use of a covalent radius to predict the length of such a bond is inadequate and the bond lengths calculated from these radii are almost always longer than the experimental values.

Bonds to fluorine have considerable ionic character, a result of its small atomic radius and large electronegativity. Therefore, the bond length of F is influenced by its ionic radius, the size of ions in an ionic crystal, which is about 133 pm for fluoride ions. The ionic radius of fluoride is much larger than its covalent radius. When F becomes F^{−}, it gains one electron but has the same number of protons, meaning the repulsion of the electrons is stronger, and the radius is larger.

== Brockway ==
The first attempt at trying to find the covalent radius of fluorine was in 1937, by Brockway. Brockway prepared a vapour of F_{2} molecules by means of the electrolysis of potassium bifluoride (KHF_{2}) in a fluorine generator, which was constructed of Monel metal. Then, the product was passed over potassium fluoride so as to remove any hydrogen fluoride (HF) and to condense the product into a liquid. A sample was collected by evaporating the condensed liquid into a Pyrex flask. Finally, using electron diffraction, it was determined that the bond length between the two fluorine atoms was about 145 pm. He therefore assumed that the covalent radius of fluorine was half this value, or 73 pm. This value, however, is inaccurate due to the large electronegativity and small radius of fluorine atom.

== Schomaker and Stevenson ==
In 1941, Schomaker and Stevenson proposed an empirical equation to determine the bond length of an atom based on the differences in electronegativities of the two bonded atoms.

d_{AB} = r_{A} + r_{B} – C|xA – xB|

(where d_{AB} is the predicted bond length or distance between two atoms, r_{A} and r_{B} are the covalent radii (in picometers) of the two atoms, and |xA – xB| is the absolute difference in the electronegativities of elements A and B. C is a constant which Schomaker and Stevenson took as 9 pm.)

This equation predicts a bond length which closer to the experimental value. Its major weakness is the use of the covalent radius of fluorine that is known as being too large.

== Pauling ==
In 1960, Linus Pauling proposed an additional effect called "back bonding" to account for the smaller experimental values compared to the theory. His model predicts that F donates electrons into a vacant atomic orbital in the atom it is bonded to, giving the bonds a certain amount of sigma bond character. In addition, the fluorine atom also receives a certain amount of pi electron density back from the central atom giving rise to double bond character through (p-p)π or (p-d)π "back bonding". Thus, this model suggests that the observed shortening of the lengths of bonds is due to these double bond characteristics.

== Reed and Schleyer ==
Reed and Schleyer, who were skeptical of Pauling's proposition, suggested another model in 1990. They determined that there was no significant back-bonding, but instead proposed that there is extra pi bonding, which arose from the donation of ligand lone pairs into X-F orbitals. Therefore, Reed and Schleyer believed that the observed shortening of bond lengths in fluorine molecules was a direct result of the extra pi bonding originating from the ligand, which brought the atoms closer together.

== Ronald Gillespie ==
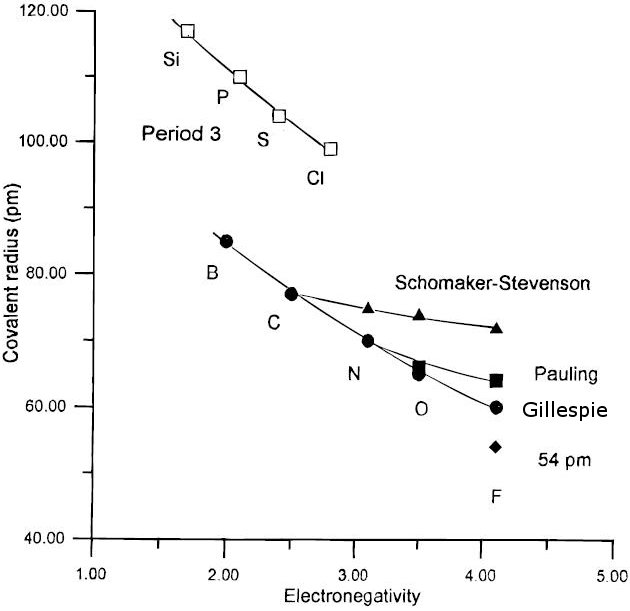
By plotting electronegativity versus covalent radius, Gillespie et al. deduced the value of 60 pm for the covalent radius of fluorine.

In 1992, Ronald Gillespie and Edward A. Robinson suggested that the value of 71 pm was too large because of the unusual weakness of the F-F bond in F_{2}. Therefore, they proposed using the value of 54 pm for the covalent radius of fluorine. However, there are two variations on this predicted value: if they have either long bonds or short bonds.

1. An XF_{n} molecule will have a bond length longer than the predicted value whenever there are one or more lone pairs in a filled valence shell. For example, BrF_{5} is a molecule where the experimental bond length is longer than the predicted value of 54 pm.
2. In molecules in which a central atom does not complete the octet rule (has less than the maximum number of electron pairs), then it gives rise to partial double bonding characteristics and thus, making the bonds shorter than 54 pm. For example, the short bond length of BF_{3} can be attributed to the delocalization of the fluorine lone pairs.

In 1997, Gillespie et al. found that his original prediction was too low, and that the covalent radius of fluorine is about 60 pm. Using the Gaussian 94 package, they calculated the wave function and electron density distribution for several fluorine molecules. Contour plots of the electron density distribution were then drawn, which were used to evaluate the bond length of fluorine to other molecules. The authors found that the length of X-F bonds decrease as the product of the charges on A and F increases. Furthermore, the X-F bond length decreases with a decreasing coordination number n. The number of fluorine atoms that are packed around the central atom is an important factor for calculating the bond length. Also, the smaller the bond angle (<FXF) between F and the central atom, the longer the bond length of fluorine. Finally, the most accurate value for the covalent radius of fluorine has been found by plotting the covalent radii against the electronegativity (see figure). From this, they discovered that the Schomaker-Stevenson and Pauling assumptions were too high, and their previous guess was too low, thus, resulting in a final value of 60 pm for the covalent bond length of fluorine.

== Pekka Pyykkö ==
Theoretical chemist Pekka Pyykkö estimated that the covalent radius for a fluorine atom to be 64 pm in a single bond, 59 pm and 53 pm in molecules where the bond to the fluorine atom has a double bond and triple bond character, respectively.
