= Organobismuth chemistry =

Branch of chemistry

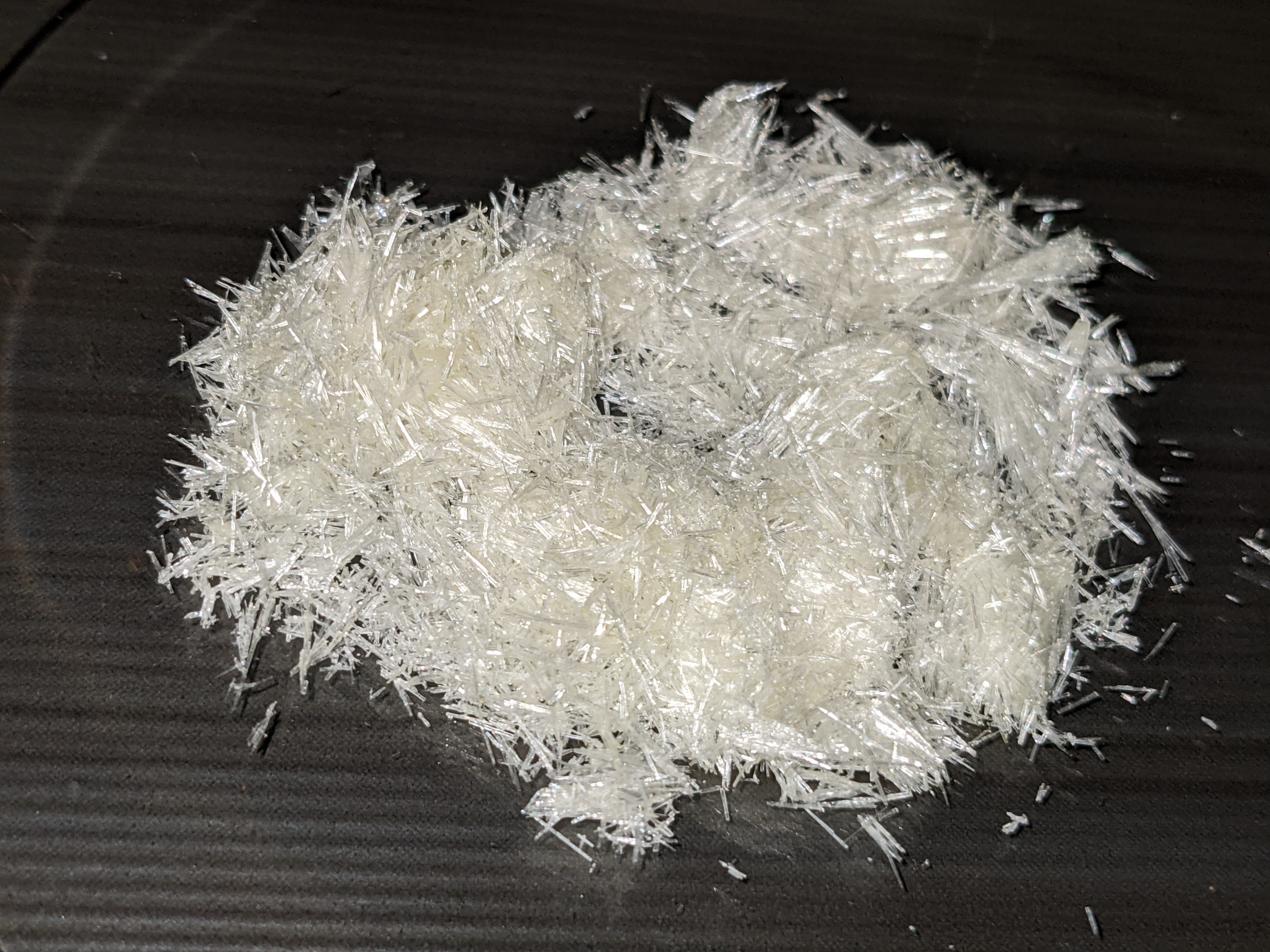
Triphenylbismuth, an example of an organometallic bismuth(III) compound

Organobismuth chemistry is the chemistry of organometallic compounds containing a carbon to bismuth chemical bond. Applications are few. The main bismuth oxidation states are Bi(III) and Bi(V) as in all higher group 15 elements. The energy of a bond to carbon in this group decreases in the order P > As > Sb > Bi. The first reported use of bismuth in organic chemistry was in oxidation of alcohols by Frederick Challenger in 1934 (using Ph_{3}Bi(OH)_{2}). Knowledge about methylated species of bismuth in environmental and biological media is limited.

== Discovery ==
Triethylbismuth, the first known organobismuth compound, was prepared in 1850 by Löwig and Schweizer from iodoethane and a potassium–bismuth alloy. As with most trialkylbismuth compounds, BiEt_{3} has an extremely pungent and unpleasant odor, and is spontaneously oxidized in air. The chemistry of these complexes first began receiving significant attention when Grignard reagents and organolithium compounds became available.

== OrganoBi(III) compounds ==
=== Properties and structure ===
Methylbismuth dichloride adopts a polymeric structure.

Triorganobismuth(III) compounds are monomeric with pyramidal structures reminiscent of organophosphorus(III) chemistry. The halides however adopt hypervalent structures. This trend is illustrated by the sheet-like structure adopted by methylbismuth dichloride.

Most aliphatic organobismuth(III) compounds oxidize easily, with the lighter members pyrophoric. Dialkylhalobismuthines cannot be stored, as they decompose under even inert atmospheres.

Diarylbismuthines are among the most powerful sneezing agents known.

Organobismuth heterocycles are based on Bi(III). The cyclic compound bismole, a structural analog of pyrrole, has not been isolated, but substituted bismoles are known. Bismabenzene has been detected in the laboratory.

=== Synthesis ===
The most general and widely-used methodology for homoleptic trialkyl- and triarylbismuth complex synthesis reacts BiX_{3} with organolithium or -magnesium reagents:

BiCl_{3} + 3RMgX → R_{3}Bi + 3MgXCl
BiCl_{3} + 3LiR → BiR_{3} + 3LiCl.

Triorganobismuth compounds were first prepared instead from K_{3}Bi and organic halides:

K_{3}Bi + 3RX → BiR_{3} + 3KX.

This method is generally more difficult and produces a lower yield. However, it remained as of 2006 the only method for e.g., (Me_{3}Si)_{3}Bi synthesis.

Triaryl bismuth(III) compounds are typically air-stable crystalline solids, and the substituents will react before the carbon-bismuth bonds under appropriate conditions:

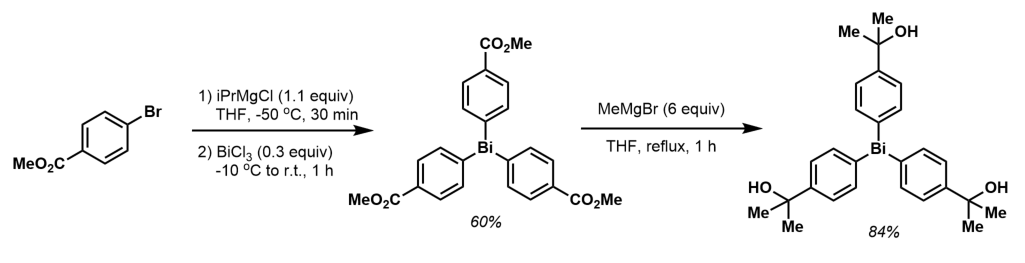

Asymmetric organobismuth compounds proceed most naturally from the (unstable) organobismuth halides RBiX_{2} and R_{2}BiX.

=== Reactions ===
In industry, triarylbismuth compounds catalyze various alkene and alkyne polymerizations.

Triarylbismuth compounds have very limited use in organic synthesis. Their bonds are weak, and easily displaced by other elements, metallic or nonmetallic. Such reactions proceed more readily than for the lighter congeners. Triphenylbismuth undergoes redistribution with its trihalide to give the mixed derivatives such as diphenylbismuth chloride (Ph_{2}BiCl). Bismuth(III) reagents can transfer substituents to thallium(III) compounds:

Bi(CH_{2}=CMe)_{3} + 3 TlCl_{3} → (CH_{2}=CMe)_{2}TlCl + 2 BiCl_{3} at −40 °C

Triarylbismuth(III) compounds may also be employed in C–N and C–C bond-forming transformations with an appropriate metal co-catalyst. For instance, Barton and coworkers demonstrated that amines could be N-arylated with a bismuth(III) reagent in the presence of copper(II) salt.

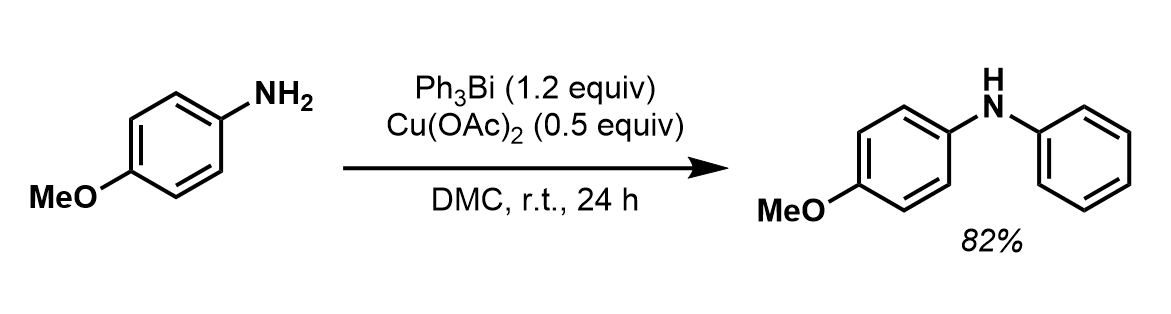

Likewise acylchlorides react under Pd(0) catalysis to form a variety of phenyl ketones. Although not formally arenes, tricyclopropylbismuth(III) reagents react with aryl halides and triflates under Pd(0) catalysis in a similar fashion to afford a variety of aryl and heteroaryl cyclopropanes:

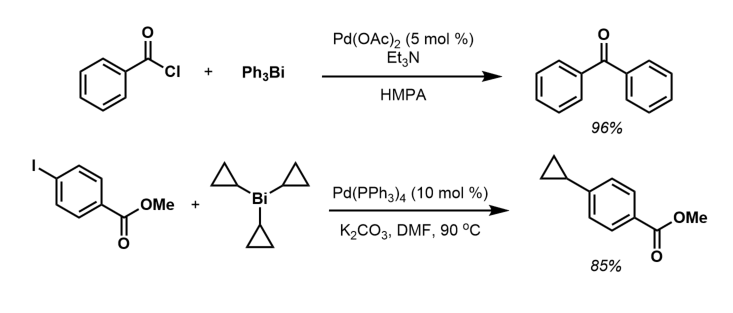

== OrganoBi(V) compounds ==
=== Structure and stability ===
The thermal stability of R_{5}M compounds decrease in the order As > Sb > Bi. The aryl compounds are more stable than alkyl compounds. Me_{5}Bi decomposes explosively at 20°C.

The nature of the aryl ligands is important in determining whether the complex's geometry is trigonal bipyramidal or square planar and its color. In general, homoleptic compounds of the type Ar_{5}Bi adopt square pyramidal structures. The pentaphenyl compound is deeply colored and thermochromic, possibly because of equilibration between geometries.

Carboxylates rarely form chelating complexes of bismuth. Instead, organobismuth carboxylates are typically polymeric, with each oxygen on the carboxylate coordinating to a different bismuth atom. The same is not true for xanthates.

Bismuth halides coordinated to arenes are piano-stool complexes.

=== Synthesis from bismuth(III) compounds ===
Interestingly, although very few inorganic Bi^{V} compounds are known, there is a wide variety of pentacoordinate organobismuth complexes. Triarylorganobismuth complexes easily oxidize to bismuth(V) complexes when treated with chlorine or bromine, giving Ar_{3}BiX_{2} (X = Cl, Br). Reactions with iodine instead displace ligands to give tricoordinate Ar_{3−x}BiI_{x}, whilst reactions with fluorine are too vigorous for control.

All-carbon organobismuth(V) complexes may then be accessed from displacement of the newly formed bismuth-halogen bond with an alkyl or aryl lithium or Grignard reagent. For example:

Me_{3}Bi + SO_{2}Cl_{2} → Me_{3}BiCl_{2} + SO_{2}
Me_{3}BiCl_{2} + 2 MeLi → Me_{5}Bi + 2 LiCl

Unstable, purple Ph_{5}Bi was the first to be synthesized so.

Bi(V) easily forms an onium ion for example by protonation with p-toluenesulfonic acid:

Ph_{5}Bi + HO_{3}SAr → Ph_{4}Bi^{+}[O_{3}SAr^{−}]

Pentaphenylbismuth forms an ate complex upon treatment with phenyl lithium:

Ph_{5}Bi + PhLi → Li^{+}[Ph_{6}Bi^{−}]

=== In organic synthesis ===
Organobismuth(V) reagents are useful for a wide variety of organic transformations. Compared to their lighter congeners, Bi(V) compounds are strong oxidants, dehydrogenating alcohols of all kinds to the carbonyl and cleaving glycols to the aldehyde. They also engage in aryl transfers.

The compounds Ph_{3}Bi(OOtBu)_{2}, Ph_{3}BiCO_{3} and (Ph_{3}BiCl)_{2}O have been investigated for oxime, thiol, phenol, and phosphine oxidation. In general, oxidation accelerates when the aryl ligands have electron-withdrawing substituents, and attacks alcohols before thiols or selenides. Hydrazines dehydrogenate to azo compounds and thiols to a mixture of sulfides and disulfides. High yields require strongly basic conditions (absent it, the carbonate is the most effective), suggesting that the active species are triarylbismuth oxides. However, pentaarylbismuth compounds will also abstract hydrogen.

In general, bismuth(V) compounds arylate inefficiently, transferring only one of the five ligands to the substrate and leaving behind a triarylbismuth(III) waste. Reoxidizing the Bi^{III} complex to Bi^{V} is hard, and impedes closing a catalytic cycle around this chemistry. Nevertheless, Ph_{5}Bi and Ph_{3}BiCl_{2} do arylate 1,3-dicarbonyls and arenes:

Pentaphenylbismuth arylation

In the reaction, the bismuth(V) reagent loses an aryl group and binds to oxygen. The subsequent arylation and elimination are asynchronous and concerted:

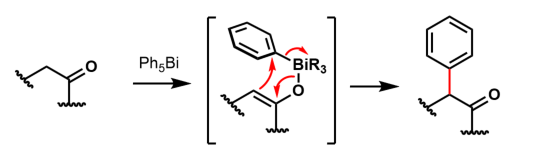

Adjacent electron-pair donors determine regioselectivity.

In the presence of a copper salt, such reagents arylate amines and alcohols. Under ultraviolet light as well, they monoarylate glycols. Steric hindrance governs their high selectivity: secondary alcohols are arylated over tertiary ones, and axial alcohols arylated over equatorial ones.

== Lower oxidation states ==
Bismuthinidene are analogous to carbenes since they have the general form R-Bi, with two lone pairs of electrons on the central bismuth(I) atom. Bismuthinidenes are unstable and very reactive due to the unusual +1 oxidation state but can be used in catalysts.

Organobismuth radicals are slightly more stable, having the form R_{2}–Bi, and a single unpaired electron. If not too sterically hindered, they dimerize.

== See also ==
- Bismuth organometallic chemistry – Bismuth ligands for transition metals
