= Methylbismuth dichloride =

Identifiers
3D model (JSmol)	Interactive image; Interactive image
PubChem CID	20203701
CompTox Dashboard (EPA)	DTXSID301336661
- InChI: InChI=1S/CH3.Bi.2ClH/h1H3;;2*1H/q;+2;;/p-2 Key: ZUPJYXNLGBILSW-UHFFFAOYSA-L
- SMILES: C[Bi](Cl)Cl; C[Bi+2].[Cl-].[Cl-]

Properties
Chemical formula	CH_{3}BiCl_{2}
Molar mass	294.92 g·mol^{−1}
Appearance	yellow solid
Density	4.009 g/cm^{3}
Melting point	242 °C (468 °F; 515 K)
- Except where otherwise noted, data are given for materials in their standard state (at 25 °C [77 °F], 100 kPa). Infobox references

Methylbismuth dichloride is the organobismuth compound with the formula CH_{3}BiCl_{2}. It is a pale yellow solid. The compound can be prepared in two steps from diphenylbismuth chloride, first by methylation with methylmagnesium chloride. Treatment of the resulting methyldiphenylbismuthine with hydrogen chloride cleaves the two phenyl-bismuth bonds.

The compound adopts a two-dimensional polymeric structure wherein each square pyramidal Bi center is bound to four chloride ligands and an apical methyl group. The bismuth centers are interconnected by doubly bridged chloride centers.
