= 1,2-Bis(dimethylarsino)benzene =

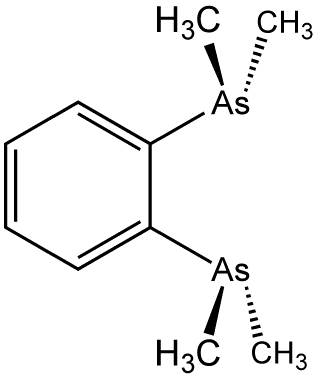
- Stereo, Kekulé, skeletal formula of 1,2-bis(dimethylarsino)benzene with some implicit hydrogens shown

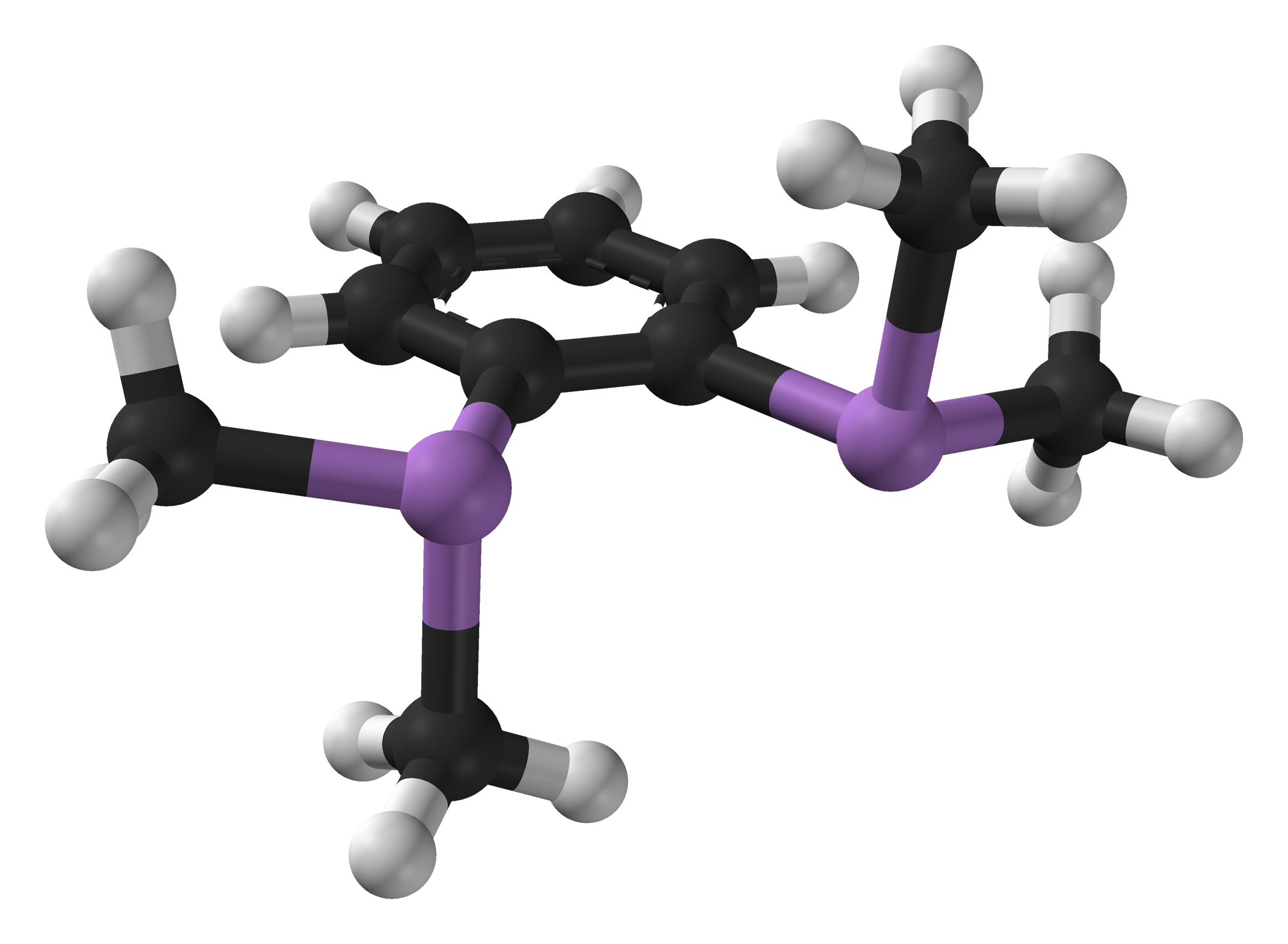
- Ball and stick model of 1,2-bis(dimethylarsino)benzene

Names
- Preferred IUPAC name (1,2-Phenylene)bis(dimethylarsane)

Identifiers
CAS Number	13246-32-7
3D model (JSmol)	Interactive image; Interactive image
Abbreviations	DAS, Diars
Beilstein Reference	2937031
ChEBI	CHEBI:30628
ChemSpider	75125
ECHA InfoCard	100.032.920
EC Number	236-227-9
Gmelin Reference	3780
MeSH	2-Phenylene-bis-dimethylarsine
PubChem CID	83261
UNII	K3C0GW5M57
CompTox Dashboard (EPA)	DTXSID50157593
- InChI: InChI=1S/C10H16As2/c1-11(2)9-7-5-6-8-10(9)12(3)4/h5-8H,1-4H3 Key: HUBWRAMPQVYBRS-UHFFFAOYSA-N; InChI=1/C10H16As2/c1-11(2)9-7-5-6-8-10(9)12(3)4/h5-8H,1-4H3 Key: HUBWRAMPQVYBRS-UHFFFAOYAM
- SMILES: C[As](C)c1ccccc1[As](C)C; C[As](C)C1=CC=CC=C1[As](C)C

Properties
Chemical formula	C_{10}As_{2}H_{16}
Molar mass	286.0772 g mol^{−1}
Appearance	Colourless liquid
Density	1.3992 g cm^{−3}
Boiling point	97 to 101 °C (207 to 214 °F; 370 to 374 K) at 150 Pa

Hazards
- Occupational safety and health (OHS/OSH)
Main hazards	Toxic
- Except where otherwise noted, data are given for materials in their standard state (at 25 °C [77 °F], 100 kPa). verify (what is ?) Infobox references

1,2-Bis(dimethylarsino)benzene (diars) is the organoarsenic compound with the formula C_{6}H_{4}(As(CH_{3})_{2})_{2}. The molecule consists of two dimethylarsino groups attached to adjacent carbon centers of a benzene ring. It is a chelating ligand in coordination chemistry. This colourless oil is commonly abbreviated "diars."

== Coordination chemistry ==
Related, but non-chelating organoarsenic ligands include triphenylarsine and trimethylarsine. Work on diars preceded the development of the chelating diphosphine ligands such as dppe, which are now prevalent in homogeneous catalysis.

Diars is a bidentate ligand used in coordination chemistry. It was first described in 1939, but it was popularized by R. S. Nyholm for its ability to stabilize metal complexes with unusual oxidation states and coordination numbers, e.g. TiCl_{4}(diars)_{2}. High coordination numbers arise because diars is fairly compact and the As-M bonds are long, which relieves crowding at the metal center. In terms of stabilizing unusual oxidation states, diars stabilizes Ni(III), as in [NiCl_{2}(diars)_{2}]Cl.

Of historical interest is the supposedly diamagnetic [Ni(diars)_{3}](ClO_{4})_{2}, obtained by heating nickel perchlorate with diars. Octahedral d^{8} complexes characteristically have triplet ground states, so the diamagnetism of this complex was puzzling. Later by X-ray crystallography, the complex was shown to be pentacoordinate with the formula [Ni(triars)(diars)](ClO_{4})_{2}, where triars is the tridentate ligand [C_{6}H_{4}As(CH_{3})_{2}]_{2}As(CH_{3}), arising from the elimination of trimethylarsine.

== Preparation and handling ==
Diars is prepared by the reaction of ortho-dichlorobenzene and sodium dimethylarsenide:

C_{6}H_{4}Cl_{2} + 2 NaAs(CH_{3})_{2} → C_{6}H_{4}(As(CH_{3})_{2})_{2} + 2 NaCl

It is a colorless liquid. Oxygen converts diars to the dioxide, C_{6}H_{4}(As(CH_{3})_{2}O)_{2}.
