= Ronald Gillespie =

Canadian inorganic chemist (1924–2021)

Ronald Gillespie FRS FRSC CM
- Born: Ronald James Gillespie; 21 August 1924; London, United Kingdom
- Died: 26 February 2021 (aged 96); Dundas, Ontario, Canada
- Education: University College London
- Known for: VSEPR Theory
- Awards: Fellow of the Royal Institute of Chemistry (1953); Fellow of the Chemical Institute of Canada (1960); Fellow of the Royal Society of Canada (1965); Keith Laidler Award (1966); Canadian Centennial Medal (1967); CIC Award for Chemical Education (1976); Queen Elizabeth II Silver Jubilee Medal (1977); Chemical Institute of Canada Medal (1977); Fellow of the Royal Society (1977); Henry Marshall Tory Medal (1983); Order of Canada (2007)
- Scientific career
- Fields: Chemistry
- Workplaces: University College London; McMaster University
- Thesis: Cryoscopic studies in sulphuric and nitric acids (1949)
- Doctoral advisor: Sir Christopher Ingold
- Website: https://chemistry.mcmaster.ca/gillespie/

Ronald James Gillespie, CM FRSC FRS (August 21, 1924 – February 26, 2021) was a British chemist specializing in the field of molecular geometry, who arrived in Canada after accepting an offer that included his own laboratory with new equipment, which post-World War II Britain could not provide. He was responsible for establishing inorganic chemistry education in Canada.

He was educated at the University of London obtaining a B.Sc. in 1945, a Ph.D. in 1949 and a D.Sc. in 1957. He was assistant lecturer and then lecturer in the Department of Chemistry at University College London in England from 1950 to 1958.

He moved to McMaster University, Hamilton, Ontario, Canada, in 1958. He was elected as a Fellow of the Royal Society of Canada in 1965, a Fellow of the Royal Society of London in 1977, and made a member of the Order of Canada in 2007. Gillespie died on February 26, 2021, at the age of ninety-six in the town of Dundas, Ontario.

Gillespie did extensive work on expanding the idea of the Valence Shell Electron Pair Repulsion (VSEPR) model of Molecular Geometry, which he developed with Ronald Nyholm (and thus is also known as the Gillespie-Nyholm theory), and setting the rules for assigning numbers. He has written several books on this VSEPR topic in chemistry. With other workers he developed LCP theory, (ligand close packing theory), which for some molecules allows geometry to be predicted on the basis of ligand-ligand repulsions. Gillespie has also done extensive work on interpreting the covalent radius of fluorine. The covalent radius of most atoms is found by taking half the length of a single bond between two similar atoms in a neutral molecule. Calculating the covalent radius for fluorine is more difficult because of its high electronegativity compared to its small atomic radius size. Gillespie's work on the bond length of fluorine focuses on theoretically determining the covalent radius of fluorine by examining its covalent radius when it is attached to several different atoms.

== Publications ==
- Chemical Bonding and Molecular Geometry: From Lewis to Electron Densities (Topics in Inorganic Chemistry) by Ronald J. Gillespie and Paul L. A. Popelier
- Atoms, Molecules and Reactions: An Introduction to Chemistry by Ronald J. Gillespie
- Chemistry by Ronald J. Gillespie, David Humphreys, Colin Baird, and E. A. Robinson
- Atoms, Molecules and Reactions: An Introduction to Chemistry with D.A. Humphreys, E.A. Robinson and D.R. Eaton, Prentice Hall, 1994
