= Para-Quaterphenyl =

para-Quaterphenyl

Names
- Preferred IUPAC name 1^{1},2^{1}:2^{4},3^{1}:3^{4},4^{1}-quaterphenyl
- Other names 1,1':4',1'':4'',1'''-quaterphenyl

Identifiers
| CAS Number | 135-70-6 |
| 3D model (JSmol) | Interactive image |
| ChEBI | CHEBI:52240 |
| ChemSpider | 8353 |
| DrugBank | DB12794 |
| ECHA InfoCard | 100.004.740 |
| EC Number | 205-213-4 |
| PubChem CID | 8677 |
| UNII | G8AQM6D0RK |
| CompTox Dashboard (EPA) | DTXSID6059657 |
- InChI: InChI=1S/C24H18/c1-3-7-19(8-4-1)21-11-15-23(16-12-21)24-17-13-22(14-18-24)20-9-5-2-6-10-20/h1-18H Key: GPRIERYVMZVKTC-UHFFFAOYSA-N
- SMILES: C1=CC=C(C=C1)C2=CC=C(C=C2)C3=CC=C(C=C3)C4=CC=CC=C4

Properties
| Chemical formula | C_{24}H_{18} |
| Molar mass | 306.408 g·mol^{−1} |

Related compounds
| Related compounds | biphenyl, terphenyl |
- Except where otherwise noted, data are given for materials in their standard state (at 25 °C [77 °F], 100 kPa). Infobox references

para-Quaterphenyl, or p-quaterphenyl, is a chemical compound consisting of a straight chain of four phenyl groups connected in the para position. It can be considered as next in the series of benzene, biphenyl, para-terphenyl. It is an aromatic hydrocarbon and a chromophore.

One possible use is in scintillation counters where it is dissolved in toluene and glows when subject to beta rays.
