= Triphenylarsine =

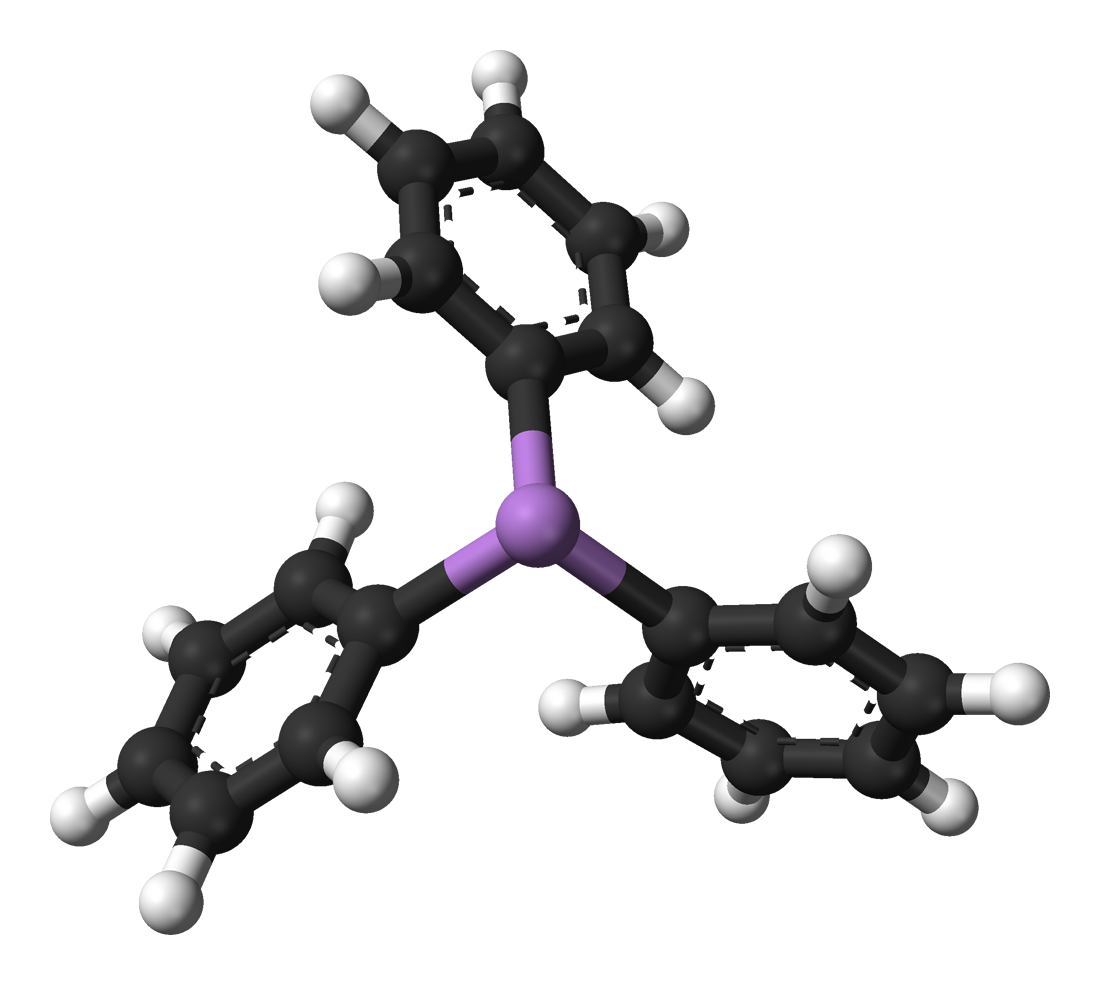
- Ball and stick model of aromatic triphenylarsine

Names
- Preferred IUPAC name Triphenylarsane
- Other names Tribenzenidoarsenic; Triphenylarsine

Identifiers
| CAS Number | 603-32-7 |
| 3D model (JSmol) | Interactive image; Interactive image |
| ChemSpider | 11280 |
| ECHA InfoCard | 100.009.121 |
| EC Number | 210-032-9 |
| PubChem CID | 11773 |
| RTECS number | CH8942500 |
| UNII | MN8EZ3FL74 |
| UN number | 3465 |
| CompTox Dashboard (EPA) | DTXSID4060529 |
- InChI: InChI=1S/C18H15As/c1-4-10-16(11-5-1)19(17-12-6-2-7-13-17)18-14-8-3-9-15-18/h1-15H Key: BPLUKJNHPBNVQL-UHFFFAOYSA-N; InChI=1/C18H15As/c1-4-10-16(11-5-1)19(17-12-6-2-7-13-17)18-14-8-3-9-15-18/h1-15H Key: BPLUKJNHPBNVQL-UHFFFAOYAO
- SMILES: C1=CC=C(C=C1)[As](C1=CC=CC=C1)C1=CC=CC=C1; c1ccc(cc1)[As](c2ccccc2)c3ccccc3

Properties
| Chemical formula | C_{18}H_{15}As |
| Molar mass | 306.240 g·mol^{−1} |
| Appearance | Colourless solid |
| Density | 1.395 g cm^{−3} |
| Melting point | 58 to 61 °C (136 to 142 °F; 331 to 334 K) |
| Boiling point | 373 °C (703 °F; 646 K) at 760 mmHg |
| Solubility in water | Insoluble |
| Solubility | Soluble in ethyl ether, benzene, slightly soluble in ethanol |
| Magnetic susceptibility (χ) | −177.0·10^{−6} cm^{3}/mol |

Structure
| Crystal structure | Triclinic |

Hazards
- GHS labelling
| Pictograms | (GHS06: Toxic) (GHS09: Environmental hazard) |
| Signal word | Danger |
| Hazard statements | H301, H331, H410 |
| Precautionary statements | P261, P264, P270, P271, P273, P301+P310, P304+P340, P311, P321, P330, P391, P403+P233, P405, P501 |

Related compounds
| Related organoarsanes | Trimethylarsine |
| Related compounds | Triphenylamine Triphenylborane; Triphenylphosphine; Triphenylstibine |
- Except where otherwise noted, data are given for materials in their standard state (at 25 °C [77 °F], 100 kPa). verify (what is ?) Infobox references

Triphenylarsine is the chemical compound with the formula As(C_{6}H_{5})_{3}. This organoarsenic compound, often abbreviated AsPh_{3}, is a colorless crystalline solid that is used as a ligand and a reagent in coordination chemistry and organic synthesis. The molecule is pyramidal with As-C distances of 1.942–1.956 Å and C-As-C angles of 99.6–100.5°.

== Preparation ==
Triphenylarsine is prepared by treating phenyl lithium with arsenic tribromide. The method can be used to prepare many analogues with diverse aryl groups.

Triphenylarsine can also be prepared by the Wurtz-like reaction of arsenic trichloride with chlorobenzene using sodium as the reducing agent:

AsCl_{3} + 3 PhCl + 6 Na → AsPh_{3} + 6 NaCl

== Reactions ==
Reaction of triphenylarsine with lithium gives lithium diphenylarsenide and phenyllithium:

AsPh_{3} + 2 Li → LiAsPh_{2} + LiPh

Triphenylarsine is the precursor to tetraphenylarsonium chloride, [AsPh_{4}]Cl, a popular precipitating agent.

Many metal-arsine complexes have been prepared using AsPh_{3}. Examples include IrCl(CO)(AsPh_{3})_{2}, RhCl(AsPh_{3})_{3}, and Fe(CO)_{4}(AsPh_{3}).

Treatment of triphenylarsine with hydrogen peroxide gives triphenylarsine oxide:

AsPh_{3} + H_{2}O_{2} → OAsPh_{3} + H_{2}O
