= Triphenylstibine =

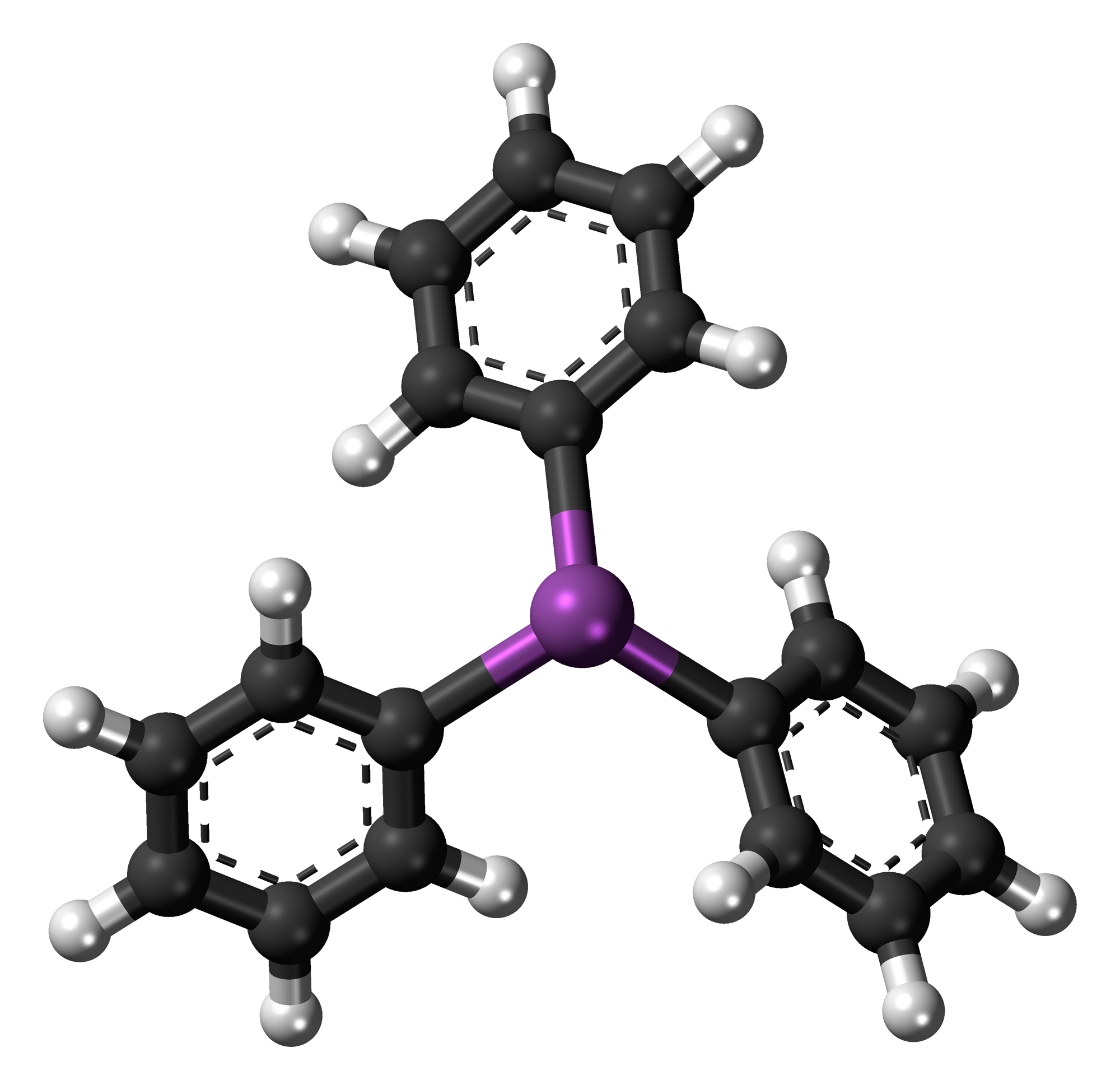

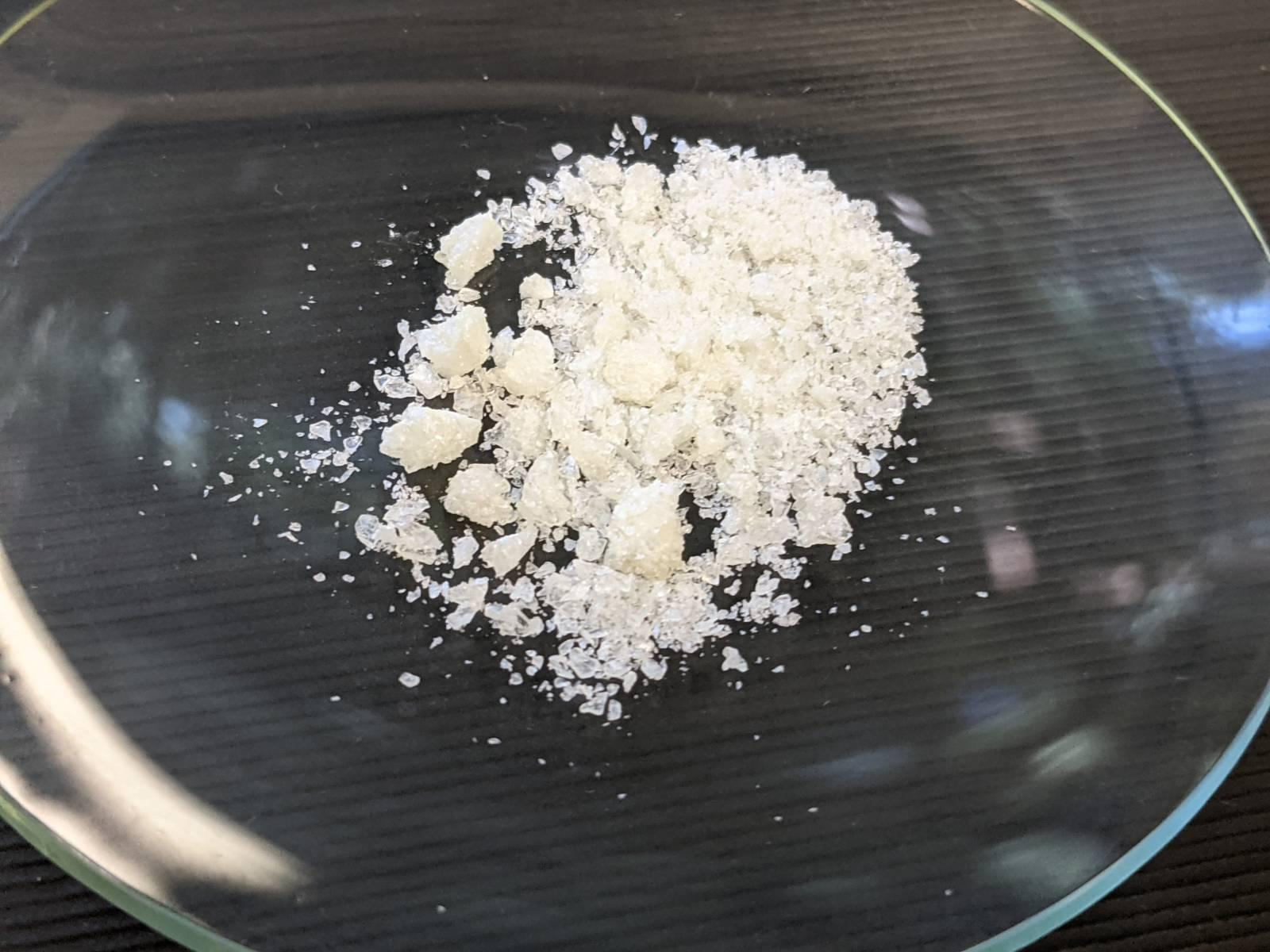

Names
- Preferred IUPAC name Triphenylstibane
- Other names Triphenylantimony

Identifiers
CAS Number	603-36-1
3D model (JSmol)	Interactive image
ChemSpider	11284
ECHA InfoCard	100.009.125
EC Number	210-037-6
PubChem CID	11777
RTECS number	WJ1400000
UNII	G1X1263AMM
CompTox Dashboard (EPA)	DTXSID4052269
- InChI: InChI=1S/3C6H5.Sb/c3*1-2-4-6-5-3-1;/h3*1-5H; Key: HVYVMSPIJIWUNA-UHFFFAOYSA-N; InChI=1/3C6H5.Sb/c3*1-2-4-6-5-3-1;/h3*1-5H;/rC18H15Sb/c1-4-10-16(11-5-1)19(17-12-6-2-7-13-17)18-14-8-3-9-15-18/h1-15H Key: HVYVMSPIJIWUNA-KWOBPOEBAA
- SMILES: c3c([Sb](c1ccccc1)c2ccccc2)cccc3

Properties
Chemical formula	C_{18}H_{15}Sb
Molar mass	353.07 g/mol
Appearance	Colourless solid
Density	1.53 g/cm^{3}
Melting point	52 to 54 °C (126 to 129 °F; 325 to 327 K)
Boiling point	377 °C (711 °F; 650 K)
Solubility in water	insoluble

Structure
Molecular shape	trigonal pyramidal

Related compounds
Related compounds	Triphenylamine; Triphenylphosphine; Triphenylarsine; Stibine

Hazards
- Occupational safety and health (OHS/OSH)
Main hazards	mildly toxic
- GHS labelling
Pictograms	(GHS06: Toxic) (GHS07: Exclamation mark) (GHS09: Environmental hazard)
Signal word	Danger
Hazard statements	H301, H302, H332, H411
Precautionary statements	P261, P264, P270, P271, P273, P301+P310, P301+P312, P304+P312, P304+P340, P312, P330, P391, P405
NFPA 704 (fire diamond)	1
- Except where otherwise noted, data are given for materials in their standard state (at 25 °C [77 °F], 100 kPa). verify (what is ?) Infobox references

Triphenylstibine is the chemical compound with the formula Sb(C_{6}H_{5})_{3}, which is often abbreviated SbPh_{3}, This colourless solid is a common organoantimony(III) compound. It serves as a ligand in coordination chemistry and as a reagent in organic synthesis.

Like the related molecules triphenylamine, triphenylphosphine and triphenylarsine, SbPh_{3} is pyramidal with a propeller-like arrangement of the phenyl groups. The Sb-C distances average 2.14-2.17 Å and the C-Sb-C angles are 95°.

== Synthesis and reactions ==
Triphenylstibine was first reported in 1886, being prepared from antimony trichloride and chlorobenzene:

6 Na + 3 C_{6}H_{5}Cl + SbCl_{3} → (C_{6}H_{5})_{3}Sb + 6 NaCl

In an alternative method, phenylmagnesium bromide is treated with SbCl_{3}.

Upon treatment with antimony trichloride, triphenylstibine undergoes a redistribution reaction:

Sb(C_{6}H_{5})_{3} + 2SbCl_{3} → 3Sb(C_{6}H_{5})Cl_{2}

Stiboranes can be synthesised from triphenylstibine by halogenation:

Sb(C_{6}H_{5})_{3} + Cl_{2} → Sb(C_{6}H_{5})_{3}Cl_{2}

As confirmed by X-ray crystallography, Sb(C_{6}H_{5})_{3}Cl_{2} features pentacoordinate Sb(V) with trans-diaxial chloride ligands.
