= Ate complex =

Salt formed by a Lewis acid-base reaction where the acid atom loses formal charge

In chemistry, an ate complex is a salt formed by the reaction of a Lewis acid with a Lewis base whereby the central atom (from the Lewis acid) increases its valence and gains a negative formal charge. (In this definition, the meaning of valence is equivalent to coordination number).

Often in chemical nomenclature the term ate is suffixed to the element in question. For example, the ate complex of a boron compound is called a borate. Thus trimethylborane and methyllithium react to form the ate compound Li^{+}B(CH_{3})^{−}_{4}, lithium tetramethylborate(1-). This concept was introduced by Georg Wittig in 1958. Ate complexes are common for metals, including the transition metals (groups 3-11), as well as the metallic or semi-metallic elements of group 2, 12, and 13. They are also well-established for third-period or heavier elements of groups 14–18 in their higher oxidation states.

Ate complexes are a counterpart to onium ions. Lewis acids form ate ions when the central atom reacts with a donor (2 e^{−} X-type ligand), gaining one more bond and becoming a negative-charged anion. Lewis bases form onium ions when the central atom reacts with an acceptor (0 e^{−} Z-type ligand), gaining one more bond and becoming a positive-charged cation.

== -ate suffix ==
The phrase -ate ion or ate ion can refer generically to many negatively charged anions. -ate compound or ate compound can refer to salts of the anions or esters of the functional groups.

Chemical terms ending in -ate (and -ite) generally refer to the negatively charged anions, neutral radicals, and covalently bonded functional groups that share the same chemical formulas (with different charges). For example, the nitrate anion, NO^{−}_{3}; the nitrate functional group that forms nitrate esters, −NO_{3} or −ONO_{2}; and the nitrate radical or nitrogen trioxide, •NO_{3}.

Most numerous are oxyanions (oxyacids that have lost one or more protons to deprotonation) and the radicals and functional groups that share their names.

Oxyanions derived from inorganic acids include:

- Fully deprotonated oxyanions, such as borate, carbonate, nitrate, cyanate, isocyanate, thiocyanate, fulminate, aluminate, zincate, silicate, phosphate, sulfate and other sulfur oxoanions, chlorate, titanate, vanadate, chromate, manganate, ferrate, percobaltate, nickelate, germanate, arsenate, selenate, bromate, molybdate, pertechnate, perruthenate, stannate, antimonate, tellurate, iodate, perxenate, tungstate, plumbate, and bismuthate.
- Partially deprotonated oxyanions, such as hydrogensulfate, hydrogenphosphate, and dihydrogenphosphate.

Oxyanions derived from organic acids include:

- Carboxylate ions such as formate, acetate, propionate, butyrate, isobutyrate, and oxalate, along with their sulfur analogs, the thiocarboxylate ions, such as thioacetate.
- Phosphonate and sulfonate ions.
- Deprotonated alcohols such as methanolate (methoxide) and ethanolate (ethoxide), along with their sulfur analogs, the thiolates.

A lyate ion is a generic solvent molecule that has become a negative ion by loss of one or more protons.

The -ate suffix also applies to negative fluoroanions, fluorides which have gained one or more protons and twice as many electrons. Tetrafluoroborate, BF^{−}_{4}, is boron trifluoride, BF_{3}, which has gained one fluoride and two electrons.
