= Dinitrogen difluoride =

Chemical compound

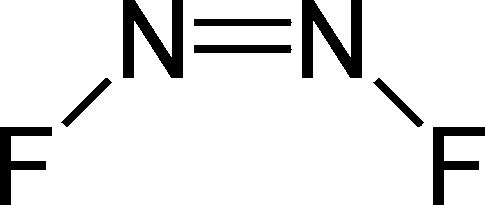
cis-dinitrogen difluoride
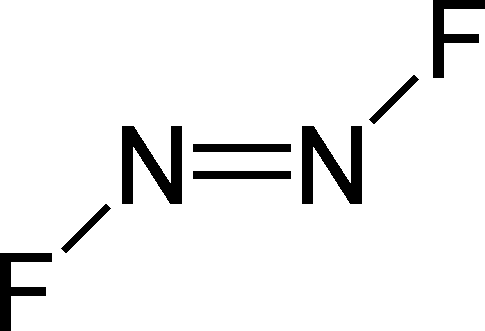
trans-dinitrogen difluoride
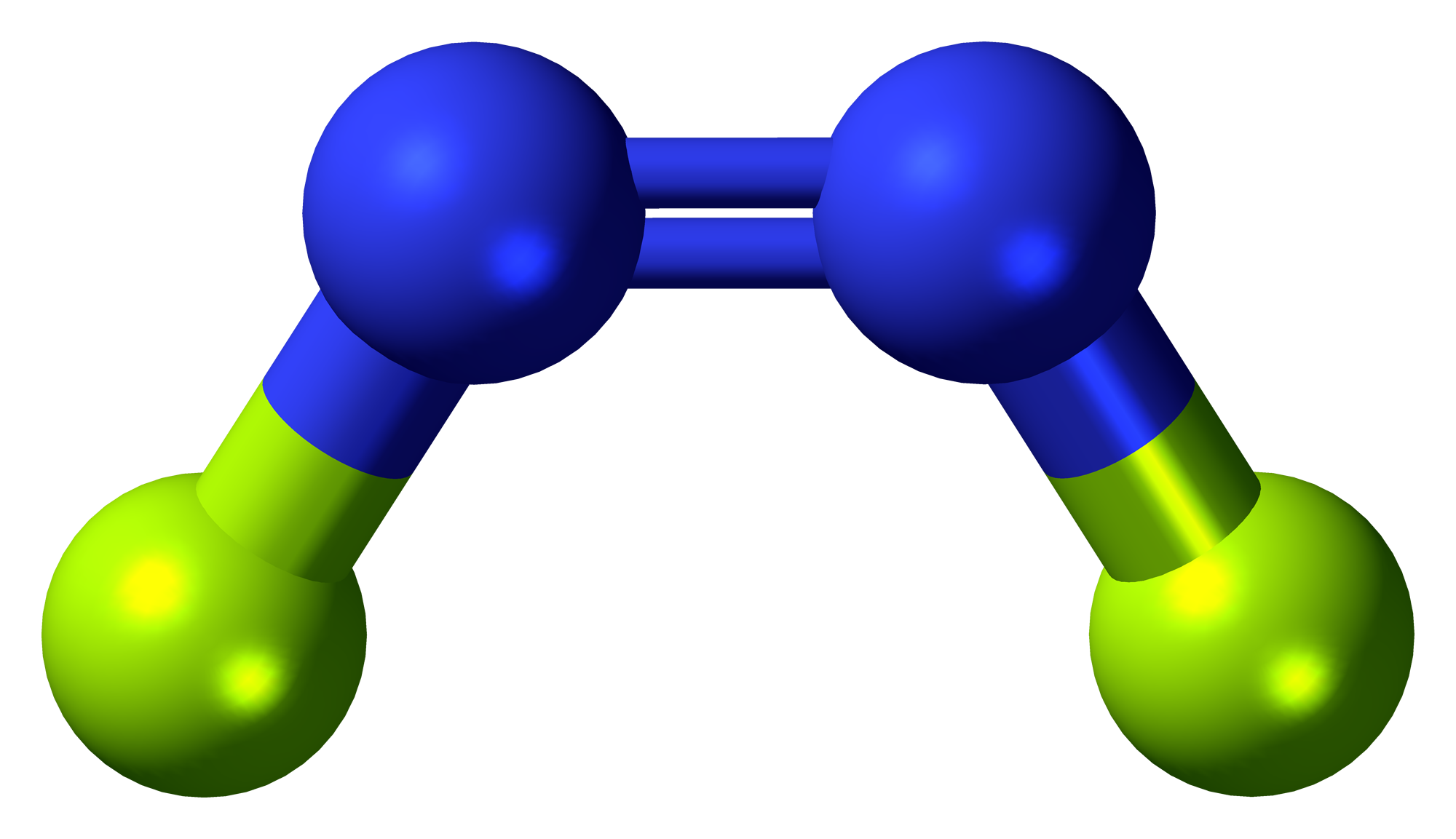

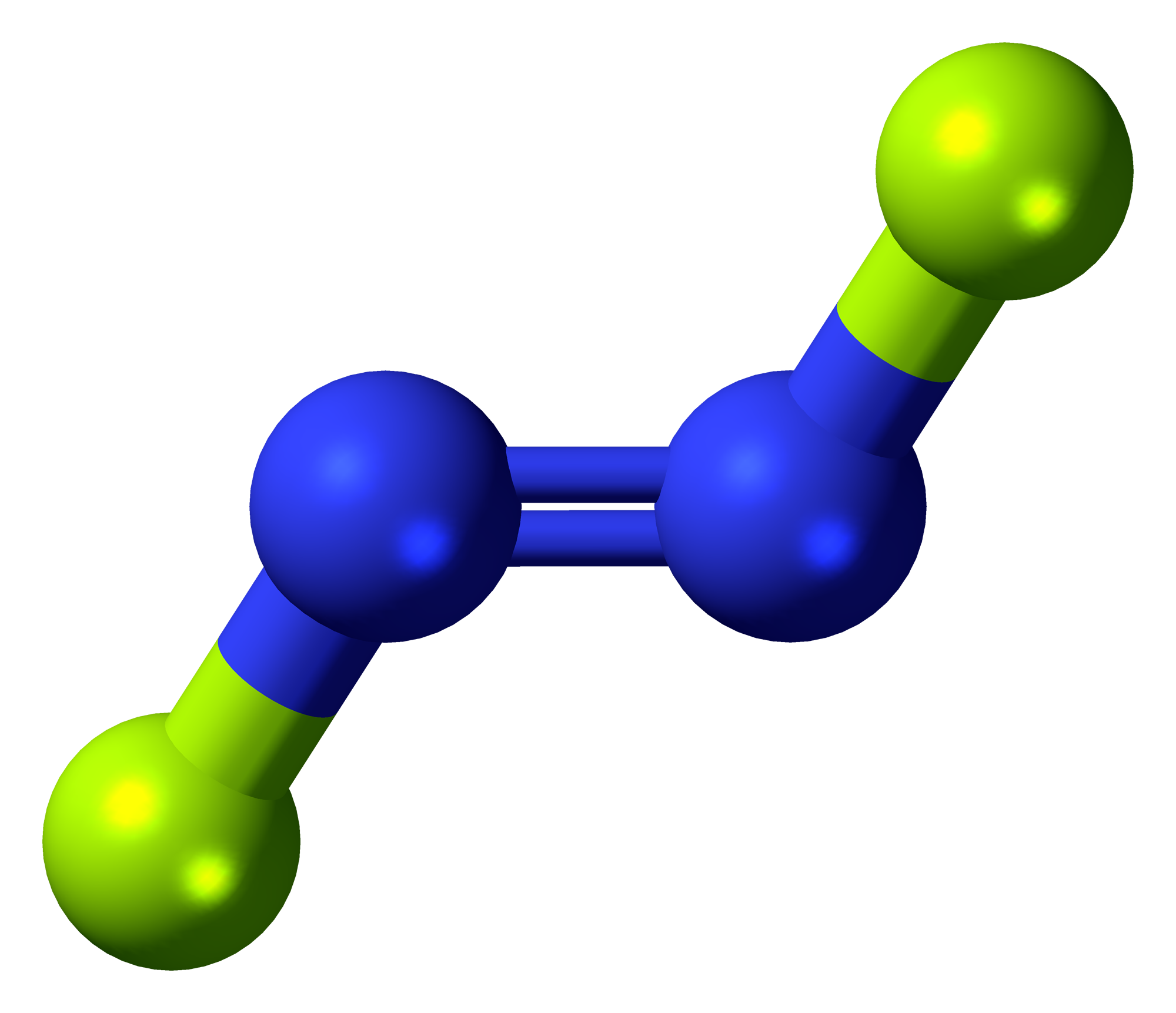

Names
- IUPAC name cis- or trans-dinitrogen difluoride
- Other names cis- or trans-difluorodiazene

Identifiers
CAS Number	13812-43-6 (cis); 13776-62-0 (trans)
3D model (JSmol)	(cis): Interactive image; (trans): Interactive image
ChemSpider	10326121 (cis); 4516471 (trans)
PubChem CID	5364290 (cis); 5462838 (trans)
- InChI: (cis): InChI=1S/F2N2/c1-3-4-2/b4-3- Key: DUQAODNTUBJRGF-ONEGZZNKBY; (trans): InChI=1/F2N2/c1-3-4-2/b4-3+ Key: DUQAODNTUBJRGF-ONEGZZNKBY; InChI=1S/F2N2/c1-3-4-2/b4-3+ Key: DUQAODNTUBJRGF-ARJAWSKDSA-N
- SMILES: (cis): F\N=N\F; (trans): F\N=N/F

Properties
Chemical formula	FN=NF
Molar mass	66.011 g·mol^{−1}
Appearance	Colorless gas
Density	2.698 g/L
Melting point	cis: less than −195 °C (−319.0 °F; 78.1 K) trans: −172 °C (−278 °F)
Boiling point	cis: −105.75 °C (−158.35 °F; 167.40 K) trans: −111.45 °C (−168.61 °F)
Dipole moment	cis: 0.16 D trans: 0 D

Thermochemistry
Std enthalpy of formation (Δ_{f}H^{⦵}_{298})	cis: 69.5 kJ/mol trans: 82.0 kJ/mol

Related compounds
Other anions	Azide
Other cations	Ammonium; Diazonium compounds; Pentazenium; Tetrafluoroammonium
Related compounds	Azo compounds; Diazene; Triazene; Tetrazene; Nitrogen trifluoride; Tetrafluorohydrazine
- Except where otherwise noted, data are given for materials in their standard state (at 25 °C [77 °F], 100 kPa). verify (what is ?) Infobox references

Dinitrogen difluoride is a chemical compound with the formula N_{2}F_{2}. It is a gas at room temperature, and was first identified in 1952 as the thermal decomposition product of the fluorine azide (FN_{3}). It has the structure F−N=N−F and exists in both cis and trans isomers, as typical for diimides.

== Isomers ==
The cis isomer has C_{2v} symmetry and the trans isomer has C_{2h} symmetry. These isomers can interconvert, but the process is slow enough at low temperature that the two can separated by low-temperature fractionation. The trans isomer is less thermodynamically stable but can be stored in glass vessels. The cis isomer attacks glass over a time scale of about 2 weeks to form silicon tetrafluoride and nitrous oxide:

2 N_{2}F_{2} + SiO_{2} → SiF_{4} + 2 N_{2}O

== Preparation ==
Most preparations of dinitrogen difluoride give mixtures of the two isomers, but they can be prepared independently.

An aqueous method involves N,N-difluorourea with concentrated potassium hydroxide. This gives a 40% yield with three times more of the trans isomer.

Difluoramine forms a solid unstable compound with potassium fluoride (or rubidium fluoride or caesium fluoride) which decomposes to dinitrogen difluoride.

It can also be prepared by photolysis of tetrafluorohydrazine and bromine:

N_{2}F_{4} N_{2}F_{2} + byproducts

== Reactions ==
The cis form of difluorodiazene will react with strong fluoride ion acceptors such as antimony pentafluoride to form the linear [N≡N−F]^{+} cation (fluorodiazonium cation) which forms a salt with the formula [N≡N−F]^{+}[SbF_{6}]^{−} (fluorodiazonium hexafluoroantimonate(V)).

F−N=N−F + SbF_{5} → [N≡N−F]^{+}[SbF_{6}]^{−}

Analogous reaction of cis-difluorodiazene with arsenic pentafluoride gives white solid salt with the formula [N≡N−F]^{+}[AsF_{6}]^{−} (fluorodiazonium hexafluoroarsenate(V)).

F−N=N−F + AsF_{5} → [N≡N−F]^{+}[AsF_{6}]^{−}

In the solid phase, the observed N≡N and N−F bond distances in the [N≡N−F]^{+} cation are 1.089(9) and 1.257(8) Å respectively, among the shortest experimentally observed N-N and N-F bonds.
