= Diphosphane =

Chemical compound

Stereo structural formula of diphosphane with explicit hydrogens
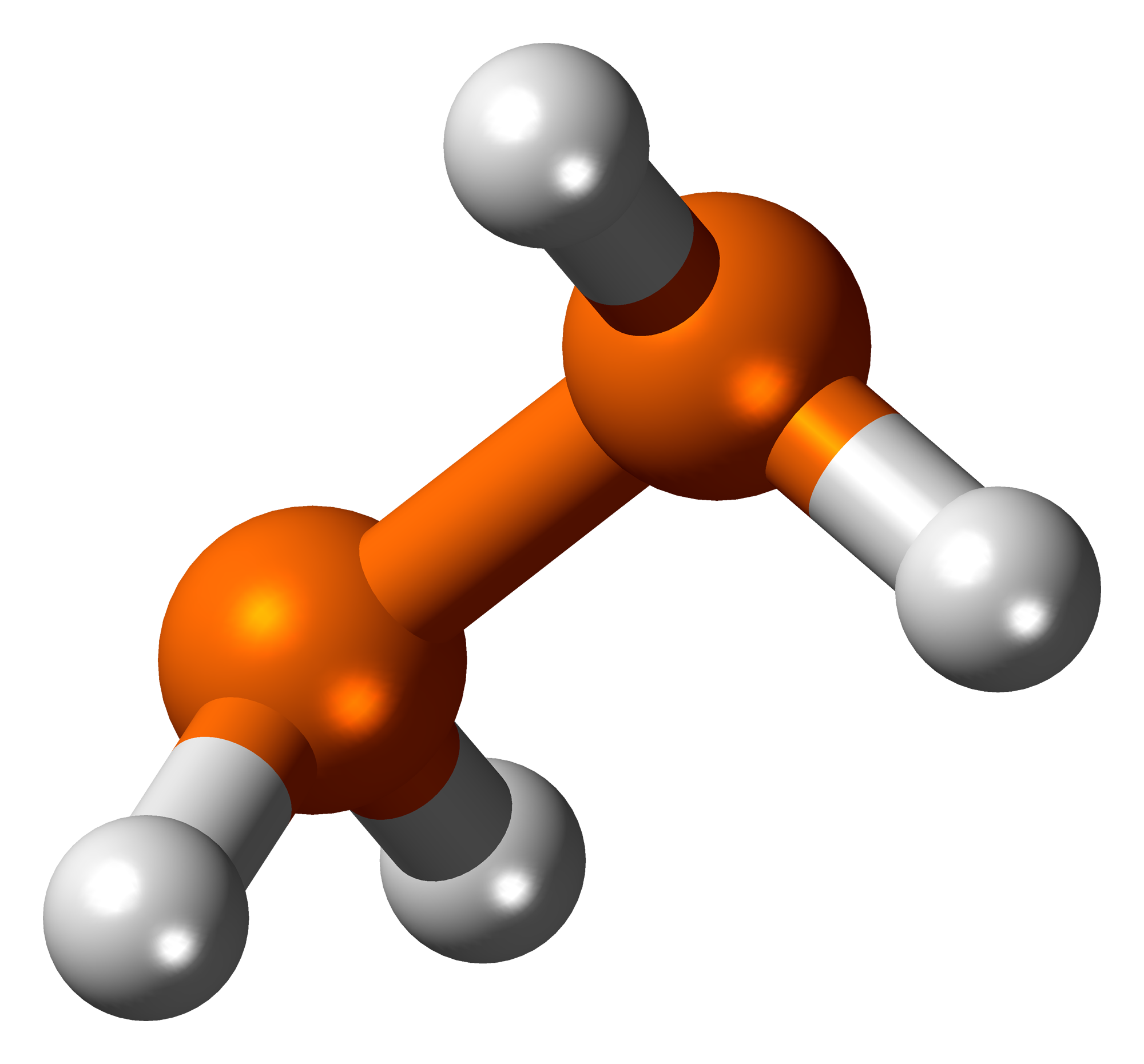
Ball-and-stick model of diphosphane

Names
- IUPAC name Diphosphane
- Systematic IUPAC name Diphosphane (substitutive); Tetrahydridodiphosphorus(P—P) (additive)
- Other names Diphosphine

Identifiers
CAS Number	13445-50-6
3D model (JSmol)	Interactive image
ChEBI	CHEBI:35880
ChemSpider	122832
PubChem CID	139283
CompTox Dashboard (EPA)	DTXSID40924074
- InChI: InChI=1S/H4P2/c1-2/h1-2H2 Key: VURFVHCLMJOLKN-UHFFFAOYSA-N
- SMILES: PP

Properties
Chemical formula	P_{2}H_{4}
Melting point	−99 °C (−146 °F; 174 K)
Boiling point	63.5 °C (146.3 °F; 336.6 K) (Extrapolated, decomposes)

Related compounds
Other anions	ammonia hydrazine triazane
Other cations	diphosphines
Related Binary Phosphorus halides	diphosphorus tetrafluoride diphosphorus tetrachloride diphosphorus tetrabromide diphosphorus tetraiodide
Related compounds	phosphane triphosphane diphosphene diphosphenes
- Except where otherwise noted, data are given for materials in their standard state (at 25 °C [77 °F], 100 kPa). verify (what is ?) Infobox references

Diphosphane, or diphosphine, is an inorganic compound with the chemical formula P_{2}H_{4}. This colourless liquid is one of several binary phosphorus hydrides. It is the impurity that typically causes samples of phosphine to ignite in air.

== Properties, preparation, reactions ==
Diphosphane adopts the gauche conformation (like hydrazine, less symmetrical than shown in the image) with a P−P distance of 2.219 angstroms. It is nonbasic, unstable at room temperature, and spontaneously flammable in air. It is only poorly soluble in water but dissolves in organic solvents. Its ^{1}H NMR spectrum consists of 32 lines resulting from an A_{2}XX'A'_{2} splitting system.

Diphosphane is produced by the hydrolysis of calcium monophosphide, which can be described as the Ca^{2+} derivative of P^{4−}_{2}. According to an optimized procedure, hydrolysis of 400 g of CaP at −30 °C gives about 20 g of product, slightly contaminated with phosphine.

Reaction of diphosphane with butyllithium affords a variety of condensed polyphosphine compounds.

== Organic diphosphanes ==
A variety of organic derivatives of diphosphane are known, but asymmetric diphosphanes are only stable at cryogenic temperatures. Otherwise, the substituents facily redistribute on the phosphorus centers to give a mixture of products. On the other hand, there appears to be a substantial barrier to chiral inversion.

The central bond is weak, and easily adds substituents.

The simplest synthesis method heats a phosphorus halide and a phosphane:

Ph_{2}PCl + HPPh_{2} → Ph_{2}P−PPh_{2} + HCl↑

Alkali metals can replace the hydrogen in that reaction (i.e., a dialkylphosphide), and in some rare cases a dialkylamine can replace the halide. Symmetric diphosphanes are easily prepared by reductive coupling, e.g. tetraphenyldiphosphine from chlorodiphenylphosphine:

2 ClPPh_{2} + 2 Na → Ph_{2}P−PPh_{2} + 2 NaCl

Ultraviolet radiation decomposes mercury(II) dialkylphosphides to the metal and a dialkylphosphane.

The methyl compound P_{2}Me_{4} is prepared by the reduction of Me_{2}P(S)−P(S)Me_{2}, which is produced by methylation of thiophosphoryl chloride with methylmagnesium bromide.

== Historical Note ==
Pure phosphine (PH_{3}) is not pyrophoric at room temperature; its apparent spontaneous combustion in air was historically clarified in 1844 by Paul Thénard, who isolated liquid diphosphane as the pyrophoric impurity responsible for the ignition.

Trace formation of diphosphane alongside phosphine and methane during the anaerobic decomposition of organic matter is frequently cited as the chemical ignition mechanism for marsh gas, producing the flickering natural lights historically known as will-o'-the-wisp (ignis fatuus).

== See also ==
- Pnictogen hydride
