= Pnictogen hydride =

Chemical compound with hydrogen and pnictogen atoms

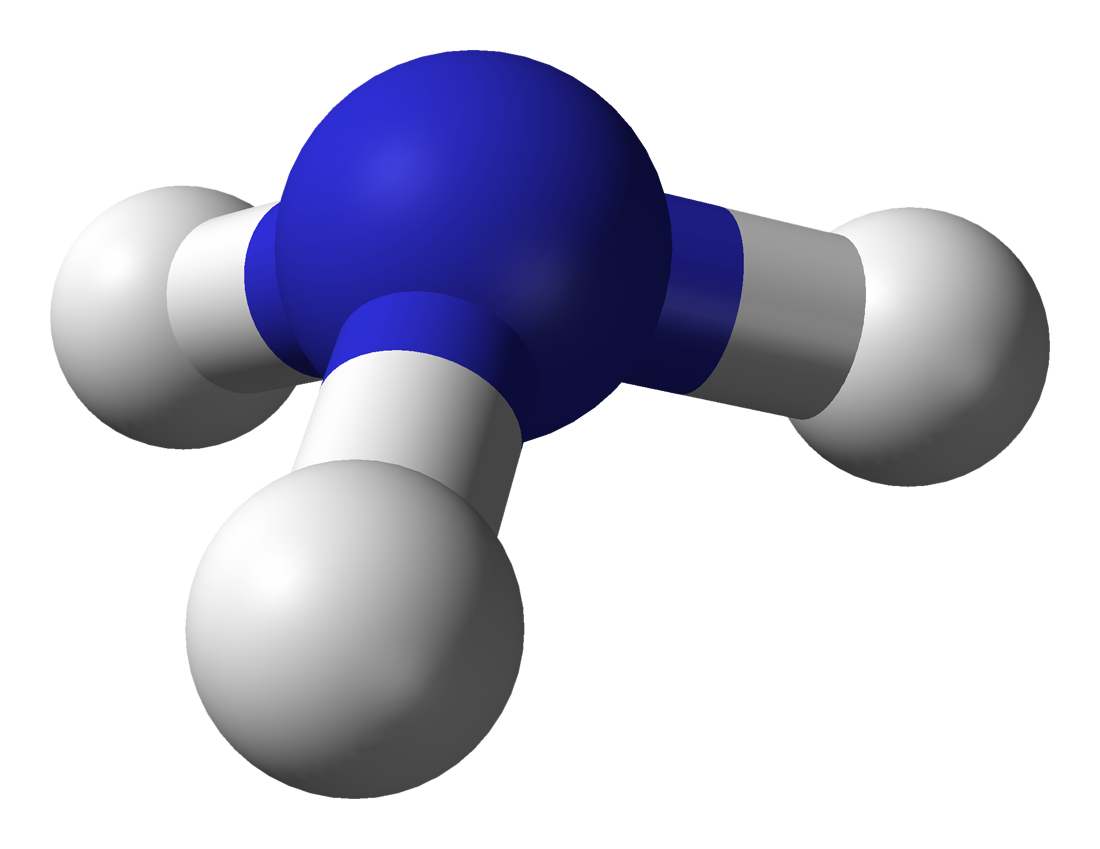
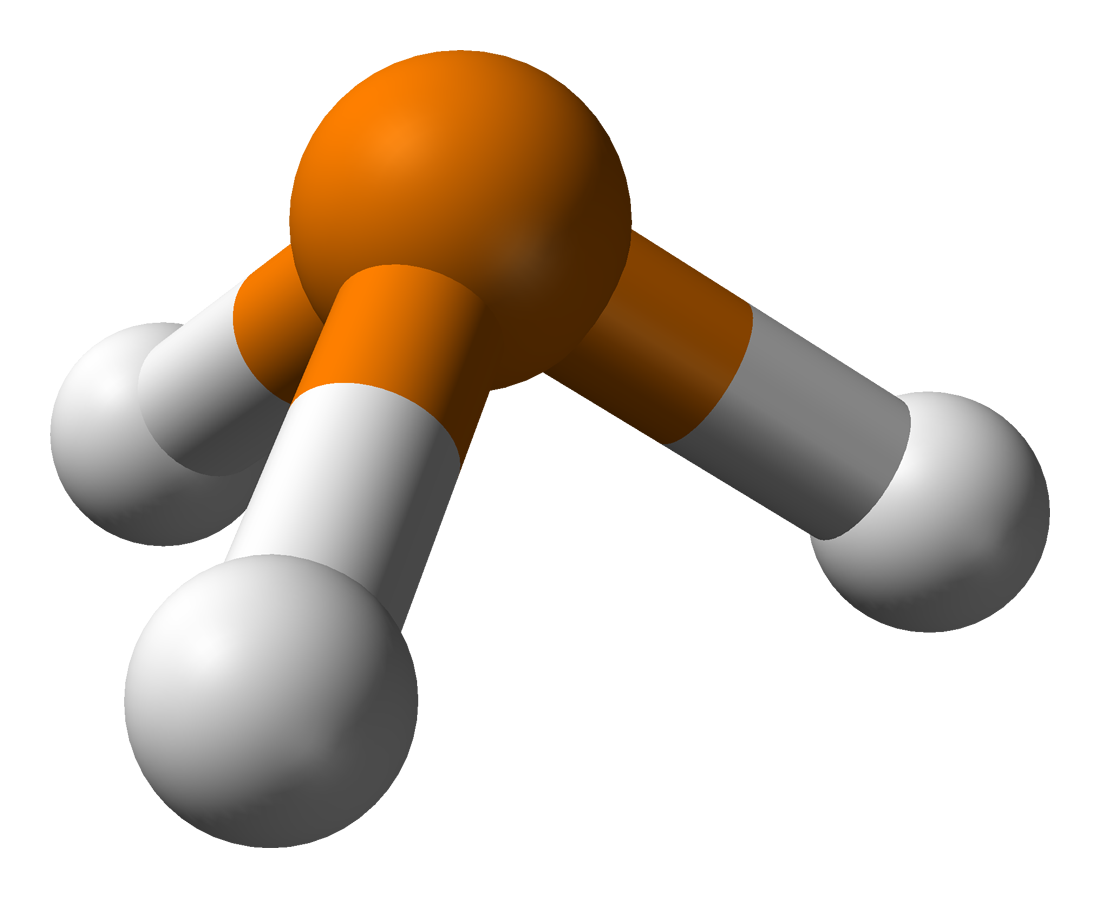

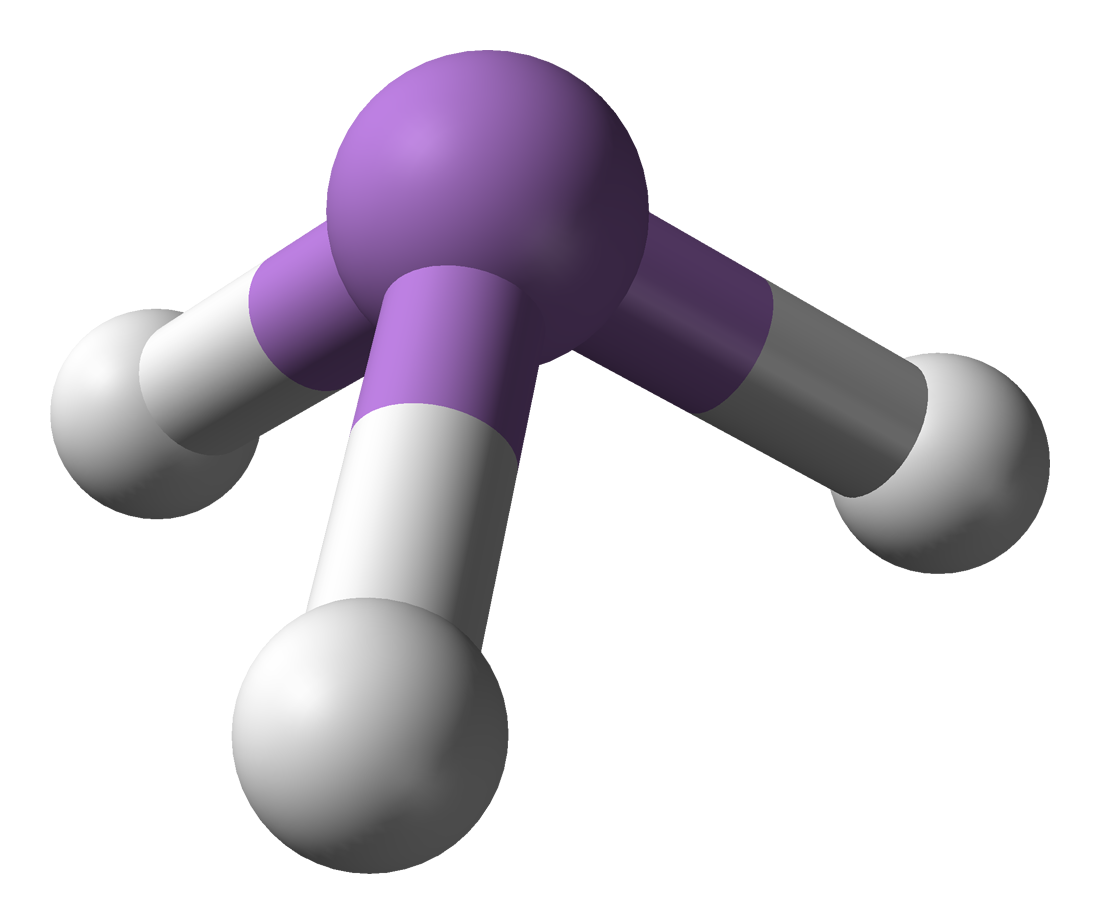
Ammonia, phosphine, and arsine, three simple pnictogen hydrides

Pnictogen hydrides or hydrogen pnictides are binary compounds of hydrogen with pnictogen atoms (elements of group 15: nitrogen, phosphorus, arsenic, antimony, and bismuth).

== Pnictogen trihydrides ==
The simplest series has the chemical formula XH_{3} (less commonly H_{3}X), with X representing any pnictogen. They take on the pyramidal structure (as opposed to the trigonal planar arrangement of the group 13 hydrides), and therefore are polar. These pnictogen trihydrides are generally increasingly unstable and poisonous with heavier elements.

Compound names	Chemical formula	Geometry	Space-filling model
nitrogen hydride hydrogen nitride ammonia (azane)	NH_{3}		
phosphorus hydride hydrogen phosphide phosphine (phosphane)	PH_{3}		
arsenic hydride hydrogen arsenide arsine (arsane)	AsH_{3}		
antimony hydride hydrogen antimonide stibine (stibane)	SbH_{3}		
bismuth hydride hydrogen bismuthide bismuthine (bismuthane)	BiH_{3}		

Some properties of the pnictogen trihydrides follow:

Property	NH_{3}	PH_{3}	AsH_{3}	SbH_{3}	BiH_{3}
Melting point (°C)	−77.8	−133.5	−116.3	−88	?
Boiling point (°C)	−34.5	−87.5	−62.4	−18.4	16.8 (extrapolated)
Liquid density (g/cm^{3})	0.683 (−34 °C)	0.746 (−90 °C)	1.640 (−64 °C)	2.204 (−18 °C)	?
ΔH^{°}_{f}/kJ mol^{−1}	−46.1	+5	+66.4	+145.1	+277.8
Distance (X–H)/pm	101.7	141.9	151.9	170.7	177.59
Angle H–X–H	107.8°	93.6°	91.8°	91.3°	90.48°

These gases have no smell in pure form, instead gaining it when in contact with air. Ammonia has an infamous, intense odour resembling urine or fish, commonly the result of the decomposition of urea. Phosphine, arsine, and stibine smell like fish or garlic.

== Dipnictogen tetrahydrides ==
Dipnictogen tetrahydrides have the chemical formula X_{2}H_{4}. These are generally less stable than the trihydrides, commonly decomposing to the trihydride and the pnictogen involved.

Compound names	Chemical formula	Geometry	Space-filling model
dinitrogen hydride hydrazine (diazane)	N_{2}H_{4}		
diphosphorus hydride diphosphine (diphosphane)	P_{2}H_{4}		
diarsenic hydride diarsine (diarsane)	As_{2}H_{4}		

== Higher derivatives ==
Polyphosphanes exist with the formula P_{n}H_{n+2} (n = 1–9). Linear and branch isomers of P_{4}H_{6} have been detected. Other cyclic and condensed polyphosphane series are known, from P_{n}H_{n} to P_{n}H_{n−18}, amounting to 85 known phosphanes in 1997.

== Properties ==
Noncyclic hydrogen pnictides follow the formula X_{n}H_{n+2}.

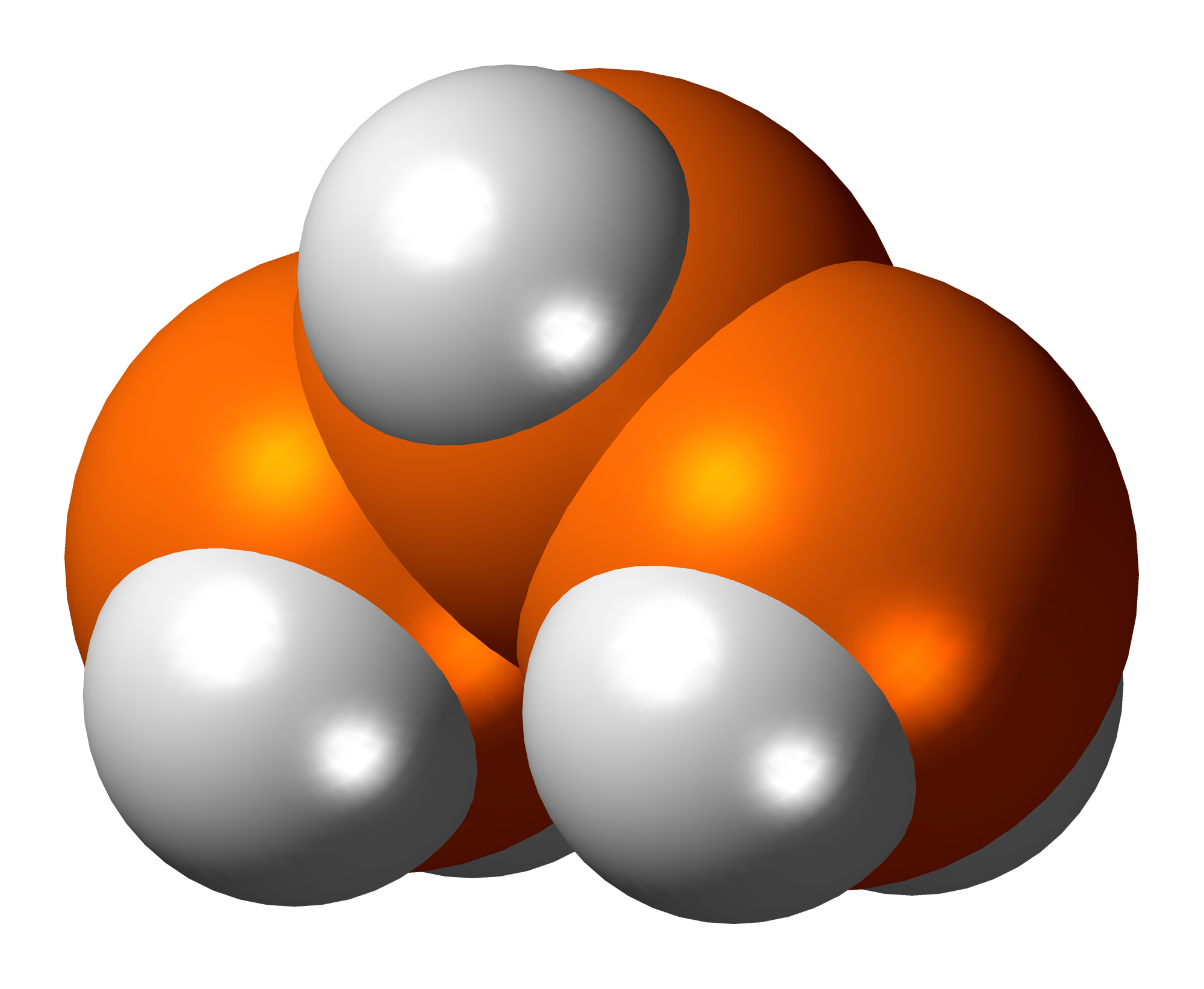

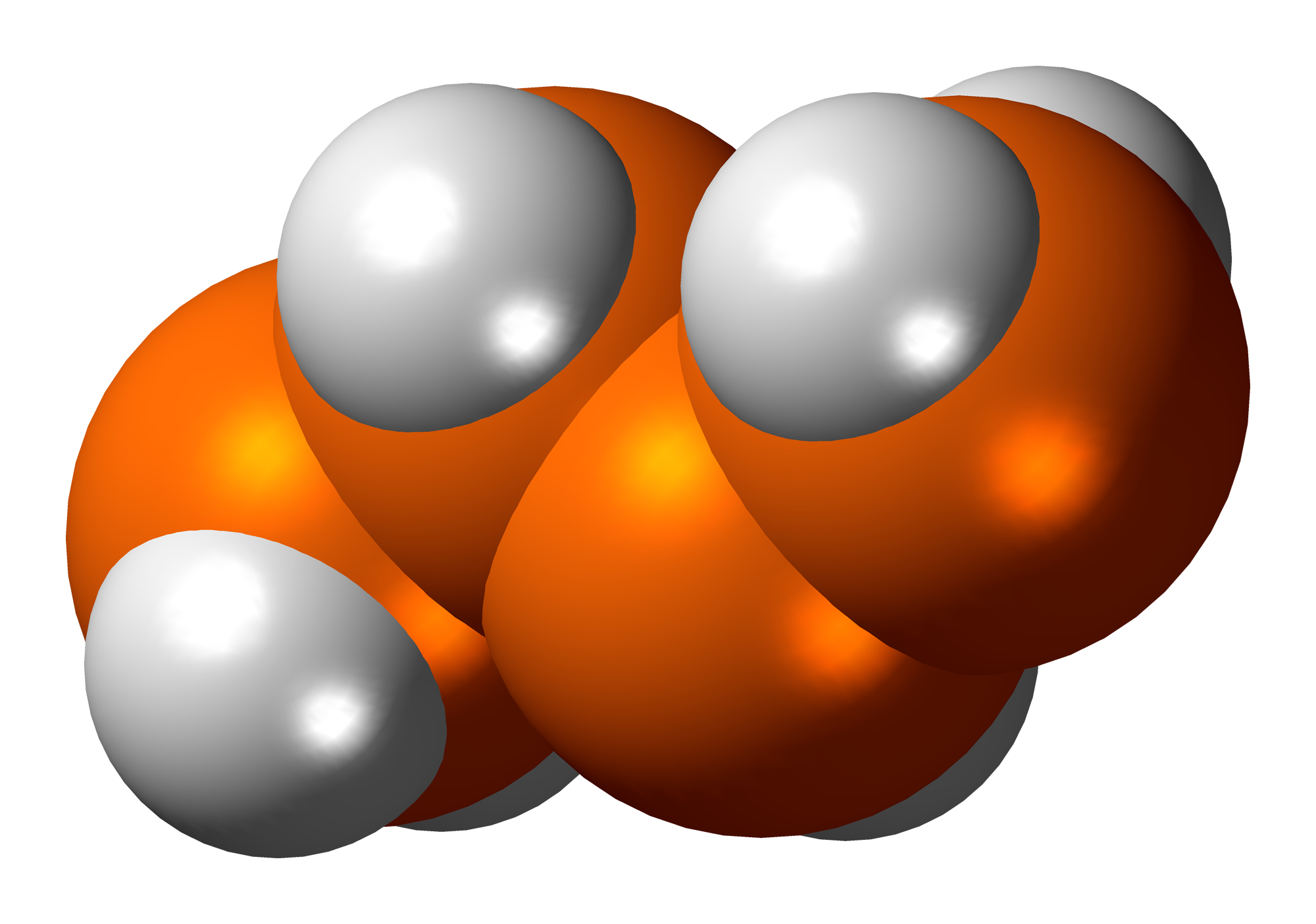
Models of phosphanes of lengths 3 and 4

Ammonia is produced industrially on the largest scale among all compounds. Like water and hydrogen fluoride, hydrogen bonding results in a high melting and boiling point compared to the other pnictogen hydrides, although 26% is lost on melting, another 7% as the liquid is heated to boiling, and the remaining 67% upon boiling. Other effects of hydrogen bonding are a high dielectric constant as well as low values of density, viscosity, and electrical conductivity. Like water, it is an excellent and often-used ionising solvent. Over twenty other hydrides of nitrogen are known, the most important being hydrazine (N_{2}H_{4}) and hydrogen azide (HN_{3}). Hydrazine has physical properties that are similar to those of water: its melting and boiling points are 2.0 °C and 113.5 °C, the density of the solid at −5 °C is 1.146 g/cm^{3}, while that of the liquid at 25 °C is 1.00 g/cm^{3}. The azanes are a series which include ammonia, hydrazine and triazane.

Phosphine, a toxic, colourless gas, is the most stable phosphorus hydride. It is insoluble in water but soluble in organic liquids (as well as carbon disulfide and trichloroacetic acid). Phosphine is a reducing agent.

Arsine, stibine, and bismuthine are highly toxic, thermally unstable, and colourless gases. No appreciable hydrogen bonding is found in phosphine, arsine, stibine or bismuthine, and there is no appreciable tendency to dissociate like ammonia to MH^{+}_{4} and MH^{−}_{2} (M = P, As, Sb, Bi). The pnictogen hydrides become denser down the group and the M–H bond lengths increase, while the H–M–H bond angle decreases slightly. The standard enthalpies of formation reflect the increasing thermal instability going down the group. Arsine decomposes to arsenic and hydrogen at 250–300 °C, stibine to antimony and hydrogen at room temperature, and bismuthine to bismuth and hydrogen above −60 °C. Arsine and stibine are very easily oxidised to arsenic or antimony trioxide and water; a similar reaction happens with sulfur or selenium. Reaction with metals at elevated temperatures leads to arsenides and antimonides. A few lower hydrides are known, such as As_{2}H_{4}, but they are even more unstable and their properties are unknown.

Imidogen, a radical composed of one hydrogen atom and one nitrogen atom (NH), can be classed as a pnictogen hydride.

== See also ==
- Ammonium
- Hydrazoic acid
- Hydrogen halide

== Bibliography ==
- Greenwood, Norman N.; Earnshaw, Alan (1997). Chemistry of the Elements (2nd ed.). Butterworth-Heinemann. doi:10.1016/C2009-0-30414-6. ISBN 978-0-08-037941-8.
