= Diphosphene =

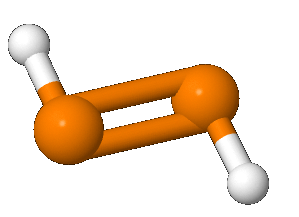
- Ball and stick model of diphosphene molecule

Identifiers
CAS Number	41916-72-7
3D model (JSmol)	Interactive image
ChemSpider	125761
PubChem CID	142559
CompTox Dashboard (EPA)	DTXSID50194680
- InChI: InChI=1S/H2P2/c1-2/h1-2H Key: SWJAOBXRZSMKNS-UHFFFAOYSA-N
- SMILES: P=P

Properties
Chemical formula	P_{2}H_{2}
Molar mass	63.964 g·mol^{−1}

Related compounds
Other anions	diazene
Other cations	diphosphenes
Related Binary azenes	triazene tetrazene
Related compounds	ammonia diazane triazane
- Except where otherwise noted, data are given for materials in their standard state (at 25 °C [77 °F], 100 kPa). verify (what is ?) Infobox references

Diphosphene is a compound having the formula (PH)_{2}. It exists as two geometric isomers, E and Z. Diphosphene is also the parent member of the entire class of diphosphene compounds with the formula (PR)_{2}, where R is an organyl group.

Visible radiation induces cis-trans isomerization, although further irradiation can excite the molecule to a triplet diradical state. In triplet trans-HPPH, the P-P bond length is predicted to be 2.291 Å. It is not only longer than the P-P double bond in ground state trans-bis(2,4,6-tri-tert-butylphenyl)diphosphene, but also longer than that of P-P single bond in H_{2}P−PH_{2}. Calculation of the dihedral angle of trans-HPPH suggests that it is almost 90 degree, which means the formation of $\pi$ and $\pi^*$ P-P bonds is forbidden and σ bond is enhanced.
