= Calcium monophosphide =

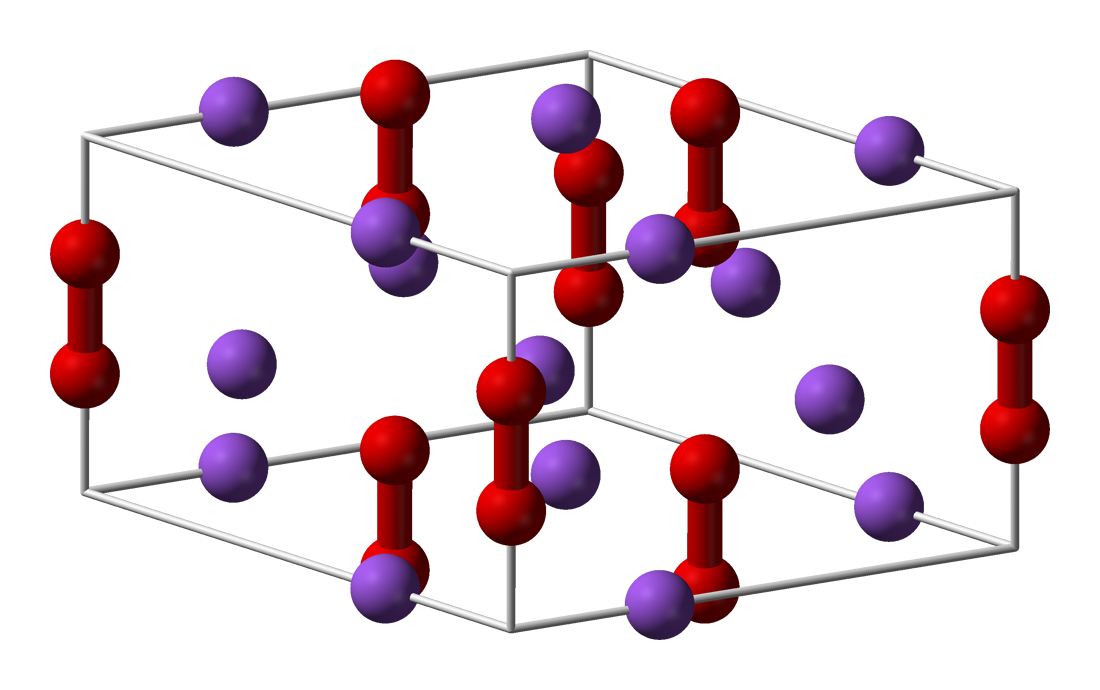

Names
- Other names Calcium phosphide

Identifiers
CAS Number	39373-03-0
3D model (JSmol)	Interactive image
ECHA InfoCard	100.049.465
EC Number	254-431-6
- InChI: InChI=1S/2Ca.P2/c;;1-2/q2*+1;-2 Key: ZNARFUPPJCLHKN-UHFFFAOYSA-N
- SMILES: [Ca+2].[P-2][P-2].[Ca+2]

Properties
Chemical formula	CaP (Ca_{2}P_{2})
Molar mass	71.05
Appearance	black solid
Solubility in water	decomposes

Hazards
- GHS labelling
Pictograms	(GHS02: Flammable) (GHS05: Corrosive) (GHS06: Toxic) (GHS09: Environmental hazard)
Signal word	Danger
Hazard statements	H260, H300, H311, H318, H330, H400
Precautionary statements	P223, P231+P232, P260, P264, P270, P271, P273, P280, P284, P301+P310, P302+P352, P304+P340, P305+P351+P338, P310, P312, P320, P321, P330, P335+P334, P361, P363, P370+P378, P391, P402+P404, P403+P233, P405, P501
- Except where otherwise noted, data are given for materials in their standard state (at 25 °C [77 °F], 100 kPa). verify (what is ?) Infobox references

Calcium monophosphide is the inorganic compound with the formula CaP. It is sometimes also known as "calcium phosphide", which also describes a different compound with composition Ca_{3}P_{2}. Calcium monophosphide is a black solid.

== Structure and properties ==
The structures of CaP and sodium peroxide (Na_{2}O_{2}) are very similar. The solid is described as a salt: (Ca^{2+})_{2}P_{2}^{4−}, or Ca_{2}P_{2}. Since the bonding is ionic, the diphosphide centers carry negative charge and are easily protonated. Upon hydrolysis this material releases diphosphine (P_{2}H_{4}):

Ca_{2}P_{2} + 4 H_{2}O → 2 Ca(OH)_{2} + P_{2}H_{4}

The hydrolyses of CaP and calcium carbide (CaC_{2}) are similar, except that diphosphine spontaneously ignites in air. Thus, CaP must be protected from air.

CaP decomposes to Ca_{3}P_{2} at about 600 °C.

12 CaP → 4 Ca_{3}P_{2} + P_{4}
