= Phosphine =

Chemical compound hydrogen phosphide

- Skeletal formula of phosphine

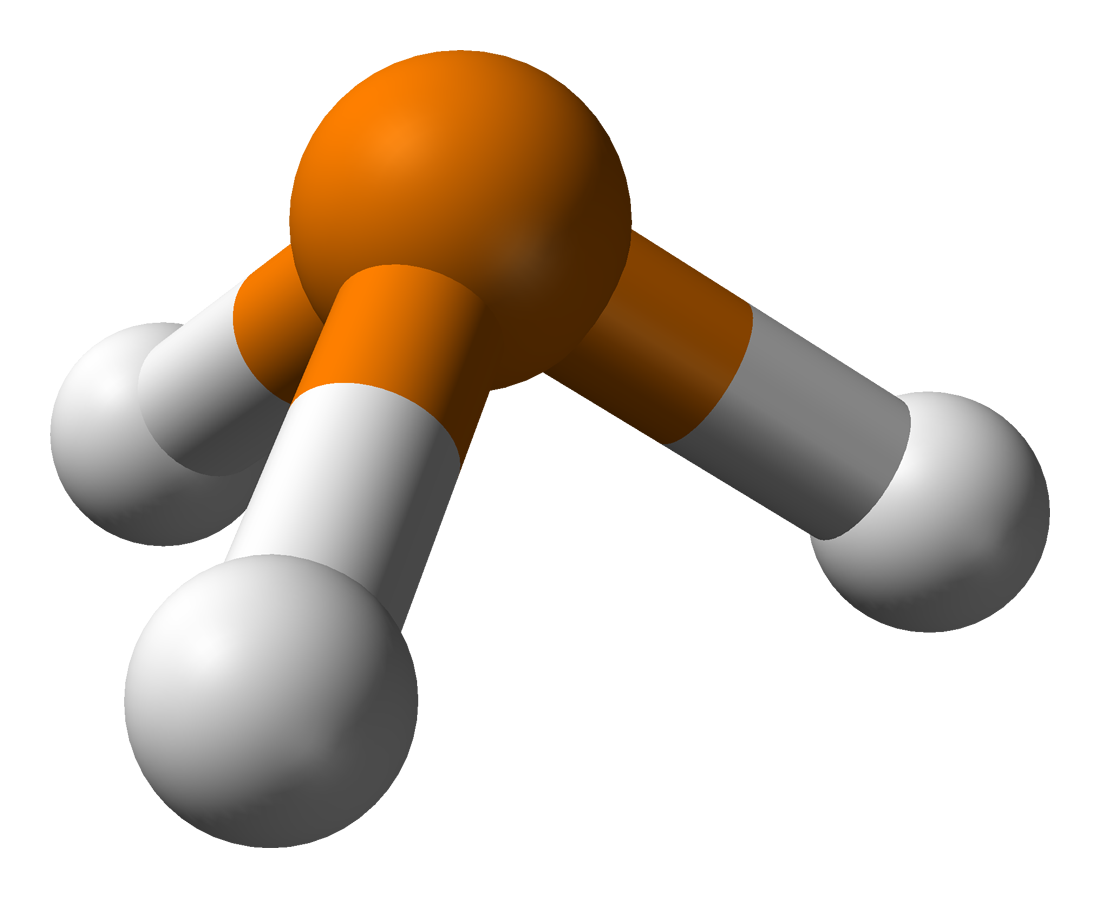
Ball-and-stick model of phosphine
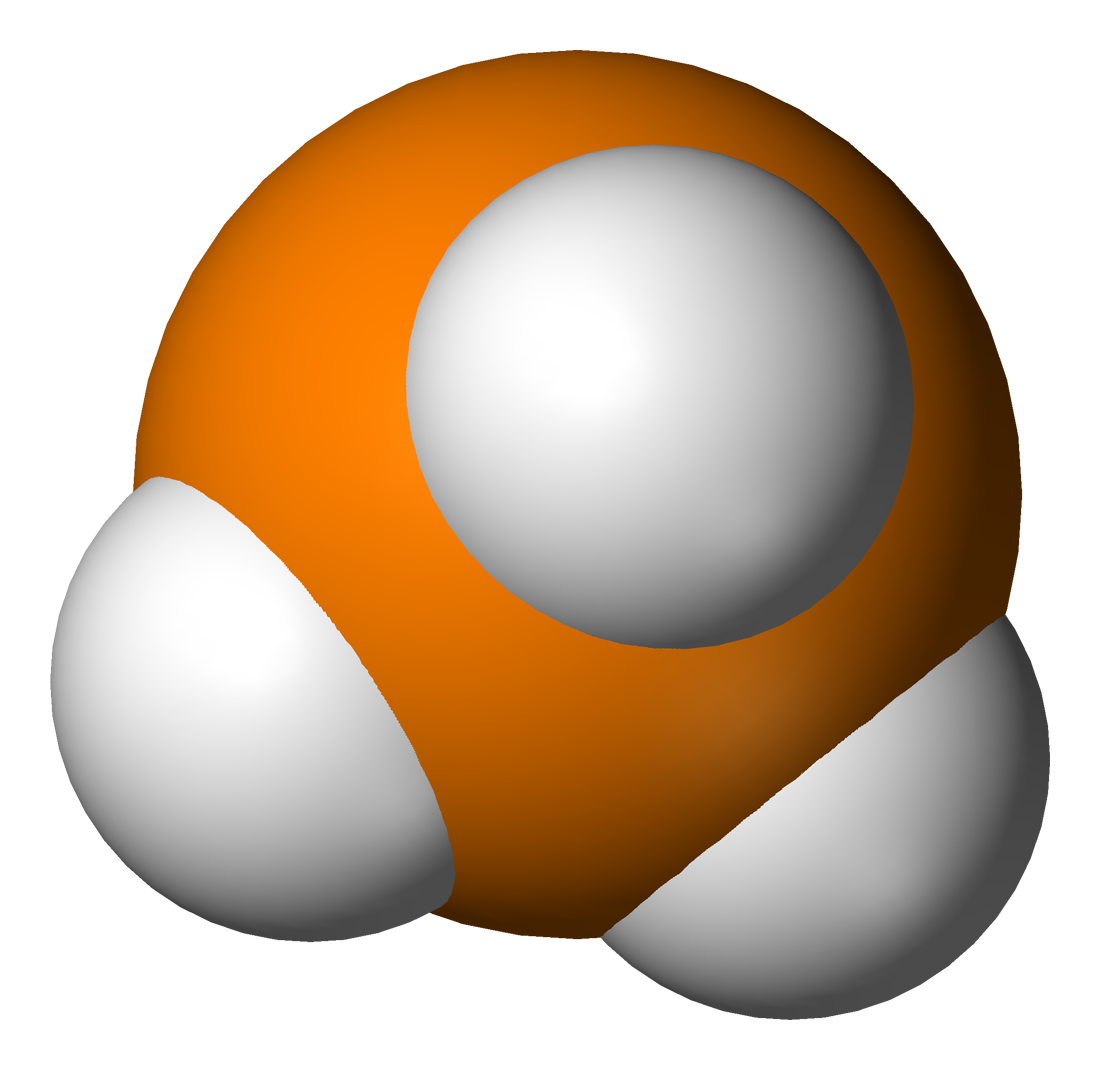
Spacefill model of phosphine
Phosphorus, P
Hydrogen, H

Names
- IUPAC name Phosphane
- Other names Hydrogen phosphide Phosphamine; Phosphorus trihydride Phosphorated hydrogen

Identifiers
CAS Number	7803-51-2
3D model (JSmol)	Interactive image
ChEBI	CHEBI:30278
ChemSpider	22814
ECHA InfoCard	100.029.328
EC Number	232-260-8
Gmelin Reference	287
PubChem CID	24404
RTECS number	SY7525000
UNII	FW6947296I
UN number	2199
CompTox Dashboard (EPA)	DTXSID2021157
- InChI: InChI=1S/H3P/h1H3 Key: XYFCBTPGUUZFHI-UHFFFAOYSA-N; InChI=1/H3P/h1H3 Key: XYFCBTPGUUZFHI-UHFFFAOYAP
- SMILES: P

Properties
Chemical formula	PH_{3}
Molar mass	33.99758 g/mol
Appearance	Colourless gas
Odor	odorless as pure compound; fish-like or garlic-like commercially
Density	1.379 g/L, gas (25 °C)
Melting point	−132.8 °C (−207.0 °F; 140.3 K)
Boiling point	−87.7 °C (−125.9 °F; 185.5 K)
Solubility in water	31.2 mg/100 ml (17 °C)
Solubility	Soluble in alcohol, ether, CS_{2} slightly soluble in benzene, chloroform, ethanol
Vapor pressure	41.3 atm (20 °C)
Conjugate acid	Phosphonium (PH^{+}_{4})
Refractive index (n_{D})	2.144
Viscosity	1.1×10^{−5} Pa⋅s

Structure
Molecular shape	Trigonal pyramidal
Dipole moment	0.58 D

Thermochemistry
Heat capacity (C)	37 J/mol⋅K
Std molar entropy (S^{⦵}_{298})	210 J/mol⋅K
Std enthalpy of formation (Δ_{f}H^{⦵}_{298})	5 kJ/mol
Gibbs free energy (Δ_{f}G^{⦵})	13 kJ/mol

Hazards
- GHS labelling
Pictograms	(GHS02: Flammable) (GHS06: Toxic) (GHS05: Corrosive) (GHS09: Environmental hazard)
NFPA 704 (fire diamond)	4 4 2
Flash point	Flammable gas
Autoignition temperature	38 °C (100 °F; 311 K) (see text)
Explosive limits	1.79–98%
- Lethal dose or concentration (LD, LC)
LD_{50} (median dose)	3.03 mg/kg (rat, oral)
LC_{50} (median concentration)	11 ppm (rat, 4 hr)
LC_{Lo} (lowest published)	1000 ppm (mammal, 5 min); 270 ppm (mouse, 2 hr); 100 ppm (guinea pig, 4 hr); 50 ppm (cat, 2 hr); 2500 ppm (rabbit, 20 min); 1000 ppm (human, 5 min)
- NIOSH (US health exposure limits)
PEL (Permissible)	TWA 0.3 ppm (0.4 mg/m^{3})
REL (Recommended)	TWA 0.3 ppm (0.4 mg/m^{3}), ST 1 ppm (1 mg/m^{3})
IDLH (Immediate danger)	50 ppm
Safety data sheet (SDS)	ICSC 0694

Related compounds
Other cations	Ammonia; Arsine; Stibine; Bismuthine
Related compounds	Trimethylphosphine; Triphenylphosphine; Hydrogen sulfide
- Except where otherwise noted, data are given for materials in their standard state (at 25 °C [77 °F], 100 kPa). verify (what is ?) Infobox references

Phosphine (IUPAC name: phosphane) is a colorless, flammable, highly toxic compound with the chemical formula PH_{3}, classed as a pnictogen hydride. Pure phosphine is odorless, but technical grade samples have a highly unpleasant odor like rotting fish, due to the presence of substituted phosphine and diphosphane (P_{2}H_{4}). With traces of P_{2}H_{4} present, PH_{3} is spontaneously flammable in air (pyrophoric), burning with a luminous flame. Phosphine is a highly toxic respiratory poison, and is immediately dangerous to life or health at 50 ppm. Phosphine has a trigonal pyramidal structure.

Phosphines are compounds that include PH_{3} and the organophosphines, which are derived from PH_{3} by substituting one or more hydrogen atoms with organic groups. They have the general formula PH_{3−n}R_{n}. Phosphanes are saturated phosphorus hydrides of the form P_{n}H_{n+2}, such as triphosphane. Phosphine (PH_{3}) is the smallest of the phosphines and the smallest of the phosphanes.

== History ==
Philippe Gengembre (1764–1838), a student of Lavoisier, first obtained phosphine in 1783 by heating white phosphorus in an aqueous solution of potash (potassium carbonate). (Note: For further information about the early history of phosphine, see: The Encyclopædia Britannica (1911 edition), vol. 21, p. 480: Phosphorus: Phosphine.; Thomas Thomson, A System of Chemistry, 6th ed. (London, England: Baldwin, Cradock, and Joy, 1820), vol. 1, p. 272.)

Perhaps because of its strong association with elemental phosphorus, phosphine was once regarded as a gaseous form of the element, but Lavoisier (1789) recognised it as a combination of phosphorus with hydrogen and described it as phosphure d'hydrogène (phosphide of hydrogen). (Note: Note: On p. 222 of his Traité élémentaire de chimie, vol. 1, (Paris, France: Cuchet, 1789), Lavoisier calls the compound of phosphorus and hydrogen "phosphure d'hydrogène" (hydrogen phosphide). However, on p. 216, he calls the compound of hydrogen and phosphorus "Combinaison inconnue." (unknown combination), yet in a footnote, he says about the reactions of hydrogen with sulfur and with phosphorus: "Ces combinaisons ont lieu dans l'état de gaz & il en résulte du gaz hydrogène sulfurisé & phosphorisé." (These combinations occur in the gaseous state, and there results from them sulfurized and phosphorized hydrogen gas.); In Robert Kerr's 1790 English translation of Lavoisier's Traité élémentaire de chimie ... — namely, Lavoisier with Robert Kerr, trans., Elements of Chemistry ... (Edinburgh, Scotland: William Creech, 1790) — Kerr translates Lavoisier's "phosphure d'hydrogène" as "phosphuret of hydrogen" (p. 204), and whereas Lavoisier — on p. 216 of his Traité élémentaire de chimie ... — gave no name to the combination of hydrogen and phosphorus, Kerr calls it "hydruret of phosphorus, or phosphuret of hydrogen" (p. 198). Lavoisier's note about this compound — "Combinaison inconnue." — is translated: "Hitherto unknown." Lavoisier's footnote is translated as: "These combinations take place in the state of gas, and form, respectively, sulphurated and phosphorated oxygen gas." The word "oxygen" in the translation is an error because the original text clearly reads "hydrogène" (hydrogen). (The error was corrected in subsequent editions.))

In 1844, Paul Thénard, son of the French chemist Louis Jacques Thénard, used a cold trap to separate diphosphine from phosphine that had been generated from calcium phosphide, thereby demonstrating that P_{2}H_{4} is responsible for spontaneous flammability associated with PH_{3}, and also for the characteristic orange/brown color that can form on surfaces, which is a polymerisation product. He considered diphosphine's formula to be PH_{2}, and thus an intermediate between elemental phosphorus, the higher polymers, and phosphine. Calcium phosphide (nominally Ca_{3}P_{2}) produces more P_{2}H_{4} than other phosphides because of the preponderance of P–P bonds in the starting material.

The name "phosphine" was first used for organophosphorus compounds in 1857, being analogous to organic amines (NR_{3}). (Note: In 1857, August Wilhelm von Hofmann announced the synthesis of organic compounds containing phosphorus, which he named "trimethylphosphine" and "triethylphosphine", in analogy with "amine" (organo-nitrogen compounds), "arsine" (organo-arsenic compounds), and "stibine" (organo-antimony compounds).) The gas PH_{3} was named "phosphine" by 1865 (or earlier).

== Structure and reactions ==
PH_{3} is a trigonal pyramidal molecule with C_{3v} molecular symmetry. The length of the P−H bond is 1.42 Å, the H−P−H bond angles are 93.5°. The dipole moment is 0.58 D, which increases with substitution of methyl groups in the series: CH_{3}PH_{2}, 1.10 D; (CH_{3})_{2}PH, 1.23 D; (CH_{3})_{3}P, 1.19 D. In contrast, the dipole moments of amines decrease with substitution, starting with ammonia, which has a dipole moment of 1.47 D. The low dipole moment and almost orthogonal bond angles lead to the conclusion that in PH_{3} the P−H bonds are almost entirely pσ(P) – sσ(H) and phosphorus 3s orbital contributes little to the P-H bonding. For this reason, the lone pair on phosphorus is predominantly formed by the 3s orbital of phosphorus. The upfield chemical shift of its ^{31}P NMR signal accords with the conclusion that the lone pair electrons occupy the 3s orbital (Fluck, 1973). This electronic structure leads to a lack of nucleophilicity in general and lack of basicity in particular (pK_{aH} = −14), as well as an ability to form only weak hydrogen bonds.

The aqueous solubility of PH_{3} is slight: 0.22 cm^{3} of gas dissolves in 1 cm^{3} of water. Phosphine dissolves more readily in non-polar solvents than in water because of the non-polar P−H bonds. It is technically amphoteric in water, but acid and base activity is poor. Proton exchange proceeds via a phosphonium (PH^{+}_{4}) ion in acidic solutions and via phosphanide (PH^{−}_{2}) at high pH, with equilibrium constants K_{b} = 4×10^{−28} and K_{a} = 41.6×10^{−29}. Phosphine reacts with water only at high pressure and temperature, producing phosphoric acid and hydrogen:

PH_{3} + 4 H_{2}O H_{3}PO_{4} + 4 H_{2}

Burning phosphine in the air produces phosphoric acid:

PH_{3} + 2 O_{2} H_{3}PO_{4}.

== Preparation and occurrence ==
Phosphine may be prepared in a variety of ways. Industrially it can be made by the reaction of white phosphorus with sodium or potassium hydroxide, producing potassium or sodium hypophosphite as a by-product.

3 KOH + P_{4} + 3 H_{2}O → 3 KH_{2}PO_{2} + PH_{3}
3 NaOH + P_{4} + 3 H_{2}O → 3 NaH_{2}PO_{2} + PH_{3}

Alternatively, the acid-catalyzed disproportionation of white phosphorus yields phosphoric acid and phosphine. Both routes have industrial significance; the acid route is the preferred method if further reaction of the phosphine to substituted phosphines is needed. The acid route requires purification and pressurizing.

=== Laboratory routes ===
It is prepared in the laboratory by disproportionation of phosphorous acid:

4 H_{3}PO_{3} → PH_{3} + 3 H_{3}PO_{4}
Phosphine evolution occurs at around 200 °C.

Alternative methods include the hydrolysis of zinc phosphide:

Zn_{3}P_{2} + 6 H_{2}O → 3 Zn(OH)_{2} + 2 PH_{3}

Some other metal phosphides could also be used, including aluminium phosphide or calcium phosphide. Pure samples of phosphine, free from P_{2}H_{4}, may be prepared using the action of potassium hydroxide on phosphonium iodide:

[PH_{4}]I + KOH → PH_{3} + KI + H_{2}O

=== Occurrence ===
Phosphine is a worldwide constituent of the Earth's atmosphere at very low and highly variable concentrations. It may contribute significantly to the global phosphorus biochemical cycle. The most likely source is reduction of phosphate in decaying organic matter, possibly via partial reductions and disproportionations, since environmental systems do not have known reducing agents of sufficient strength to directly convert phosphate to phosphine.

It is also found in Jupiter's atmosphere.

==== Possible extraterrestrial biosignature ====
In 2020 a spectroscopic analysis was reported to show signs of phosphine in the atmosphere of Venus in quantities that could not be explained by known abiotic processes. Later re-analysis of this work showed interpolation errors had been made, and re-analysis of data with the fixed algorithm do not result in the detection of phosphine. The authors of the original study then claimed to detect it with a much lower concentration of 1 ppb.

== Applications ==
=== Organophosphorus chemistry ===
Phosphine is a precursor to many organophosphorus compounds. It reacts with formaldehyde in the presence of hydrogen chloride to give tetrakis(hydroxymethyl)phosphonium chloride, which is used in textiles. The hydrophosphination of alkenes is versatile route to a variety of phosphines. For example, in the presence of basic catalysts PH_{3} adds of Michael acceptors. Thus with acrylonitrile, it reacts to give tris(cyanoethyl)phosphine:

PH_{3} + 3 CH_{2}=CHZ → P(CH_{2}CH_{2}Z)_{3} (Z is NO_{2}, CN, or C(O)NH_{2})

Acid catalysis is applicable to hydrophosphination with isobutylene and related analogues:

PH_{3} + R_{2}C=CH_{2} → R_{2}(CH_{3})CPH_{2}

where R is CH_{3}, alkyl, etc.

=== Microelectronics ===
Phosphine is used as a dopant in the semiconductor industry, and a precursor for the deposition of compound semiconductors. Commercially significant products include gallium phosphide and indium phosphide.

=== Fumigant (pest control) ===
Phosphine is an attractive fumigant because it is lethal to insects and rodents, but degrades to phosphoric acid, which is non-toxic. As sources of phosphine, for farm use, pellets of aluminium phosphide (AlP), calcium phosphide (Ca_{3}P_{2}), or zinc phosphide (Zn_{3}P_{2}) are used. These phosphides release phosphine upon contact with atmospheric water or rodents' stomach acid. These pellets also contain reagents to reduce the potential for ignition or explosion of the released phosphine.

An alternative is the use of phosphine gas itself which requires dilution with either CO_{2} or N_{2} or even air to bring it below the flammability point. Use of the gas avoids the issues related with the solid residues left by metal phosphide and results in faster, more efficient control of the target pests.

One problem with phosphine fumigants is the increased resistance by insects.

== Toxicity and safety ==
Deaths have resulted from accidental exposure to fumigation materials containing aluminium phosphide or phosphine. It can be absorbed either by inhalation or transdermally. As a respiratory poison, it affects the transport of oxygen or interferes with the utilization of oxygen by various cells in the body. Exposure results in pulmonary edema (the lungs fill with fluid). Phosphine gas is heavier than air so it stays near the floor.

Phosphine appears to be mainly a redox toxin, causing cell damage by inducing oxidative stress and mitochondrial dysfunction. Resistance in insects is caused by a mutation in a mitochondrial metabolic gene.

Phosphine can be absorbed into the body by inhalation. The main target organ of phosphine gas is the respiratory tract. According to the 2009 U.S. National Institute for Occupational Safety and Health (NIOSH) pocket guide, and U.S. Occupational Safety and Health Administration (OSHA) regulation, the 8 hour average respiratory exposure should not exceed 0.3 ppm. NIOSH recommends that the short term respiratory exposure to phosphine gas should not exceed 1 ppm. The Immediately Dangerous to Life or Health level is 50 ppm. Overexposure to phosphine gas causes nausea, vomiting, abdominal pain, diarrhea, thirst, chest tightness, dyspnea (breathing difficulty), muscle pain, chills, stupor or syncope, and pulmonary edema. Phosphine has been reported to have the odor of decaying fish or garlic at concentrations below 0.3 ppm. The smell is normally restricted to laboratory areas or phosphine processing since the smell comes from the way the phosphine is extracted from the environment. However, it may occur elsewhere, such as in industrial waste landfills. Exposure to higher concentrations may cause olfactory fatigue.

=== Fumigation hazards ===
Phosphine is used for pest control, but its usage is strictly regulated due to high toxicity. Gas from phosphine has high mortality rate and has caused deaths in Sweden and other countries.

Because the previously popular fumigant methyl bromide has been phased out in some countries under the Montreal Protocol, phosphine is the only widely used, cost-effective, rapidly acting fumigant that does not leave residues on the stored product. Pests with high levels of resistance toward phosphine have become common in Asia, Australia and Brazil. High level resistance is also likely to occur in other regions, but has not been as closely monitored. Genetic variants that contribute to high level resistance to phosphine have been identified in the dihydrolipoamide dehydrogenase gene. Identification of this gene now allows rapid molecular identification of resistant insects.

=== Explosiveness ===
Phosphine gas is denser than air and hence may collect in low-lying areas. It can form explosive mixtures with air, and may also self-ignite.

== In fiction ==
Anne McCaffrey's Dragonriders of Pern series features genetically engineered dragons that breathe fire by producing phosphine by extracting it from minerals of their native planet.

In the 2008 pilot of the crime drama television series Breaking Bad, Walter White poisons two rival gangsters by adding red phosphorus to boiling water to produce phosphine gas. However, this reaction in reality would require white phosphorus instead, and for the water to contain sodium hydroxide.

== See also ==
- Diphosphane, H_{2}P−PH_{2}, simplified to P_{2}H_{4}
- Diphosphene, HP=PH
