= Calcium phosphide =

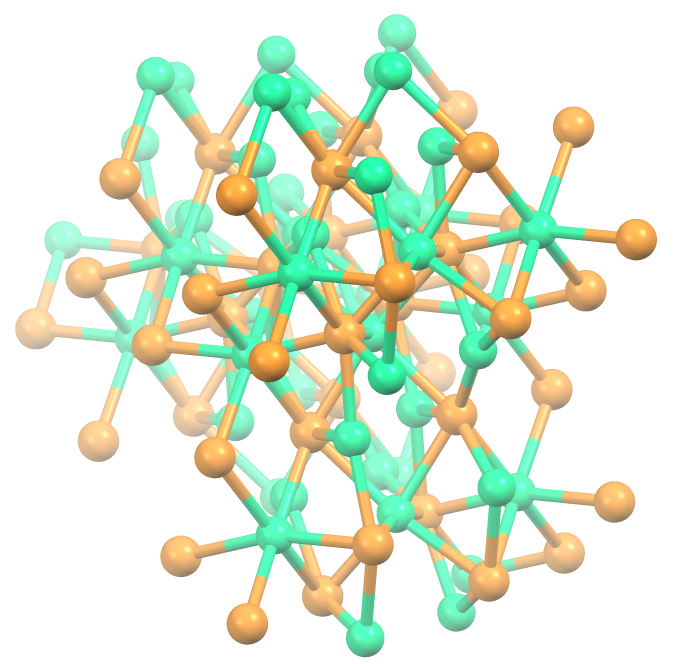

Names
- IUPAC name Calcium phosphide
- Other names Photophor, CP, Polythanol

Identifiers
3D model (JSmol)	Interactive image
ChemSpider	14097
ECHA InfoCard	100.013.766
EC Number	215-142-0
PubChem CID	4337964
UNII	IQZ9FY9THC
CompTox Dashboard (EPA)	DTXSID0058271
- InChI: InChI=1S/3Ca.2P/q;;+2;2*-1 Key: GOKCLHLCMXPYLQ-UHFFFAOYSA-N
- SMILES: [Ca+2].[Ca+2].[Ca+2].[P-3].[P-3]

Properties
Chemical formula	Ca_{3}P_{2}
Molar mass	182.18 g/mol
Appearance	red-brown crystalline powder or grey lumps
Density	2.51 g/cm^{3}
Melting point	~1600 °C
Solubility in water	decomposes

Hazards
- Occupational safety and health (OHS/OSH)
Main hazards	Source of toxic phosphine, dangerous reaction with water
- GHS labelling
Pictograms	(GHS02: Flammable) (GHS05: Corrosive) (GHS06: Toxic) (GHS09: Environmental hazard)
Signal word	Danger
Hazard statements	H260, H300, H311, H318, H330, H400
Precautionary statements	P231+P232, P233, P280, P301+P310, P405, P501
NFPA 704 (fire diamond)	4 0 3 W
- Except where otherwise noted, data are given for materials in their standard state (at 25 °C [77 °F], 100 kPa). verify (what is ?) Infobox references

Calcium phosphide (CP) is the inorganic compound with the formula Ca_{3}P_{2}. It is one of several phosphides of calcium, being described as the salt-like material composed of Ca^{2+} and P^{3−}. Other, more exotic calcium phosphides have the formula CaP / Ca_{2}P_{2}, CaP_{3}, and Ca_{5}P_{8}.

Ca_{3}P_{2} has the appearance of red-brown crystalline powder or grey lumps. Its trade name is Photophor for the incendiary use or Polytanol for the use as rodenticide.

== Preparation, history and structure ==
It may be formed by reaction of the elements, but it is more commonly prepared by carbothermal reduction of calcium phosphate:

Ca_{3}(PO_{4})_{2} + 8 C → Ca_{3}P_{2} + 8 CO

This is also the way how it was accidentally discovered by Smithson Tennant in 1791 while verifying the composition of carbon dioxide proposed by Antoine Lavoisier by reducing calcium carbonate with phosphorus.

The structure of the room temperature form of Ca_{3}P_{2} has not been confirmed by X-ray crystallography. A high temperature phase has been characterized by Rietveld refinement. Ca^{2+} centers are octahedral.

== Uses ==
Metal phosphides are used as a rodenticide. A mixture of food and calcium phosphide is left where the rodents can eat it. The acid in the digestive system of the rodent reacts with the phosphide to generate the toxic gas phosphine. This method of vermin control has possible use in places where rodents immune to many of the common warfarin-type (anticoagulant) poisons have appeared. Other pesticides similar to calcium phosphide are zinc phosphide and aluminium phosphide.

Calcium phosphide is also used in fireworks, torpedoes, self-igniting naval pyrotechnic flares, and various water-activated ammunition. During the 1920s and 1930s, Charles Kingsford Smith used separate buoyant canisters of calcium carbide and calcium phosphide as naval flares lasting up to ten minutes. It is speculated that calcium phosphide—made by boiling bones in urine, within a closed vessel—was an ingredient of some ancient Greek fire formulas.

Calcium phosphide is a common impurity in calcium carbide, which may cause the resulting phosphine-contaminated acetylene to ignite spontaneously.

== See also ==
- Phosphorus
