= Diimide =

Ball and stick model of diazene ((E)-diazene)
E/trans-diazene
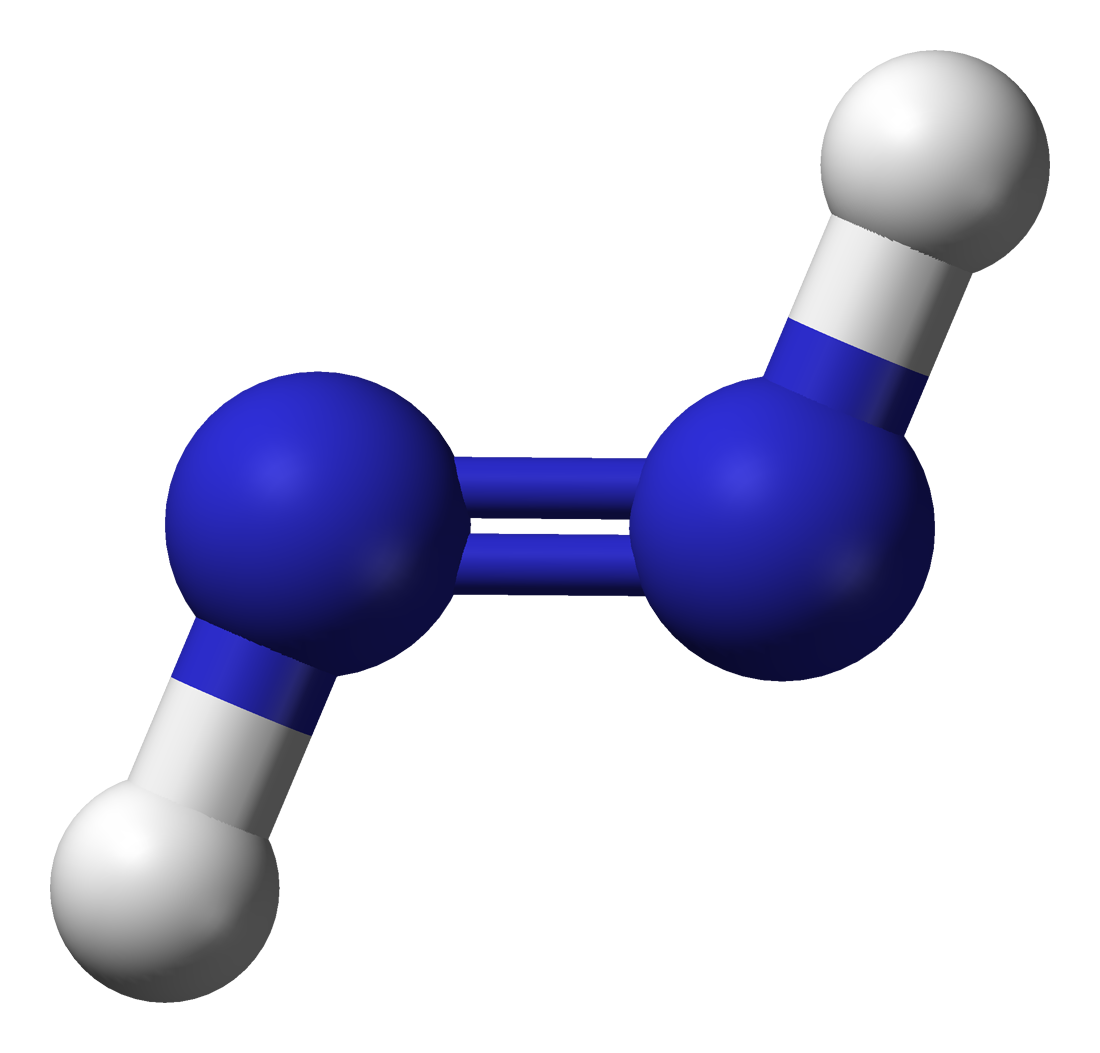
Structural formula of diazene ((E)-diazene)
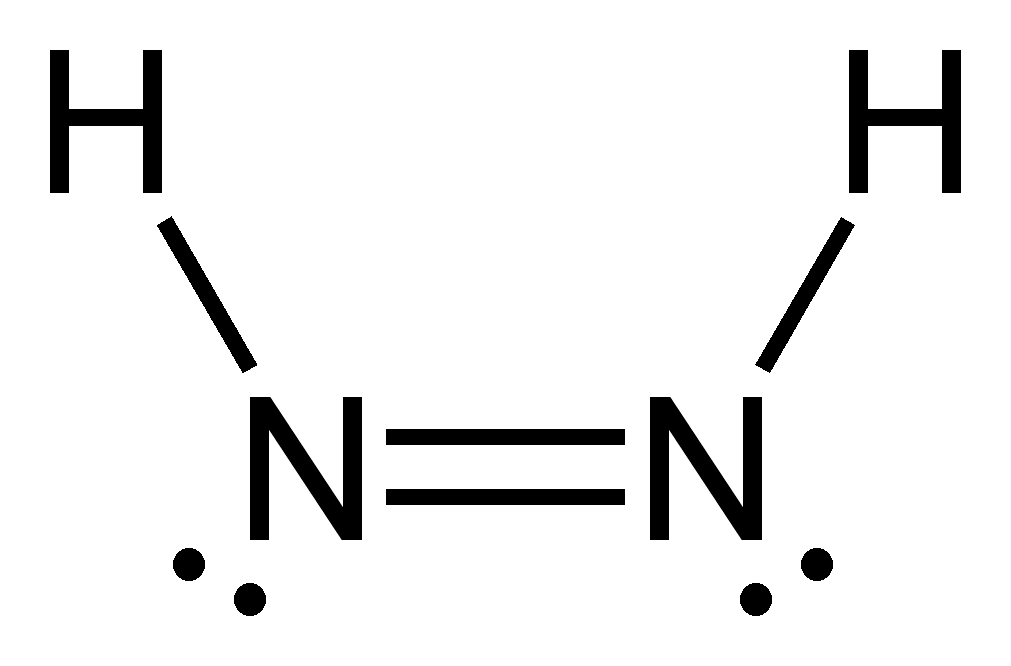
Structural formula of diazene ((Z)-diazene)
Z/cis-diazene
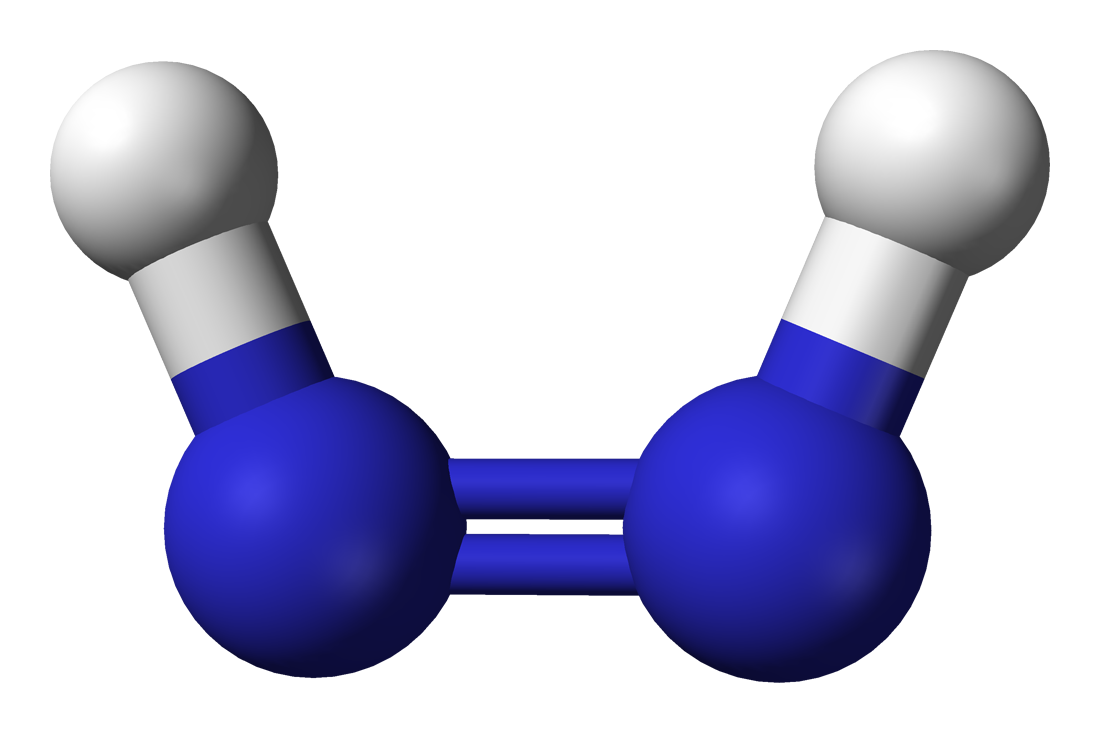
Ball and stick model of diazene ((Z)-diazene)

Names
- IUPAC name Diazene
- Other names Diimide; Diimine; Dihydridodinitrogen; Azodihydrogen

Identifiers
CAS Number	3618-05-1; 15626-43-4 (E)-diazene; 15626-42-3 (Z)-diazene
3D model (JSmol)	Interactive image
ChEBI	CHEBI:30096
ChemSpider	10612167
KEGG	C05360
MeSH	Diazene
PubChem CID	123195
UNII	LM321PYV3Y
CompTox Dashboard (EPA)	DTXSID00189748
- InChI: InChI=1S/H2N2/c1-2/h1-2H Key: RAABOESOVLLHRU-UHFFFAOYSA-N; InChI=1/H2N2/c1-2/h1-2H Key: RAABOESOVLLHRU-UHFFFAOYAG
- SMILES: N=N

Properties
Chemical formula	N_{2}H_{2}
Molar mass	30.030 g·mol^{−1}
Appearance	Yellow gas
Melting point	−80 °C (−112 °F; 193 K)

Related compounds
Other anions	diphosphene dinitrogen difluoride
Other cations	azo compounds
Related Binary azanes	ammonia; diazane; triazane
Related compounds	isodiazene; triazene; tetrazene
- Except where otherwise noted, data are given for materials in their standard state (at 25 °C [77 °F], 100 kPa). verify (what is ?) Infobox references

Diimide, also called diazene or diimine, is a compound having the formula HN=NH. It exists as two geometric isomers, E (trans) and Z (cis). The term diazene is more common for organic derivatives of diimide. Thus, azobenzene is an example of an organic diazene.

== Synthesis ==
A traditional route to diimide involves oxidation of hydrazine with hydrogen peroxide or air.

N_{2}H_{4} + H_{2}O_{2} → N_{2}H_{2} + 2H_{2}O

Alternatively the hydrolysis of diethyl azodicarboxylate or azodicarbonamide affords diimide:

Et−O_{2}C−N=N−CO_{2}−Et → HN=NH + 2 CO_{2} + 2 HOEt

Nowadays, diimide is generated by thermal decomposition of 2,4,6‐triisopropylbenzenesulfonylhydrazide.

Because of its instability, diimide is generated and used in-situ. A mixture of both the cis (Z-) and trans (E-) isomers is produced. Both isomers are unstable, and they undergo a slow interconversion. The trans isomer is more stable, but the cis isomer is the one that reacts with unsaturated substrates, therefore the equilibrium between them shifts towards the cis isomer due to Le Chatelier's principle. Some procedures call for the addition of carboxylic acids, which catalyse the cis–trans isomerization. Diimide decomposes readily. Even at low temperatures, the more stable trans isomer rapidly undergoes various disproportionation reactions, primarily forming hydrazine and nitrogen gas:

2 HN=NH → H_{2}N−NH_{2} + N_{2}

Because of this competing decomposition reaction, reductions with diimide typically require a large excess of the precursor reagent.

== Applications to organic synthesis ==
Diimide is occasionally useful as a reagent in organic synthesis. It hydrogenates alkenes and alkynes with selective delivery of hydrogen from one face of the substrate resulting in the same stereoselectivity as metal-catalysed syn addition of H_{2}. The only coproduct released is nitrogen gas. Although the method is cumbersome, the use of diimide avoids the need for high pressures or hydrogen gas and metal catalysts, which can be expensive. The hydrogenation mechanism involves a six-membered C_{2}H_{2}N_{2} transition state:

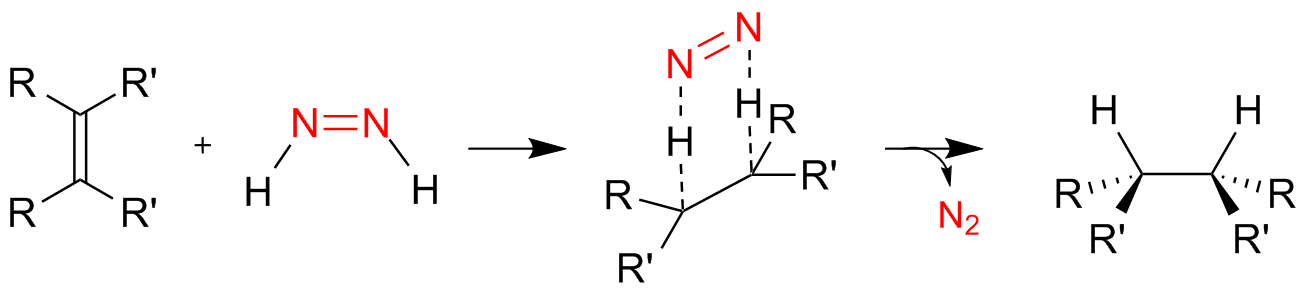

=== Selectivity ===
Diimide is advantageous because it selectively reduces alkenes and alkynes and is unreactive toward many functional groups that would interfere with normal catalytic hydrogenation. Thus, peroxides, alkyl halides, and thiols are tolerated by diimide, but these same groups would typically be degraded by metal catalysts. The reagent preferentially reduces alkynes and unhindered or strained alkenes to the corresponding alkenes and alkanes.

== Related ==
The dicationic form, H−N^{+}≡N^{+}−H (diazynediium, diprotonated dinitrogen), is calculated to have the strongest known chemical bond. This ion can be thought of as a doubly protonated nitrogen molecule. The relative bond strength order (RBSO) is 3.38. F−N^{+}≡N^{+}−H (fluorodiazynediium ion) and F−N^{+}≡N^{+}−F (difluorodiazynediium ion) have slightly lower strength bonds.

In the presence of strong bases, diimide deprotonates to form the diazenide anion, N^{−}=N^{−}.
