= Triazane =

Names
- Systematic IUPAC name Triazane

Identifiers
CAS Number	14451-01-5
3D model (JSmol)	Interactive image
ChemSpider	394177
PubChem CID	446953
CompTox Dashboard (EPA)	DTXSID60332238
- InChI: InChI=1S/H5N3/c1-3-2/h3H,1-2H2 Key: PYHOFAHZHOBVGV-UHFFFAOYSA-N
- SMILES: NNN

Properties
Chemical formula	N_{3}H_{5}
Molar mass	47.061 g·mol^{−1}

Related compounds
Related compounds	Ammonia; Hydrazine; Diazene; Triazene; Tetrazene; Pentazole; Hexazine; Phosphine; Diphosphane; Triphosphane; Diphosphene; Hexaphosphabenzene; Arsine; Diarsane; Triarsane; Stibine; Bismuthine
- Except where otherwise noted, data are given for materials in their standard state (at 25 °C [77 °F], 100 kPa). Infobox references

Triazane is an inorganic compound with the chemical formula NH_{2}NHNH_{2} or N_{3}H_{5}. Triazane is the third simplest acyclic azane after ammonia and hydrazine. It can be synthesized from hydrazine but is unstable and cannot be isolated in the free base form, only as salt forms such as triazanium sulfate. Attempts to convert triazanium salts to the free base release only diazene and ammonia. Triazane has been stabilized as a complex ion with zeolitic silver structures. Triazane has also been synthesized in electron-irradiated ammonia ices and detected as a stable gas-phase product after sublimation.

== Compounds containing the triazane skeleton ==
Several compounds containing the triazane skeleton are known, including 1-methyl-1-nitrosohydrazine (NH_{2}−N(CH_{3})−N=O), produced from the solventless reaction of methylhydrazine (CH_{3}NHNH_{2}) and an alkyl nitrite (R−O−N=O):

CH_{3}NHNH_{2} + RONO → NH_{2}N(CH_{3})NO + ROH

1-Methyl-1-nitrosohydrazine is a colorless solid, sensitive to impact, but not to friction. It melts at 45 °C and decomposes at 121 °C.
