= Diphosphenes =

Organophosphorus compound with a phosphorus–phosphorus double bond

Diphosphene is a type of organophosphorus compound that has a phosphorus–phosphorus double bond, denoted by R-P=P-R'. These compounds are not common, but their properties have theoretical importance.

Normally, compounds with the empirical formula RP exist as rings. However, like other multiple bonds between heavy main-group elements, P=P double bonds can be stabilized by large steric hindrance. In general, diphosphenes react like alkenes.

== History ==
In 1877, Köhler and Michaelis claimed what would have been the first isolated diphosphene (PhP=PPh), The structure of Köhler and Michaelis' product was later revised. and X-ray crystallographic analysis proved that this "diphosphene" only had P-P single bonds and was in fact primarily a four-membered ring of the form (PPh)_{4}. The isolation of phosphorus ylide and phosphaalkenes suggested that compounds with P=P bonds could be made.

Yoshifuji et al's isolated a sterically-hindered diphosphene in 1981. That compound's P-P bond distance is 2.034 Å, which is much shorter than the average bond length in (C_{6}H_{5}P)_{5} (2.217 Å) and (C_{6}H_{5}P)_{6} (2.237 Å) and indicates double-bond character.

== Synthesis ==
Following Maasaka Yoshifuji and his coworkers' 1981 preparation of bis(2,4,6-tri-tert-butylphenyl)diphosphene, most disphosphene syntheses involve dehalogenation of bulkyl aryldichlorophosphine (ArPCl_{2}). Mg is a typical dehalogenation reagent:

2 ArPCl_{2} + 2 Mg → ArP=PAr + 2 MgCl_{2}

Such a synthesis works also for trisalkylsilylphosphines, or N-heterocyclic boro-phosphines.

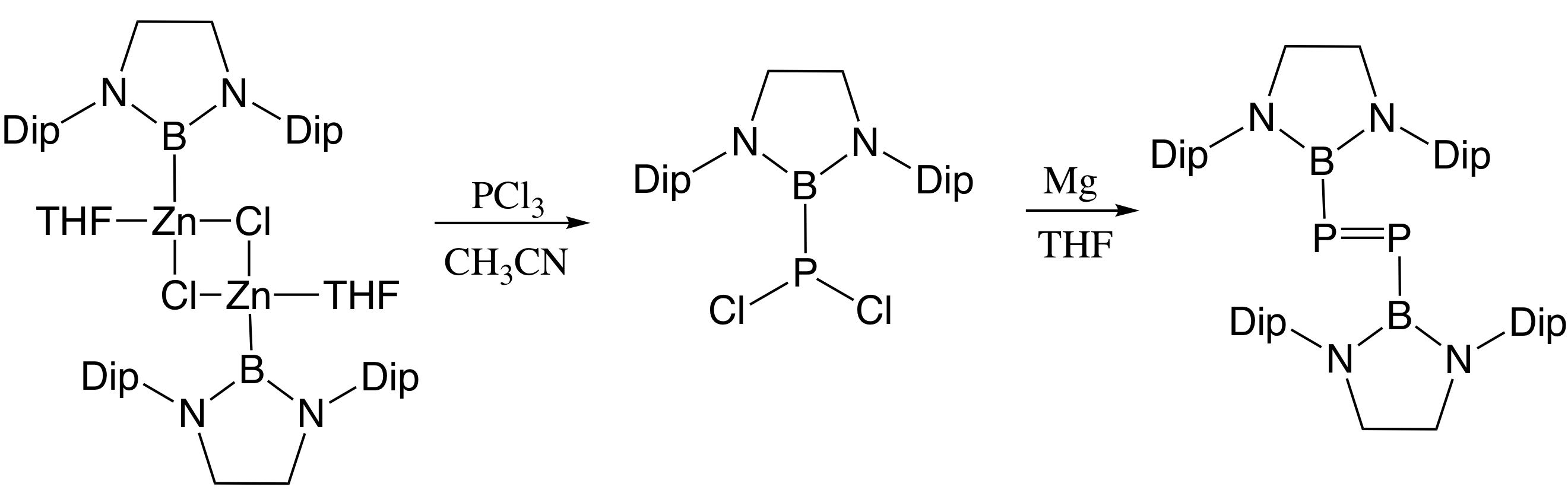
Synthesis of diboryldiphosphene (dipp = 2,6-diisopropylphenyl)

=== Ylide-stabilized diphosphenes ===
Examples of di-vinyl-substituted diphosphenes arise via a ring opening/dimerization process from kinetically unstable 2H-phosphirenes. However, the conjugation caused the compounds to exhibit reactivity closer to a phosphinidene.

== Structure ==
Cyclic voltammetry and UV/Vis spectra indicate that boryl-substituted diphosphenes have lower LUMO level and larger HOMO–LUMO gap than aryl-substituted diphosphenes.

=== Geometry ===
According to X-ray crystallography, the following parameters describe bis(2,4,6-tri-tert-butylphenyl)diphosphene: P-P = 2.034 (2) Å; P-C = 1.826 (2) Å; $\angle$P-P-C = 102.8 (1)^{o}; $\angle$C-P-P-C = 172.2 (1)^{o}. Compared with the length of a P-P single bond in H_{2}PPH_{2} (2.238 Å), the P-P bond distance is much shorter, which reveals double bond character. The trans orientation is the thermodynamically preferred isomer.

=== Spectroscopic properties ===
Diphosphene compounds usually exhibit a symmetry-allowed ($\pi \rightarrow \pi^*$) (intense) and symmetry-forbidden ($n\rightarrow \pi^*$) (weak) electronic transitions. In the Raman spectrum, the P=P vibration is enhanced by resonance with allowed the $\pi \rightarrow \pi^*$ transition than with the forbidden $n\rightarrow \pi^*$ transition due to different geometries of excited states and enhancement mechanism. Also the observed strong Raman shifts for (CH(SiMe_{3})_{2})_{2}P_{2}and (CH(SiMe_{3})_{2}P=PC(SiMe_{3})_{2}) suggest stronger dipnictenes feature of diphosphene compared with P-P single bond.

== Reactivity ==
Lithium aluminium hydride reduces diphosphene to give diphosphanes.

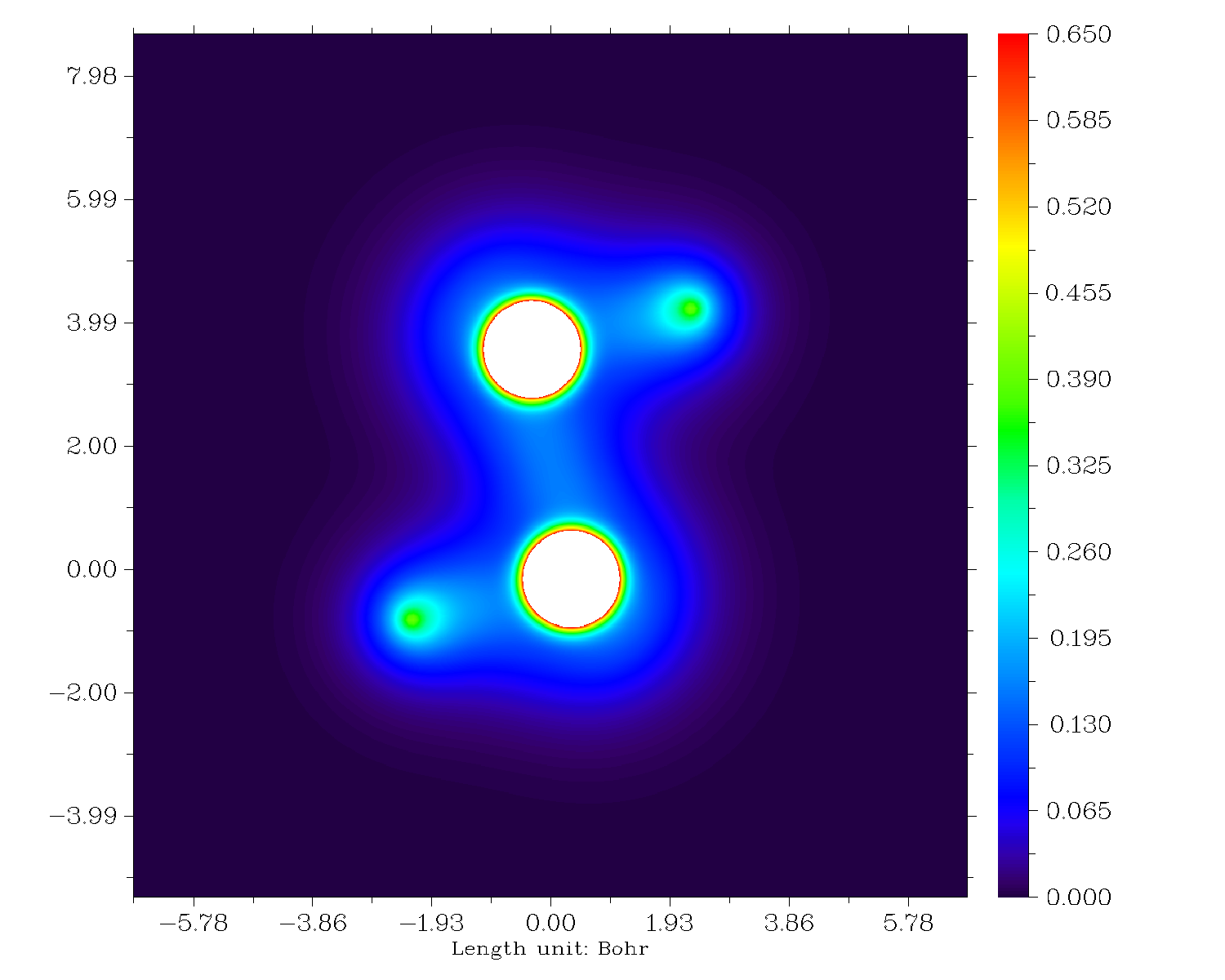
Color-filled map of electron density of P_{2}H_{2}

Carbenes add across the double bond, to give diphosphiranes, which further rearrange to 1,3-diphospha-allenes in strong bases.

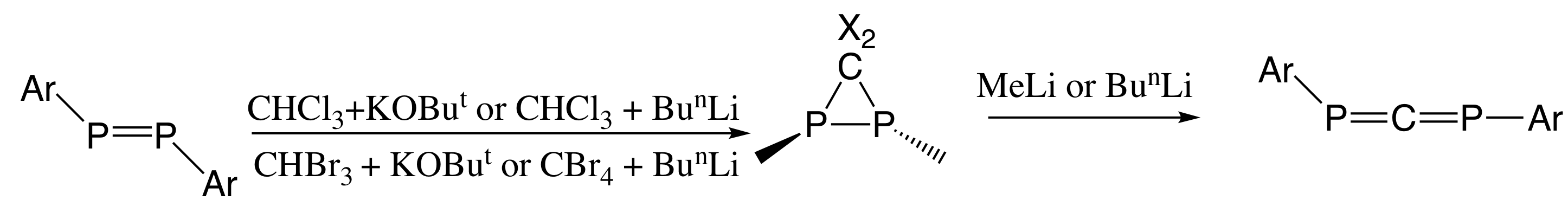

Diphosphene is inert to oxygen but cycloadds to ozone to give highly unstable phosphorus-oxygen rings that tend to attack the phosphorus' organyl substituents. The reaction with ozone is much more rapid and indicates a 2:1 (ozone:diphosphene) stoichiometry.

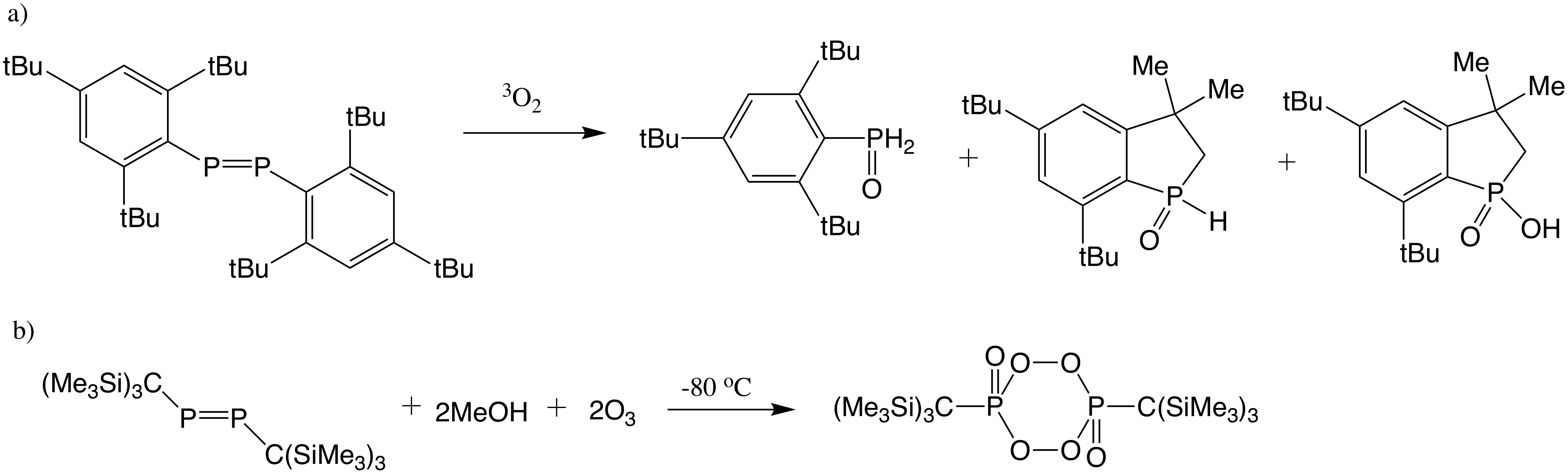
Two oxidations of diphosphenes: a) Oxidation by triplet oxygen; b) Oxidation by ozone

When treated with strongly nucleophilic NHC's, the P=P bond cleaves giving phosphinidene compounds:

RP=PR + L → 2 RP−L

=== Coordination to transition metals ===
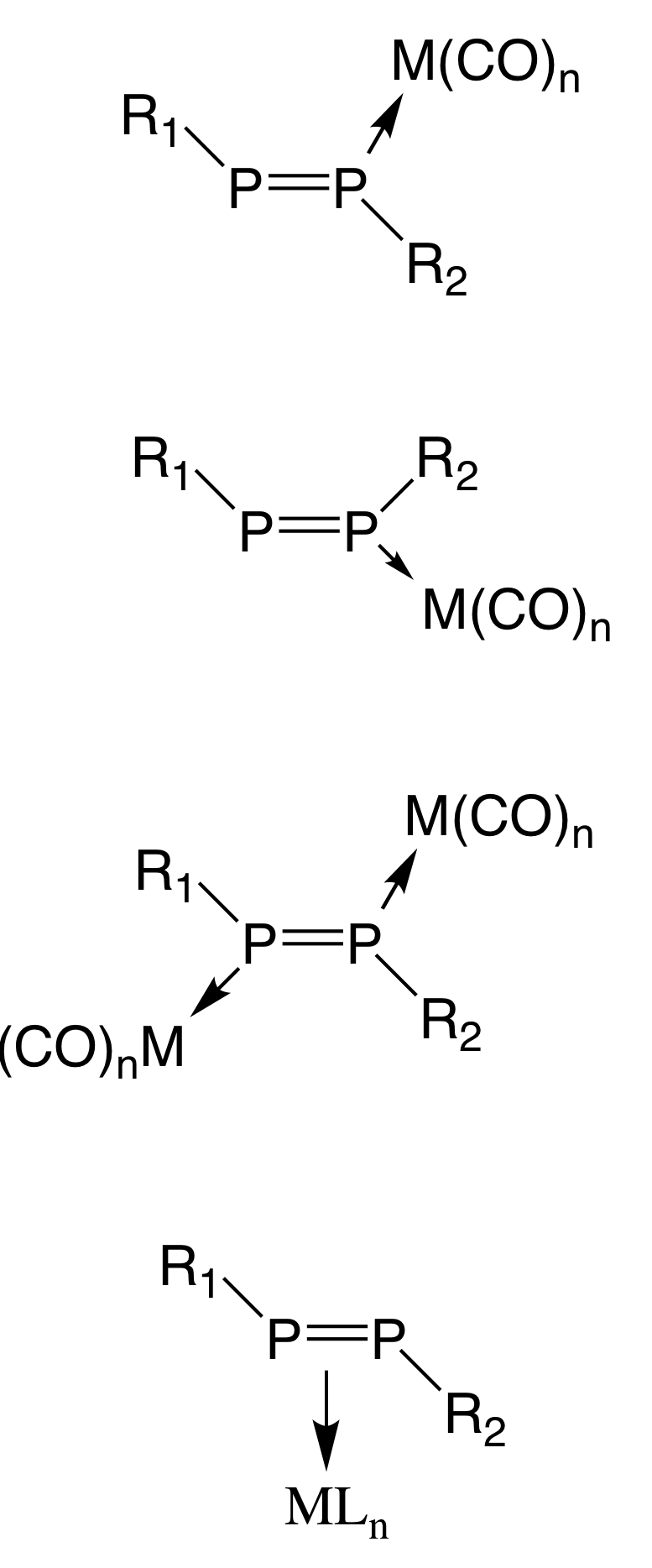
Coordination modes typical for diphosphenes.

Diphosphines form a variety of coordination complexes. Diphosphenes can bind to transition metal either in a η^{1} or in a η^{2} mode.

[Fe(CO)_{4}]_{2}[P_{2}(CH(SiMe_{3})]_{2} is obtained by treating Na_{2}[Fe(CO)_{4}] with dichlorobis(trimethylsilyl)methylphosphine. The related complex [ArP=PAr]Fe(CO)_{4} (Ar=2,4,6-tri-tert-butylphenyl) arises by treating diphosephene with Fe_{2}(CO)_{9}.

η^{2}-coordination is illustrated by (M(PhP=PPh)L_{2}) (with M=Pt or Pd and L = (PPh_{3})_{2} or Ph_{2}P[CH_{2}]_{2}PPh_{2}).

== See also ==
- Diazene
- Double bond rule
