= Triphosphane =

Structural formula of triphosphane
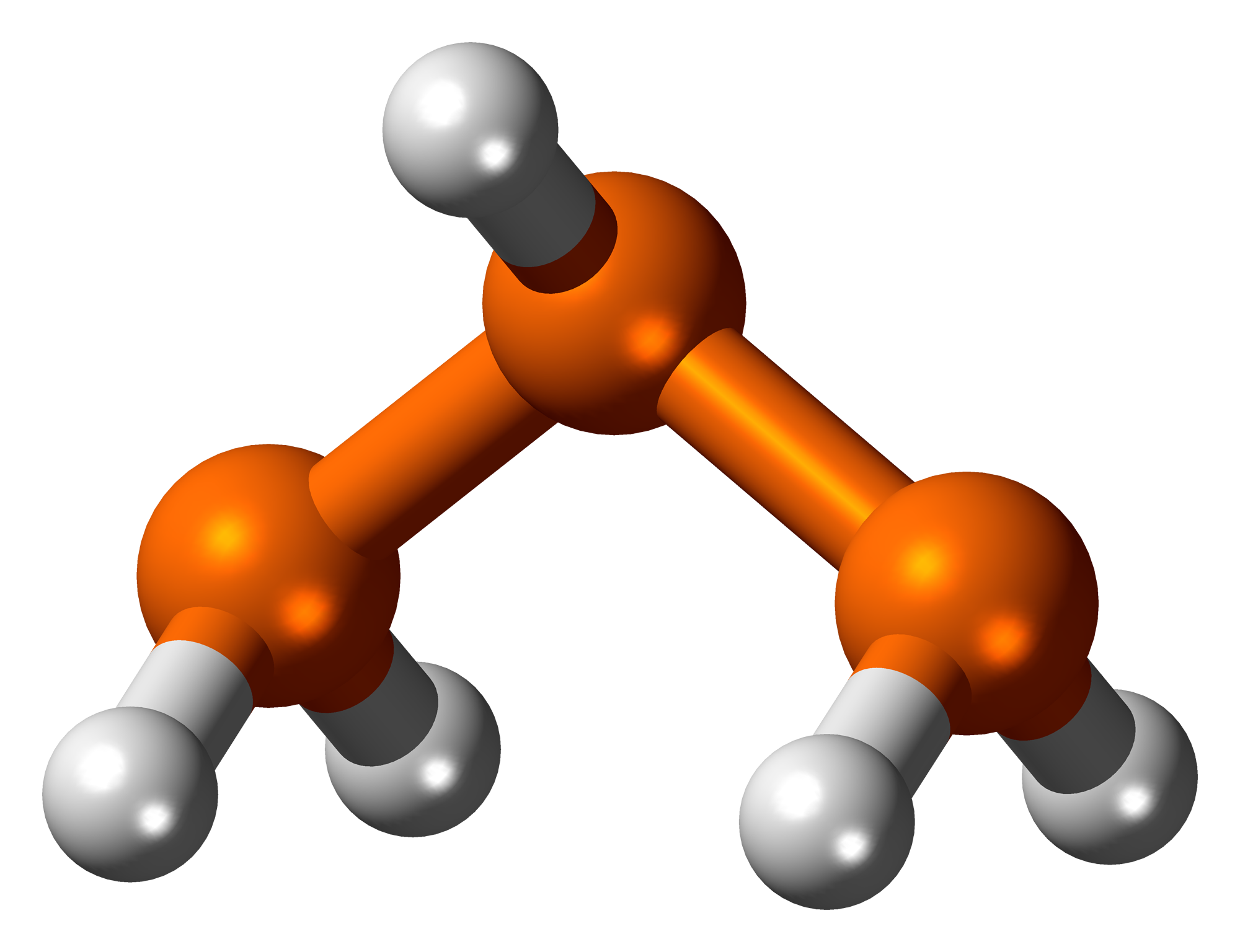
Ball-and-stick model

Names
- Systematic IUPAC name Triphosphane
- Other names Triphosphine

Identifiers
| CAS Number | 13597-70-1 |
| 3D model (JSmol) | Interactive image |
| ChEBI | CHEBI:35893 |
| ChemSpider | 123032 |
| PubChem CID | 139510 |
| CompTox Dashboard (EPA) | DTXSID80159606 |
- InChI: InChI=1S/H5P3/c1-3-2/h3H,1-2H2 Key: ITHPEWAHFNDNIO-UHFFFAOYSA-N
- SMILES: PPP

Properties
| Chemical formula | P_{3}H_{5} |
| Molar mass | 97.96099 g·mol^{−1} |
| Appearance | Colourless gas |

Related compounds
| Other anions | triazane |
| Related Binary phosphanes | phosphane diphosphane |
| Related compounds | triazene |
- Except where otherwise noted, data are given for materials in their standard state (at 25 °C [77 °F], 100 kPa). verify (what is ?) Infobox references

Triphosphane (IUPAC systematic name) or triphosphine is an inorganic compound having the chemical formula HP(PH_{2})_{2}. It can be generated from diphosphine but is highly unstable at room temperature:

2 P_{2}H_{4} → P_{3}H_{5} + PH_{3}

Samples have been isolated by gas chromatography. The compound rapidly converts to PH_{3} and the cyclophosphine cyclo-P_{5}H_{5}.
