= Triazene =

Unsaturated inorganic compound

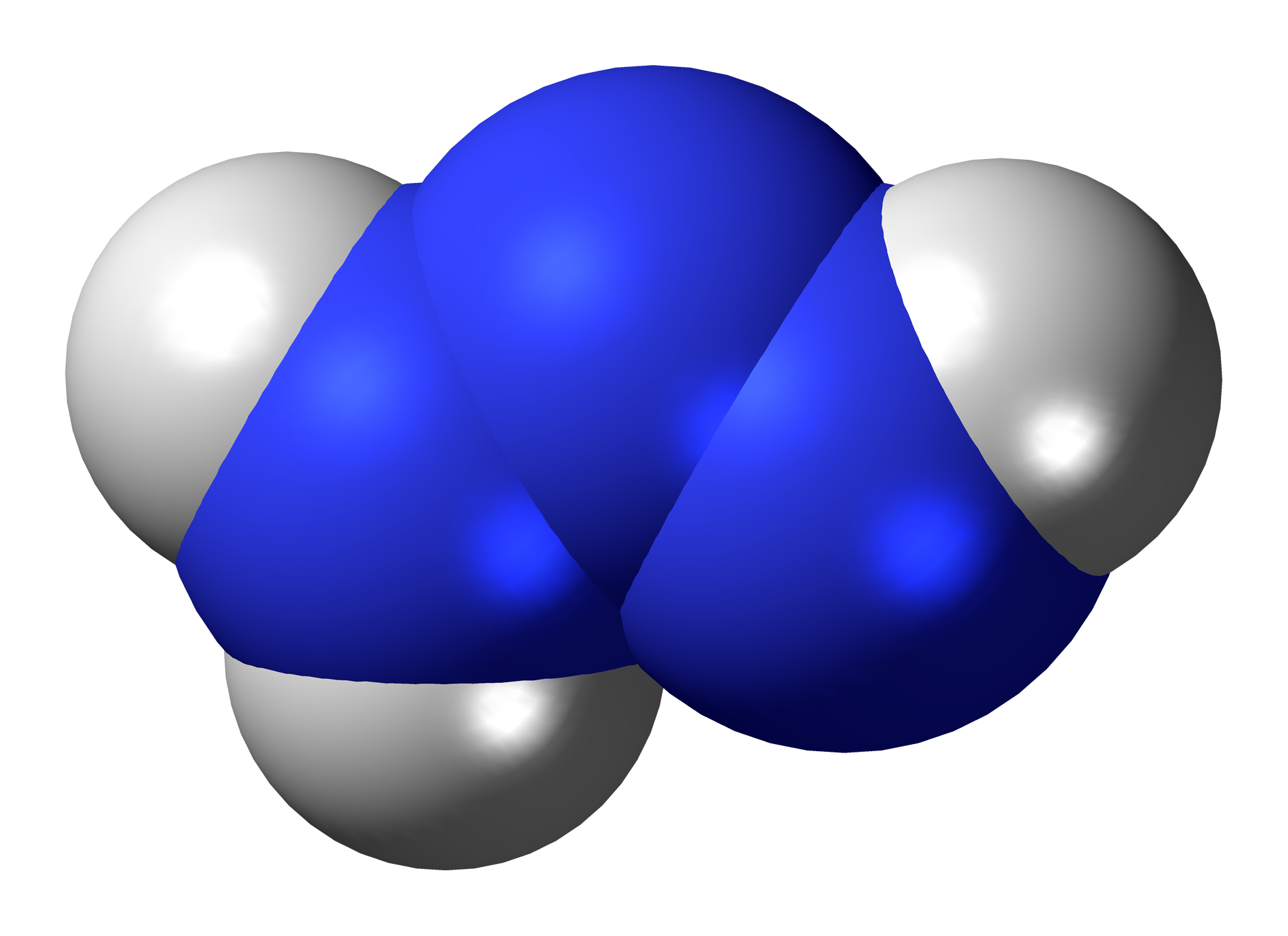

Names
- IUPAC name Triazene

Identifiers
CAS Number	15056-34-5
3D model (JSmol)	Interactive image
ChEBI	CHEBI:35468
ChemSpider	102956
Gmelin Reference	49028
PubChem CID	115034
UNII	H68LD449DN
CompTox Dashboard (EPA)	DTXSID20164572
- InChI: InChI=1S/H3N3/c1-3-2/h(H3,1,2) Key: AYNNSCRYTDRFCP-UHFFFAOYSA-N
- SMILES: NN=N

Properties
Chemical formula	H_{3}N_{3}
Molar mass	45.045 g·mol^{−1}

Hazards
NFPA 704 (fire diamond)	3 4 4

Related compounds
Other anions	Triphosphane
Related Binary azanes	ammonia diazane triazane
Related compounds	Diazene; Tetrazene
- Except where otherwise noted, data are given for materials in their standard state (at 25 °C [77 °F], 100 kPa). Infobox references

Triazene is an unsaturated inorganic compound having the chemical formula N_{3}H_{3}. It has one double bond and is the second-simplest member of the azene class of hydronitrogen compounds, after diimide. Triazenes are a class of organic compounds containing the functional group −N(H)−N=N−. Triazene, possibly along with its isomer triimide (HNNHNH), has been synthesized in electron-irradiated ices of ammonia and ammonia/dinitrogen and detected in the gas phase after sublimation.
