= Tetrazene =

Names
- IUPAC name (2E)-2-Tetraazene
- Other names 2-Tetrazene

Identifiers
CAS Number	54410-57-0 (2-tetrazene)
3D model (JSmol)	Interactive image
ChemSpider	4576001
PubChem CID	5463295 (2-tetrazene)
CompTox Dashboard (EPA)	DTXSID00969547
- InChI: InChI=1S/H4N4/c1-3-4-2/h(H2,1,4)(H2,2,3); Key: MAZKAODOCXYDCM-UHFFFAOYSA-N
- SMILES: N/N=N/N

Properties
Chemical formula	H_{4}N_{4}
Molar mass	60.060 g·mol^{−1}
Appearance	colorless

Hazards
- Occupational safety and health (OHS/OSH)
Main hazards	Explosive

Related compounds
Related binary azanes	Ammonia; Hydrazine; Triazane
Related compounds	Diazene; Triazene
- Except where otherwise noted, data are given for materials in their standard state (at 25 °C [77 °F], 100 kPa). verify (what is ?) Infobox references

Tetrazene is a chemical compound with the molecular formula H_{2}N−N=N−NH_{2}. It is a colorless explosive material. An analogue is the organosilicon derivative (tms)_{2}N−N=N−N(tms)_{2} where tms is trimethylsilyl. Isomeric with tetrazene is ammonium azide.

Tetrazene explosive, commonly known simply as tetrazene, is used for sensitization of priming compositions.

== Properties ==
Tetrazene has eleven isomers. The most stable of these is the straight-chain 2-tetrazene (H_{2}N−N=N−NH_{2}), having a standard heat of formation at 301.3 kJ/mol. The eleven isomers can be arranged into three groups: straight-chain tetrazenes, four-membered cyclotetrazane, and three-membered cyclotriazanes. Each straight-chain tetrazene isomer possesses one N=N double bond and two N−N single bonds. Tautomerizations do occur between the isomers. The ionic compound ammonium azide is also a constitutional isomer of tetrazene.

== Organometallic derivatives ==
A variety of coordination complexes are known for R_{2}N^{2−}_{4} (R = methyl, benzyl).
