= N-Heterocyclic carbene boryl anion =

Isoelectronic structure

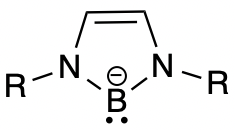
A Generic NHC Boryl Anion

An N-heterocyclic carbene boryl anion is an isoelectronic structure of an N-heterocyclic carbene (NHC), where the carbene carbon is replaced with a boron atom that has a −1 charge. NHC boryl anions have a planar geometry, and the boron atom is considered to be sp^{2}-hybridized. They serve as extremely strong bases, as they are very nucleophilic. They also have a very strong trans influence, due to the σ-donation coming from the boron atom. NHC boryl anions have stronger electron-releasing character when compared to normal NHCs. These characteristics make NHC boryl anions key ligands in many applications, such as polycyclic aromatic hydrocarbons, and more commonly low oxidation state main group element bonding.

== Synthesis ==
Ever since the first crystalline carbene structure was isolated by Arduengo in 1990, tuning different properties of NHCs has been a popular area of study in main group chemistry. The first NHC boryl anion was synthesized by Segawa in 2006. The precursor to the complex was first synthesized by a diimine reduction by magnesium followed by a reaction with BBr_{3}. The final complex was synthesized through cleavage on a boron–bromide bond in a bromo-diazaborole complex by lithium naphthalenide. This reaction made a boryllithium complex, where the boron atom shows strong structural similarity to a free boryl anion. These similarities show that boron has the anionic −1 charge and is recognized as an isoelectronic compound to a singlet carbene. The key to this synthesis was bulky R substituents on the nitrogen which prevented dimerization, something that is common in boron chemistry. These bulky substituents and low temperatures provided successful isolation of the species.

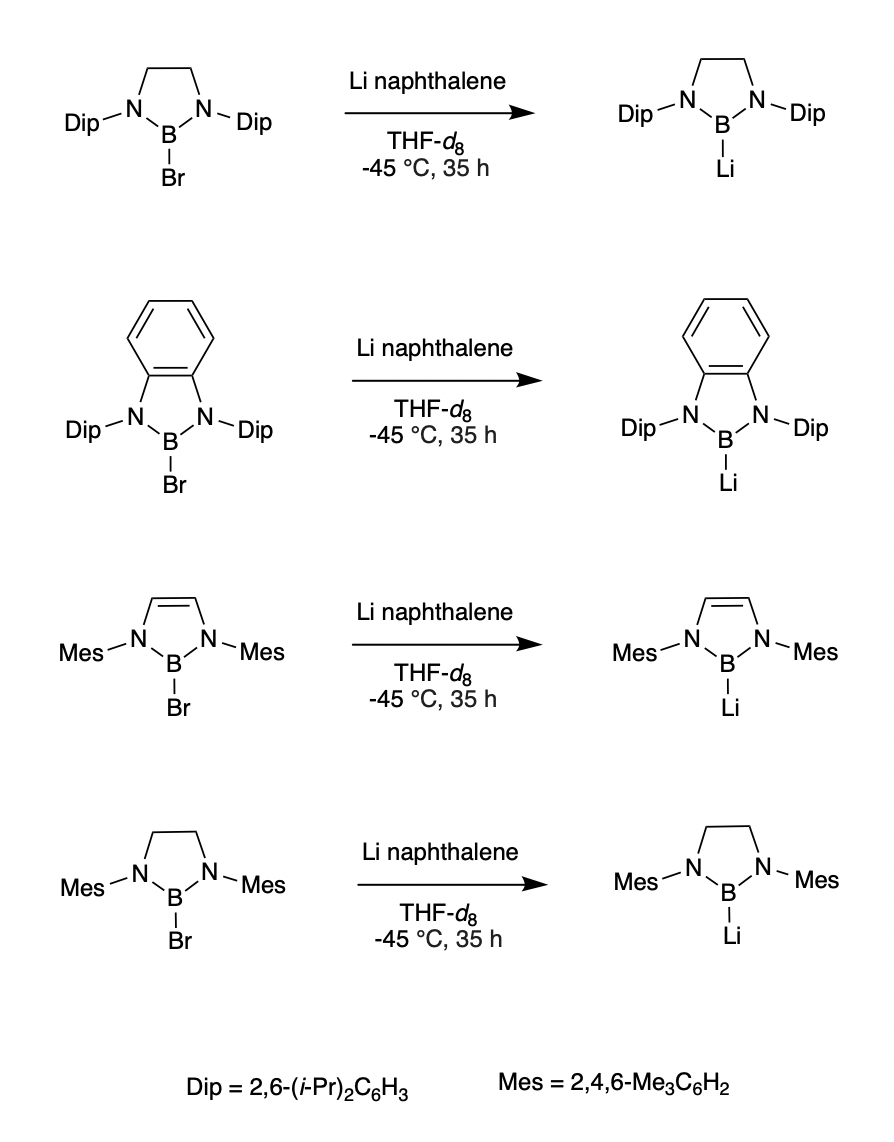
Different Boryllithium Backbones That Were Synthesized

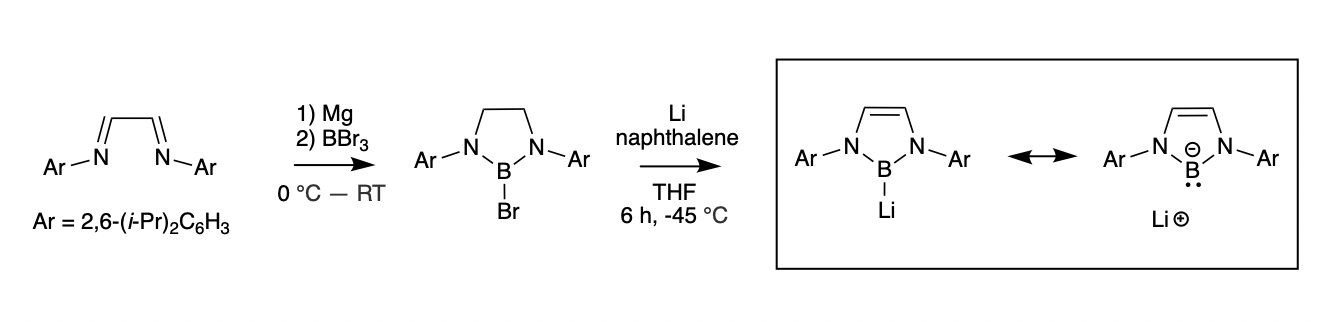
Synthesis of the First NHC Boryl Anion

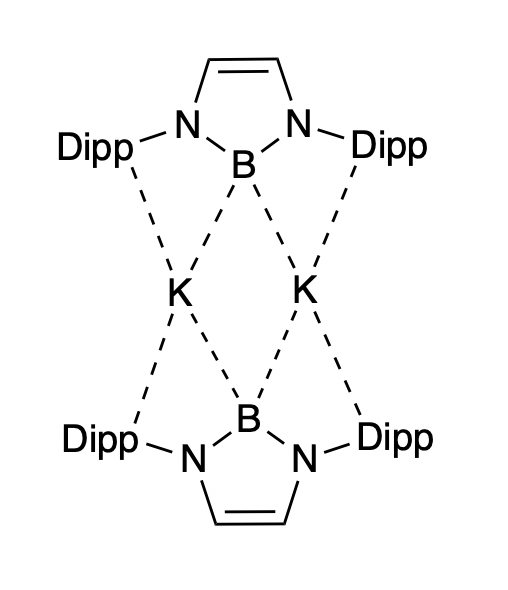
A "Naked" Boryl Anion

=== Differing boryllithium backbones ===
After the first synthesis of the NHC boryl anion, Segawa continued to synthesize other NHC boryl anions by switching the backbones of the complexes. In 2008, it was found that by using the same reducing conditions as the first boryl anions, many other NHC boryl anions could be synthesized.

=== The "naked" boryl anion ===
A "naked" boryl anion, in which there is no cation near the −1 boron, can be synthesized through an amide metathesis reaction. What is formed is a borylpotassium dimer, in which the K^{+} ions interact weakly with both the carbons on the substituents on the nitrogens and also the boron centers. The K−B bond distances are greater than 3.1 Å, which is much greater than the sum of the covalent radii. Additionally, the N−B−N bond angle is very close to the calculated gas-phase anion, leading to the conclusion that the boryl anion is as "free" as possible.

== Reactivity ==
NHC boryl ligands tend to be strong σ donors but π acceptors.

=== Bonding with group 1 and 2 elements ===
When the NHC boryl anion is in the form of a boryllithium salt, it has displayed reactivity with CO, one of the most important building blocks in the industrial field. The complex goes through an insertion reaction, where the CO is inserted into the B−Li bond to make a short-lived intermediate species. This reaction shows promising applications in carbonylative coupling reactions, where CO insertion is necessary.

Mechanism of CO Bond Insertion

B−Mg single bond formed using NHC boryl anion

In 2007, the first B-Mg single bond was synthesized using an NHC boryl anion as the ligand. The B−Mg bonds are slightly longer than the sum of the covalent radii, but this has been attributed to weakened Coulombic interaction due to coordination of the solvent, which was THF in this experiment. This solvent interaction also affects the geometry of the molecule, as the crystal structure shows that the Mg atom has a distorted sp^{3}-hybridized center. However, the results show that the Mg−B bond has ionic character and can be considered a single bond. Another Mg−B bond was synthesized by reacting the NHC boryl anion with a Mg compound in a 2:1 ratio. This Mg atom also had a distorted tetrahedral coordination, which was also attributed to the coordination of the solvent (THF).

NHC boryl anion reactivity with beryllium

The first Be−B bond was reported in 2014, however this bond showed more covalent character, rather than the ionic bond that was reported in the Mg analogue of this complex. This complex was formed by reacting two equivalents of the NHC boryl anion with BeCl_{2} using benzene as the solvent. In 2020, however, a very interesting reaction between the NHC boryl anion and Be was reported. In this case, the boryl anion was reacted with a Be complex, and rather than forming a bond to, and receiving σ-donation from the boron atom, it reacted with one of the carbons in the backbone of the anion. Although the mechanism of this reaction is unclear, it is believed that one of the backbone protons becomes deprotonated, allowing the Be to bind to the positively charged carbons. This compound is extremely stable even at room temperature, and more studies are being completed to further understand the mechanism of this reaction.

=== Bonding with main group elements ===
The NHC boryl anion has also been used to achieve B=B double bonds, but in a tetraborane species rather than the diborane molecule. For this synthesis, an extra boron atom was added to the NHC boryl anion, and then was reduced, forcing dimerization between the molecules and allowing for a H-bridged tetraborane species to occur. Although the complex is H-bridged, the inner B−B bond distance lies between reported double and triple bond lengths. Additionally, the NPA charges on the central B−B moiety are negative, showing that the boryl anions donate electron density, leading to the conclusion that a B=B double bond is occurring.

With specific reaction conditions, a disilane single or double bond can be achieved using the NHC boryl anion. To make a Si−Si single bond, a NHC boryl silane compound is reduced by KC_{8} in DME solvent. To make a Si=Si double bond, a slightly different NHC boryl silane compound is reduced in KC_{8} in THF solvent.

Disilane Complex

Disilene Complex

Disilyne Complex

Additionally, a dianionic disilyne (Si≡Si triple bond) was reported in the form of a Mg complex. Two equivalents of a NHC boryl silane compound is reduced with Mg in THF, leading to a Mg−Si−Si three-membered ring. The boryl anion groups are arranged in a cis formation, and the Si atoms have planar geometry. Additionally, the Si−Si bond length is calculated to be the sum of the covalent radii for a double bond, and the NPA charges show dianionic character on the Si atoms.

=== Bonding with transition metals ===
NHC boryl anions have also been investigated for their ability to activate C−H bonds and hydroboration activity, two things that were previously thought to only be completed by transition metal systems. Anionic boryl ligands can covalently bond to transition metals, which is different than how it bonds to main group elements (ionically). These boryl ligands σ-bond but also are able to receive π-back donation into the vacant p_{z} orbital that the boron has. It is said that boryl ligands, like NHC boryl anions, are the most effective ligand in controlling reactivity.

Many transition metal boryl complexes have been synthesized, including silver, gold, copper, and zinc. These complexes give insight into potential intermediates of transition metal catalyst reactions, and provide potential starting materials for both organic and inorganic synthetic chemistry.

Different Transition Metal Complexes

Group 12 metal bonding has almost exclusively had the metals in the +1 oxidation state, but NHC boryl anions have helped synthesize group 12 M−M bonds in the 0 oxidation state. Group 12 metals take part in very weak bonding in the 0 oxidation state due to the filled valence d-orbitals, when the metals have NHC boryl anion ligands, they are able to bond in the 0 oxidation state because of the increase electron density that is donated by the ligand. These molecules are synthesized by first have m-terphenyls as the ligands on the metal, and then an isolobal exchange occurs, placing the boryl ligands onto the metal and allowing for the metal to be in the 0 oxidation state.

== Polycyclic aromatic hydrocarbons ==
One of the most exciting applications for NHC boryl anions are their place in polycyclic aromatic hydrocarbons, or PAHs. PAHs are normally defined as a molecule that has two or more benzenoid rings and contain no other elements except hydrogen and carbon. They are highly fluorescent, and are naturally found in crude oil and other petrochemical products. It has been shown that replacing the end carbons with a B−N moiety expands the family of PAHs and can serve as functional materials.

PAH with NHC Boryl Anion Units

Placing boron into PAHs is known to improve and diversity the optoelectronic properties by reducing the LUMO energy level. This lowering of the LUMO energy increases acceptor ability by lowering the energy needed for absorption and emission. The fused NHC boryl anion units add an element of bifunctionality and induce π-conjugation because of the empty p_{z} orbital. The absorption and emission qualities of these molecules are very interesting. PAHs that have a pyrene core all fluoresce blue light under UV light, but their smaller and more planar counterparts had a variety of colors that are emitted. This change in color is attributed to the NHC boryl anion rings contributing more to the smaller PAHs, whereas in the pyrene core there is less effect coming from the boron ligand. These planar NHC boryl anion molecules are very promising in their application to functional materials because they emit light in the near-IR region.
