= Azane =

Acyclic saturated hydronitrogens

Chemical structure of ammonia, the simplest azane

Azanes /ˌæzeɪns/ are acyclic, saturated hydronitrogens, which means that they consist only of hydrogen and nitrogen atoms and all bonds are single bonds. They are therefore pnictogen hydrides. Because cyclic hydronitrogens are excluded by definition, the azanes comprise a homologous series of inorganic compounds with the general chemical formula N_{n}H_{n+2}.

Each nitrogen atom has three bonds (either N-H or N-N bonds), and each hydrogen atom is joined to a nitrogen atom (H-N bonds). A series of linked nitrogen atoms is known as the nitrogen skeleton or nitrogen backbone. The number of nitrogen atoms is used to define the size of the azane (e.g. N_{2}-azane).

The simplest possible azane (the parent molecule) is ammonia, NH_{3}. There is no limit to the number of nitrogen atoms that can be linked together, the only limitation being that the molecule is acyclic, is saturated, and is a hydronitrogen.

== Structure classification ==
Saturated hydronitrogens can be:

- linear (general formula N_{n}H_{n + 2}) wherein the nitrogen atoms are joined in a snakelike structure
- branched (general formula N_{n}H_{n + 2}, n > 3) wherein the nitrogen backbone splits off in one or more directions
- cyclic (general formula N_{n}H_{n}, n > 2) wherein the nitrogen backbone is linked so as to form a loop.

According to IUPAC definitions, the former two are azanes, whereas the third group is called cycloazanes. Saturated hydronitrogens can also combine any of the linear, cyclic (e.g. polycyclic), and branching structures, and they are still azanes (no general formula) as long as they are acyclic (i.e., having no loops). They also have single covalent bonds between their nitrogens.

== Isomerism ==
Azanes with more than three nitrogen atoms can be arranged in various different ways, forming structural isomers. The simplest isomer of an azane is the one in which the nitrogen atoms are arranged in a single chain with no branches. This isomer is sometimes called the n-isomer (n for "normal", although it is not necessarily the most common). However the chain of nitrogen atoms may also be branched at one or more points. The number of possible isomers increases rapidly with the number of nitrogen atoms.

Due to the low energy of inversion, unsubstituted branched azanes cannot be chiral. In addition to these isomers, the chain of nitrogen atoms may form one or more loops. Such compounds are called cycloazanes.

== Nomenclature ==
The IUPAC nomenclature systematically naming nitrogen compounds by identifying hydronitrogen chains, analogous to the alkane nomenclature. Unbranched, saturated hydronitrogen chains are named with a Greek numerical prefix for the number of nitrogens and the suffix "-azane" for hydronitrogens with single bonds, or "-azene" for those with double bonds.

=== Linear azanes ===
Straight-chain azanes are sometimes indicated by the prefix n- (for normal) where a non-linear isomer exists. Although this is not strictly necessary, the usage is common in cases where there is an important difference in properties between the straight-chain and branched-chain isomers.

The members of the series (in terms of number of nitrogen atoms) are named as follows:

azane (or ammonia), NH_{3} - one nitrogen and three hydrogen
diazane (or hydrazine), N_{2}H_{4} - two nitrogen and four hydrogen
triazane, N_{3}H_{5} - three nitrogen and five hydrogen

Azanes with three or more nitrogen atoms are named by adding the suffix -azane to the appropriate numerical multiplier prefix. Hence, triazane, N_{3}H_{5}; tetrazane or tetraazane, N_{4}H_{6}; pentazane or pentaazane, N_{5}H_{7}; hexazane or hexaazane, N_{6}H_{8}; etc. The prefix is generally Greek, with the exceptions of nonaazane which has a Latin prefix, and undecaazane and tridecaazane which have mixed-language prefixes.

== Hazards ==
Ammonia is explosive when mixed with air (15 – 25%). Other lower azanes can also form explosive mixtures with air. The lighter liquid azanes are highly flammable; this risk increases with the length of the nitrogen chain. One consideration for detection and risk control is that ammonia is lighter than air, creating the possibility of accumulation on ceilings.

== Related and derived hydronitrogens ==
Related to the azanes are a homologous series of functional groups, side-chains, or radicals with the general chemical formula N_{n}H_{n+1}. Examples include azanyl (NH_{2}) and hydrazinyl. This group is generally abbreviated with the symbol N.
