= Bismuth tribromide =

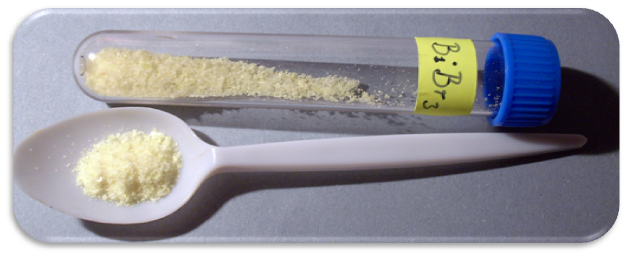
- Bismuth bromide

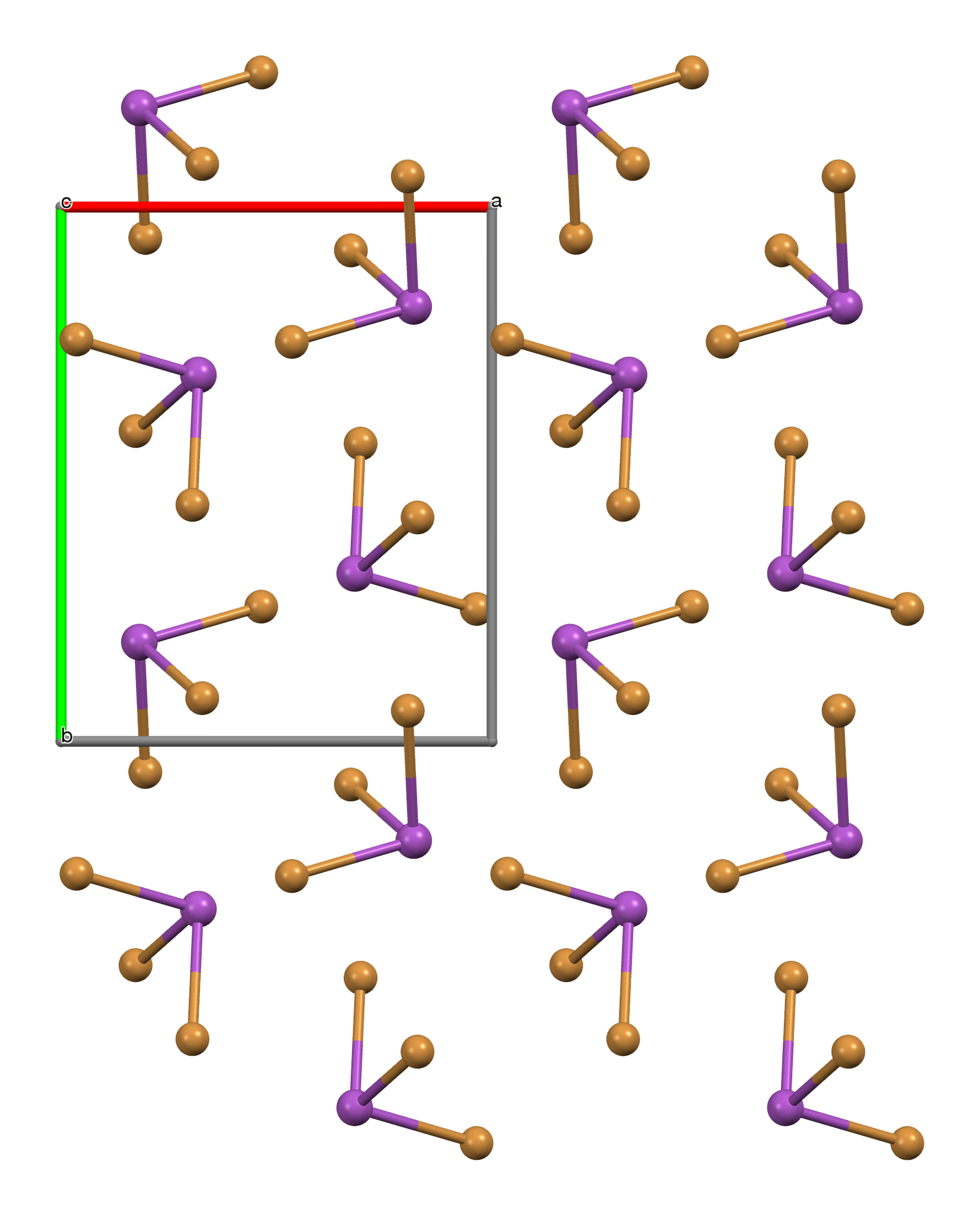
α polymorph
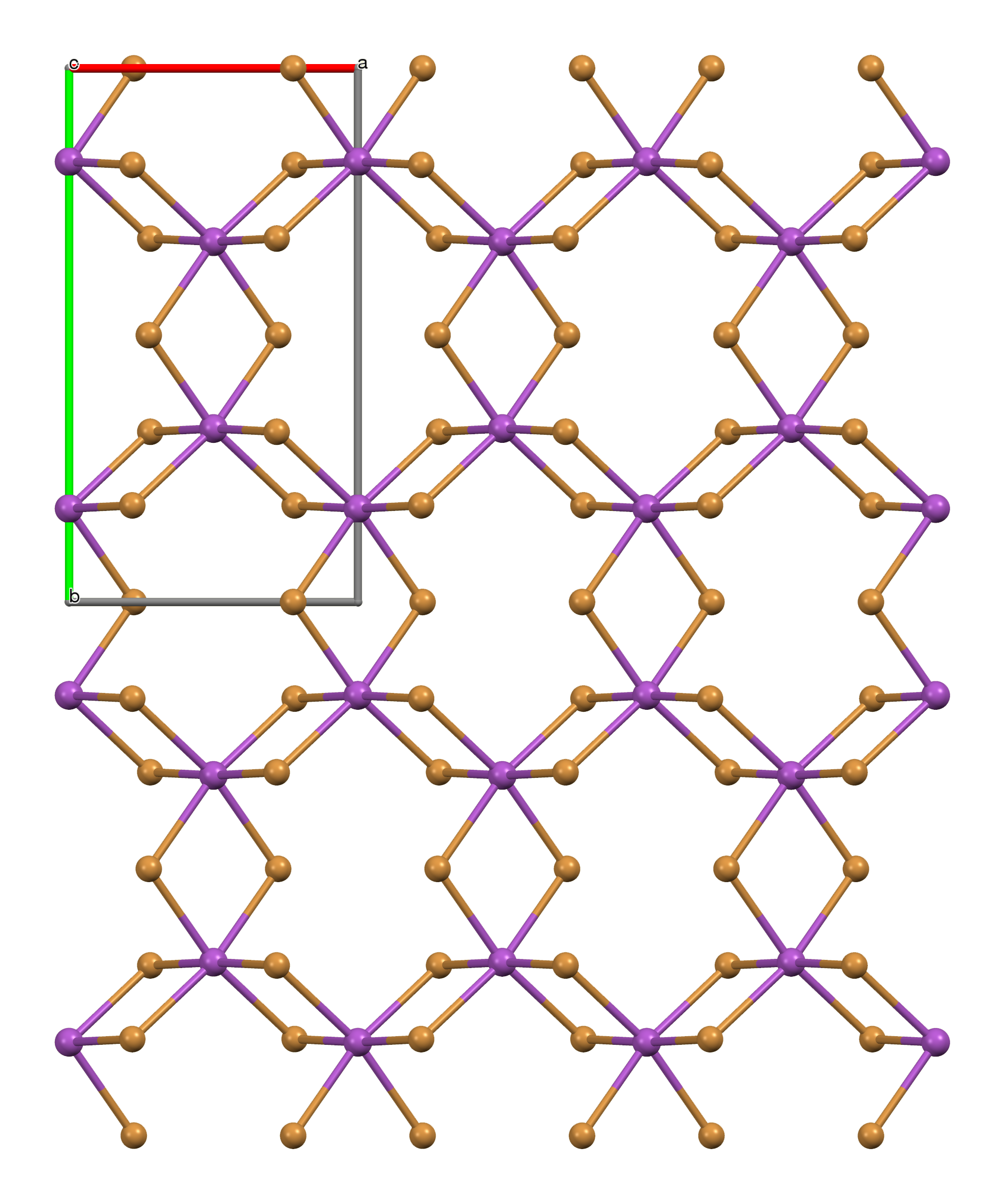
β polymorph

Names
- IUPAC name bismuth bromide
- Other names bismuth tribromide tribromobismuth tribromobismuthine tribromobismuthane bismuth(III) bromide

Identifiers
CAS Number	7787-58-8
3D model (JSmol)	Interactive image
ChemSpider	74210
ECHA InfoCard	100.029.201
EC Number	232-121-1
PubChem CID	82232
UNII	DT59198T2X
CompTox Dashboard (EPA)	DTXSID8064850
- InChI: InChI=1S/Bi.3BrH/h;3*1H/q+3;;;/p-3 Key: TXKAQZRUJUNDHI-UHFFFAOYSA-K; InChI=1/Bi.3BrH/h;3*1H/q+3;;;/p-3 Key: TXKAQZRUJUNDHI-DFZHHIFOAX
- SMILES: Br[Bi](Br)Br

Properties
Chemical formula	BiBr_{3}
Molar mass	448.692 g·mol^{−1}
Appearance	white to light yellow or golden deliquescent crystals
Density	5.72 g/cm^{3} at 25 °C
Melting point	219 °C (426 °F; 492 K)
Boiling point	462 °C (864 °F; 735 K)
Solubility in water	Soluble, slow hydrolysis
Solubility	diethyl ether, THF
Magnetic susceptibility (χ)	−147.0·10^{−6} cm^{3}/mol

Thermochemistry
Std enthalpy of formation (Δ_{f}H^{⦵}_{298})	−276

Hazards
- Occupational safety and health (OHS/OSH)
Main hazards	corrosive
- GHS labelling
Pictograms	(GHS05: Corrosive)
Signal word	Danger
Hazard statements	H314
Precautionary statements	P260, P264, P280, P301+P330+P331, P303+P361+P353, P304+P340, P305+P351+P338, P310, P321, P363, P405, P501
NFPA 704 (fire diamond)	3 0 1

Related compounds
Other anions	bismuth trifluoride bismuth trichloride bismuth triiodide
Other cations	nitrogen tribromide phosphorus tribromide arsenic tribromide antimony tribromide aluminium tribromide iron(III) bromide
- Except where otherwise noted, data are given for materials in their standard state (at 25 °C [77 °F], 100 kPa). Infobox references

Bismuth tribromide is an inorganic compound of bismuth and bromine with the chemical formula BiBr_{3}.

== Preparation ==
It may be formed by the reaction of bismuth oxide and hydrobromic acid.

Bi_{2}O_{3} + 6 HBr ⇌ 2 BiBr_{3} + 3 H_{2}O

Bismuth tribromide can also be produced by the direct oxidation of bismuth in bromine.

2 Bi + 3 Br_{2} → 2 BiBr_{3}

== Structure ==
Bismuth tribromide adopts two different structures in the solid state: a low-temperature polymorph α-BiBr_{3} that is stable below 158 °C and a high-temperature polymorph β-BiBr_{3} that is stable above this temperature. Both polymorphs are monoclinic, but α-BiBr_{3} is in space group P2_{1}/a whereas β-BiBr_{3} is in C2/m. α-BiBr_{3} consists of pyramidal molecules whereas β-BiBr_{3} is polymeric and adopts the AlCl_{3} structure. BiBr_{3} is the only group 15 trihalide that can adopt both molecular and polymeric structures.

== Reactivity ==
Bismuth bromide is highly water-soluble. It is a Lewis acid and accepts bromide ions to form monomeric and oligomeric anionic complexes (bromobismuthates), e.g. [BiBr_{6}]^{3−}, [Bi_{2}Br_{10}]^{4−}, (BiBr^{−}_{4})_{n} and (BiBr^{2−}_{5})_{n}.
