= Bismuth(III) iodide =

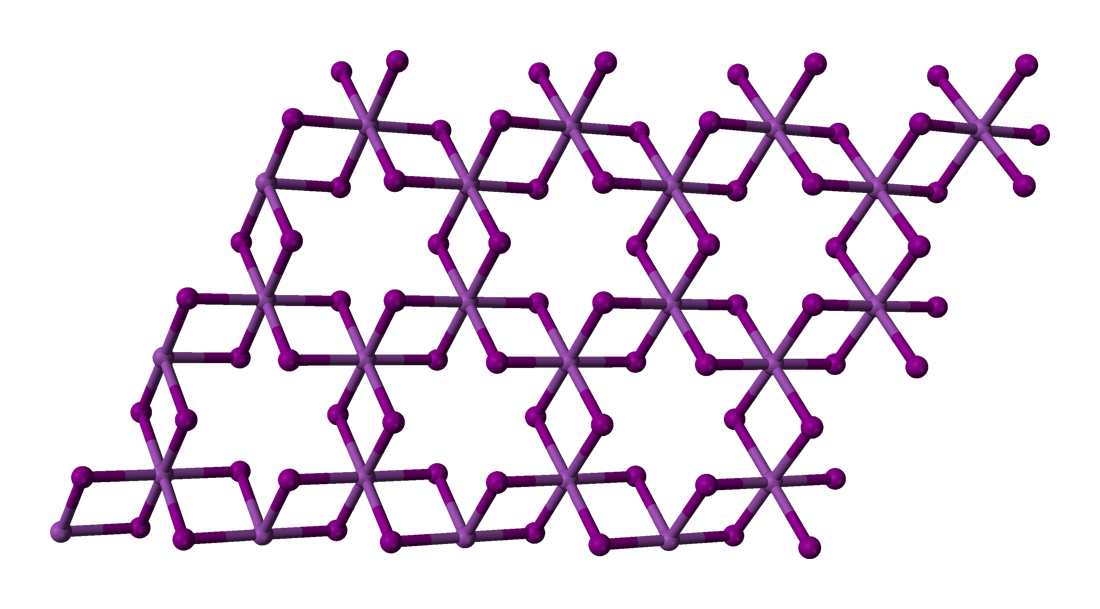

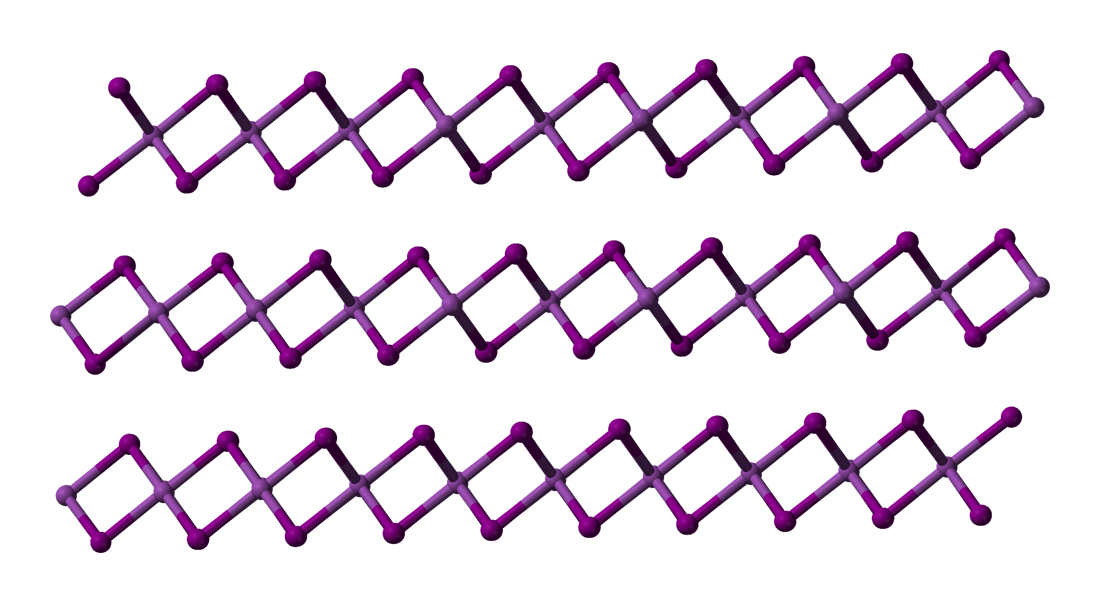

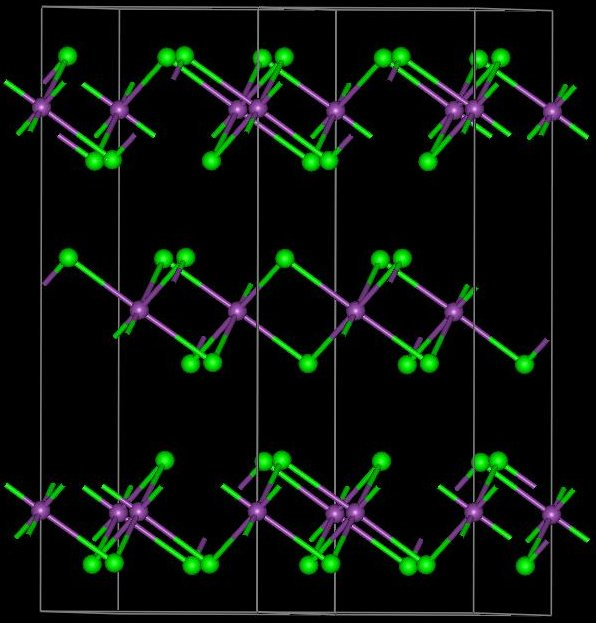

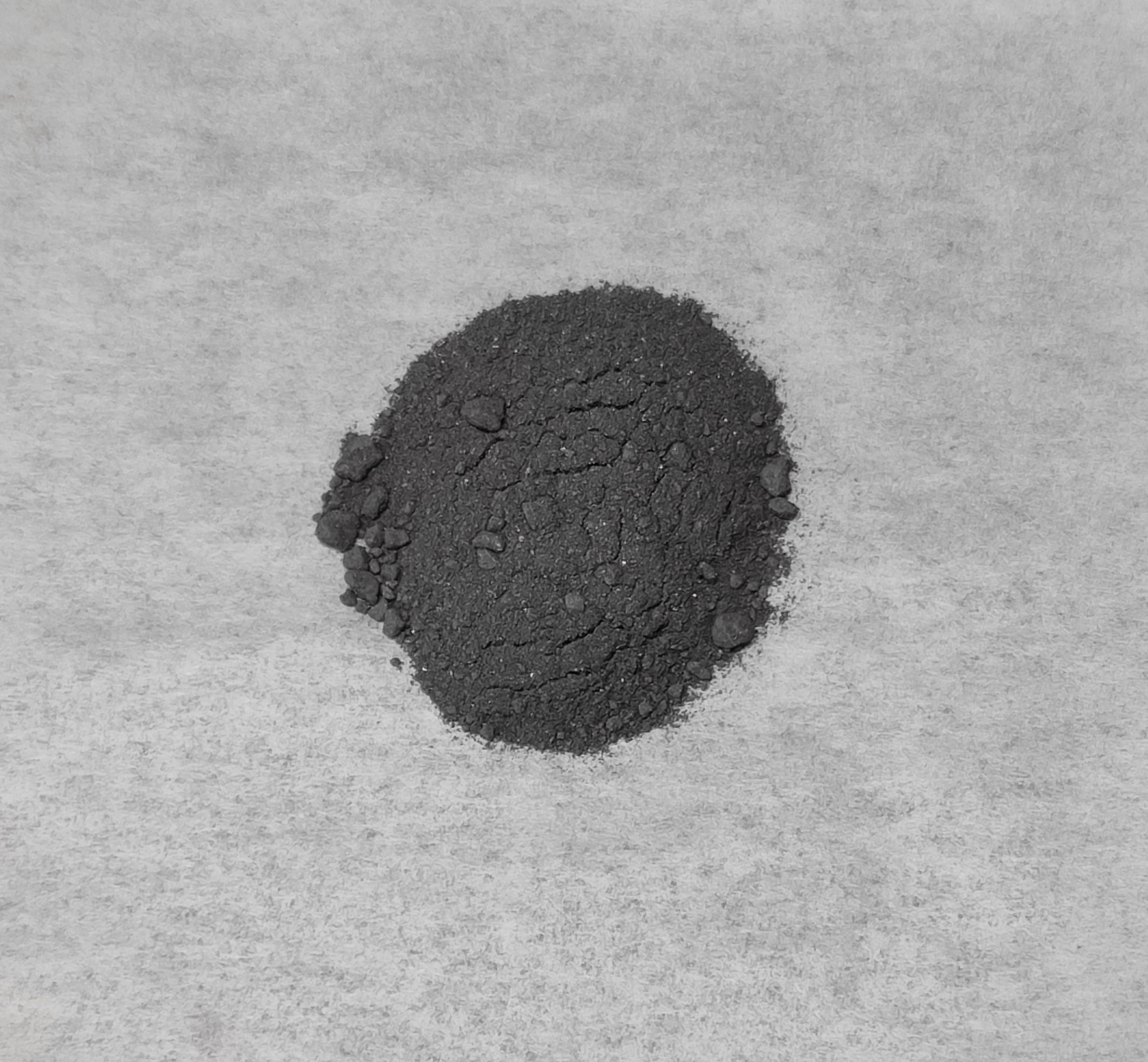

Names
- IUPAC name Bismuth(III) iodide
- Other names Bismuth iodide, bismuth triiodide

Identifiers
CAS Number	7787-64-6
3D model (JSmol)	Interactive image
ChemSpider	21172753
ECHA InfoCard	100.029.207
EC Number	232-127-4
PubChem CID	111042
UNII	BGX9X3FOLL
CompTox Dashboard (EPA)	DTXSID3064853
- InChI: InChI=1/Bi.3HI.3H/h;3*1H;;;/q+3;;;;;;/p-3/rBiH3.3HI/h1H3;3*1H/q+3;;;/p-3 Key: HXTWPIJUKIDKIH-ZPTXHWADAA
- SMILES: [I-].[I-].[I-].[BiH3+3]

Properties
Chemical formula	BiI_{3}
Molar mass	589.69 g/mol
Appearance	Greenish-black crystals
Density	5.778 g/cm^{3}
Melting point	408.6 °C (767.5 °F; 681.8 K)
Boiling point	542 °C (1,008 °F; 815 K)
Solubility in water	0.7761 mg/100 mL (20 °C)
Solubility product (K_{sp})	7.71×10^{−19}
Solubility	50 g/100 mL ethanol 50 g/100 mL 2 M hydrochloric acid
Magnetic susceptibility (χ)	−200.5·10^{−6} cm^{3}/mol

Structure
Crystal structure	Trigonal, hR24
Space group	R-3, No. 148

Hazards
- GHS labelling
Pictograms	(GHS05: Corrosive)
Signal word	Danger
Hazard statements	H314
Precautionary statements	P260, P264, P280, P301+P330+P331, P303+P361+P353, P304+P340, P305+P351+P338, P310, P321, P363, P405, P501
NFPA 704 (fire diamond)	2 0 1

Related compounds
Other anions	Bismuth(III) fluoride Bismuth(III) chloride Bismuth(III) bromide
Other cations	Nitrogen triiodide Phosphorus triiodide Arsenic triiodide Antimony triiodide
- Except where otherwise noted, data are given for materials in their standard state (at 25 °C [77 °F], 100 kPa). Infobox references

Bismuth(III) iodide is the inorganic compound with the formula BiI_{3}. This gray-black salt is the product of the reaction of bismuth and iodine, which once was of interest in qualitative inorganic analysis.

Bismuth(III) iodide adopts a distinctive crystal structure, with iodide centres occupying a hexagonally closest-packed lattice, and bismuth centres occupying either none or two-thirds of the octahedral holes (alternating by layer), therefore it is said to occupy one third of the total octahedral holes.

== Synthesis ==
Bismuth(III) iodide forms upon heating an intimate mixture of iodine and bismuth powder:

2 Bi + 3 I_{2} → 2 BiI_{3}

BiI_{3} can also be made by the reaction of bismuth oxide with aqueous hydroiodic acid:

Bi_{2}O_{3}(s) + 6 HI(aq) → 2 BiI_{3}(s) + 3 H_{2}O(l)

== Reactions ==
Since bismuth(III) iodide is insoluble in water, an aqueous solution can be tested for the presence of Bi^{3+} ions by adding a source of iodide such as potassium iodide. A black precipitate of bismuth(III) iodide indicates a positive test.

Bismuth(III) iodide forms pentaiodobismuth(III) anions when heated with halide donors:

2 NaI + BiI_{3} → Na_{2}[BiI_{5}]

Bismuth(III) iodide catalyzes the Mukaiyama aldol reaction. Bi(III) is also used in a Barbier type allylation of carbonyl compounds in combination with a reducing agent such as zinc or magnesium.
