= Antimony tribromide =

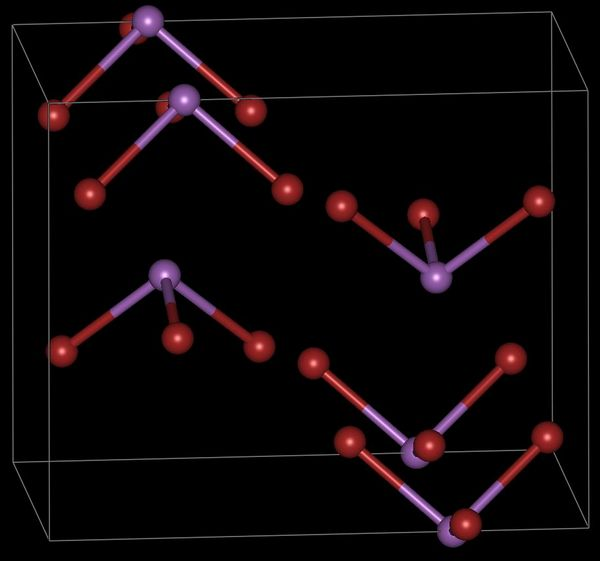

Names
- IUPAC name tribromostibane
- Other names Antimony(III) bromide

Identifiers
CAS Number	7789-61-9
3D model (JSmol)	Interactive image; Interactive image
ChemSpider	23017
ECHA InfoCard	100.029.254
EC Number	232-179-8
PubChem CID	24615
RTECS number	CC4400000
UNII	6PM239QD86
UN number	1549
CompTox Dashboard (EPA)	DTXSID6064870
- InChI: InChI=1S/3BrH.Sb/h3*1H;/q;;;+3/p-3 Key: RPJGYLSSECYURW-UHFFFAOYSA-K; InChI=1/3BrH.Sb.3H/h3*1H;;;;/q;;;+3;;;/p-3/r3BrH.H3Sb/h3*1H;1H3/q;;;+3/p-3 Key: BJUAQAQGPWXYGO-DAEPFFQNAU; InChI=1/3BrH.Sb/h3*1H;/q;;;+3/p-3 Key: RPJGYLSSECYURW-DFZHHIFOAI
- SMILES: [Br-].[Br-].[Br-].[SbH3+3]; Br[Sb](Br)Br

Properties
Chemical formula	SbBr_{3}
Molar mass	361.472 g/mol
Appearance	colorless to yellow crystals hygroscopic
Density	4.35 g/cm^{3}
Melting point	96.6 °C (205.9 °F; 369.8 K)
Boiling point	288 °C (550 °F; 561 K)
Solubility in water	soluble, partial hydrolysis
Solubility	soluble in dilute HCl, HBr, CS_{2}, acetone, benzene, chloroform, ammonia, alcohol
Magnetic susceptibility (χ)	−115.0·10^{−6} cm^{3}/mol
Refractive index (n_{D})	1.74
Dipole moment	2.47 D

Structure
Crystal structure	Orthorhombic, oP16, SpaceGroup = Pnma, No. 62 (β form)

Thermochemistry
Heat capacity (C)	96 J/mol K
Std enthalpy of formation (Δ_{f}H^{⦵}_{298})	−259 kJ/mol

Hazards
- GHS labelling
Pictograms	(GHS07: Exclamation mark) (GHS09: Environmental hazard)
Signal word	Warning
Hazard statements	H302, H332, H411
Precautionary statements	P261, P264, P270, P271, P273, P301+P312, P304+P312, P304+P340, P312, P330, P391, P501
- Lethal dose or concentration (LD, LC)
LD_{50} (median dose)	7000 mg/kg
- NIOSH (US health exposure limits)
PEL (Permissible)	TWA 0.5 mg/m^{3} (as Sb)
REL (Recommended)	TWA 0.5 mg/m^{3} (as Sb)

Related compounds
Other anions	Antimony trifluoride Antimony trichloride Antimony triiodide
Other cations	Nitrogen tribromide Phosphorus tribromide Arsenic tribromide Bismuth bromide
- Except where otherwise noted, data are given for materials in their standard state (at 25 °C [77 °F], 100 kPa). verify (what is ?) Infobox references

Antimony tribromide (SbBr_{3}) is a chemical compound containing antimony in its +3 oxidation state.

== Production ==
Antimony tribromide may be made by the reaction of antimony with elemental bromine, or by the reaction of antimony trioxide with hydrobromic acid.

Alternatively, it can be prepared by the action of bromine on a mixture of antimony sulfide and antimony trioxide at 250 °C.

== Chemical properties ==
Antimony tribromide has two crystalline forms, both having orthorhombic symmetries. When a warm carbon disulfide solution of SbBr_{3} is rapidly cooled, it crystallizes into the needle-like α-SbBr_{3}, which then slowly converts to the more stable β form.

Antimony tribromide hydrolyzes in water to form hydrobromic acid and antimony trioxide:

2 SbBr_{3} + 3 H_{2}O → Sb_{2}O_{3} + 6 HBr

== Uses ==
It can be added to polymers such as polyethylene as a fire retardant. It is also used in the production of other antimony compounds, in chemical analysis, as a mordant, and in dyeing.
