= Bismuth arsenide =

Identifiers
CAS Number	12322-23-5
3D model (JSmol)	Interactive image
- InChI: InChI=1S/As.Bi Key: XCUCRSRQUDMZLU-UHFFFAOYSA-N
- SMILES: [Bi]#[As]

Properties
Chemical formula	BiAs
Molar mass	283.9
Appearance	solid
- Except where otherwise noted, data are given for materials in their standard state (at 25 °C [77 °F], 100 kPa). Infobox references

Bismuth arsenide is an inorganic compound, with the chemical formula BiAs. Its α-modification and β-modification have been reported in theoretical calculations.

== Preparation ==
Bismuth arsenide can be prepared by reacting bismuth chloride and tris(trimethylsilyl)arsenic in toluene at room temperature:

BiCl_{3} + As[Si(CH_{3})_{3}]_{3} → BiAs + 3(CH_{3})_{3}SiCl
