= Antimony triiodide =

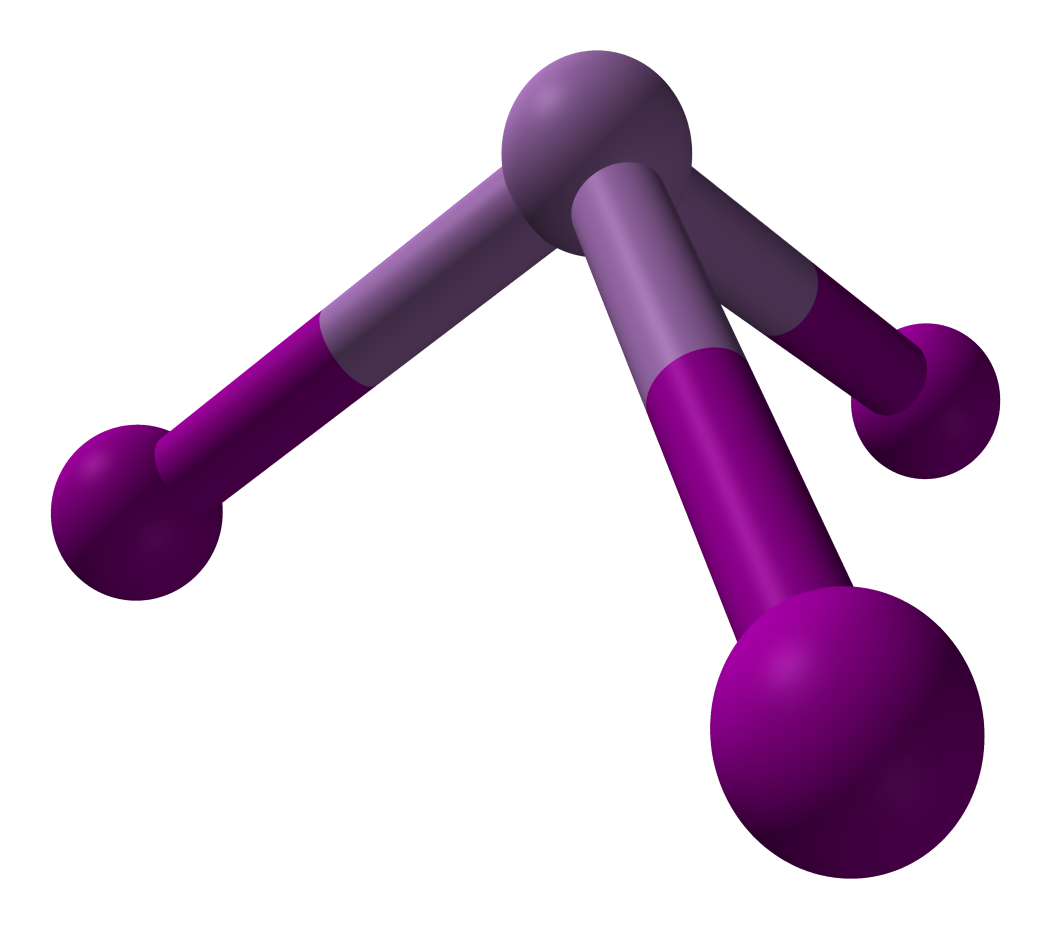

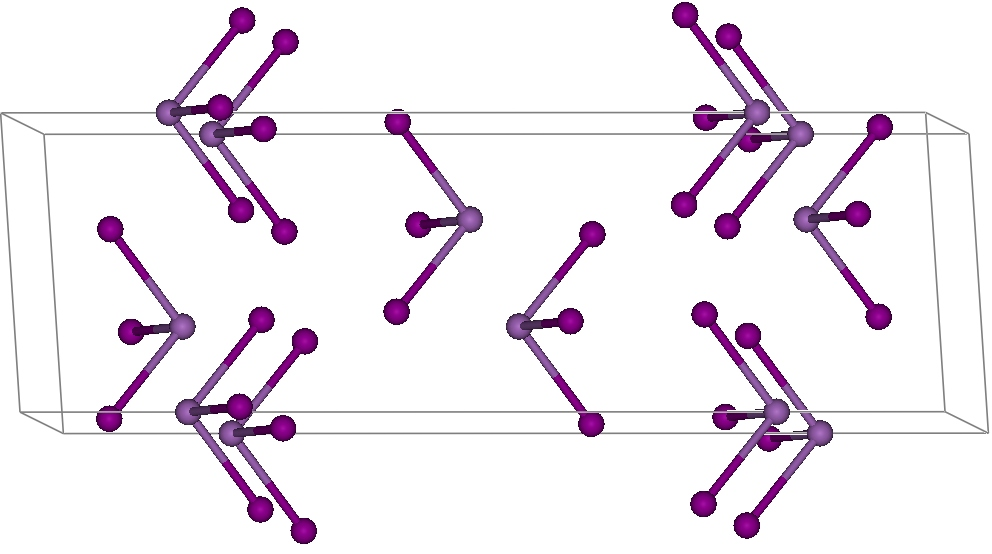

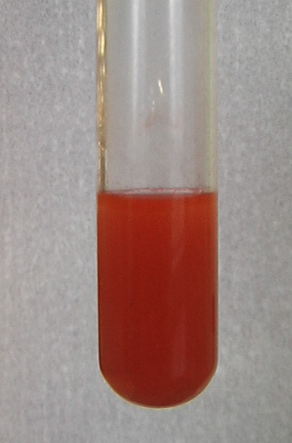

Names
- IUPAC name Antimony triiodide, Antimony(III) iodide
- Systematic IUPAC name Triiodostibane

Identifiers
CAS Number	7790-44-5
3D model (JSmol)	Interactive image; Interactive image
ChemSpider	23032
ECHA InfoCard	100.029.278
EC Number	232-205-8
PubChem CID	24630
UNII	52ZE5Y9Y82
CompTox Dashboard (EPA)	DTXSID1064875
- InChI: InChI=1S/3HI.Sb/h3*1H;/q;;;+3/p-3 Key: KWQLUUQBTAXYCB-UHFFFAOYSA-K; InChI=1/3HI.Sb.3H/h3*1H;;;;/q;;;+3;;;/p-3/r3HI.H3Sb/h3*1H;1H3/q;;;+3/p-3 Key: JYIUOADDPFDEAV-GODZFDHEAT; InChI=1/3HI.Sb/h3*1H;/q;;;+3/p-3 Key: KWQLUUQBTAXYCB-DFZHHIFOAA
- SMILES: [SbH3+3].[I-].[I-].[I-]; I[Sb](I)I

Properties
Chemical formula	I_{3}Sb
Molar mass	502.473 g·mol^{−1}
Appearance	red crystals
Density	4.921 g/cm^{3}
Melting point	170.5 °C (338.9 °F; 443.6 K)
Boiling point	401.6 °C (754.9 °F; 674.8 K)
Solubility in water	soluble, partially hydrolyses
Solubility	soluble in benzene, alcohol, acetone, CS_{2}, HCl, KI, SnCl_{4}, C_{2}H_{7}N, HI, alkali metal triiodides insoluble in CHCl_{3}, CCl_{4}
Solubility in diiodomethane	10.15% v/v (12 °C)
Magnetic susceptibility (χ)	−147.0·10^{−6} cm^{3}/mol

Structure
Crystal structure	Rhombohedral, hR24,
Space group	R-3, No. 148
Dipole moment	1.58 D

Thermochemistry
Heat capacity (C)	81.6 J/mol·K (gas)
Std enthalpy of formation (Δ_{f}H^{⦵}_{298})	−100.4 kJ/mol

Hazards
- GHS labelling
Pictograms	(GHS07: Exclamation mark) (GHS09: Environmental hazard)
Signal word	Warning
Hazard statements	H302, H332, H411
Precautionary statements	P273
- NIOSH (US health exposure limits)
PEL (Permissible)	TWA 0.5 mg/m^{3} (as Sb)
REL (Recommended)	TWA 0.5 mg/m^{3} (as Sb)

Related compounds
Other anions	Antimony trifluoride Antimony trichloride Antimony tribromide
Other cations	Nitrogen triiodide Phosphorus triiodide Arsenic triiodide Bismuth iodide
- Except where otherwise noted, data are given for materials in their standard state (at 25 °C [77 °F], 100 kPa). verify (what is ?) Infobox references

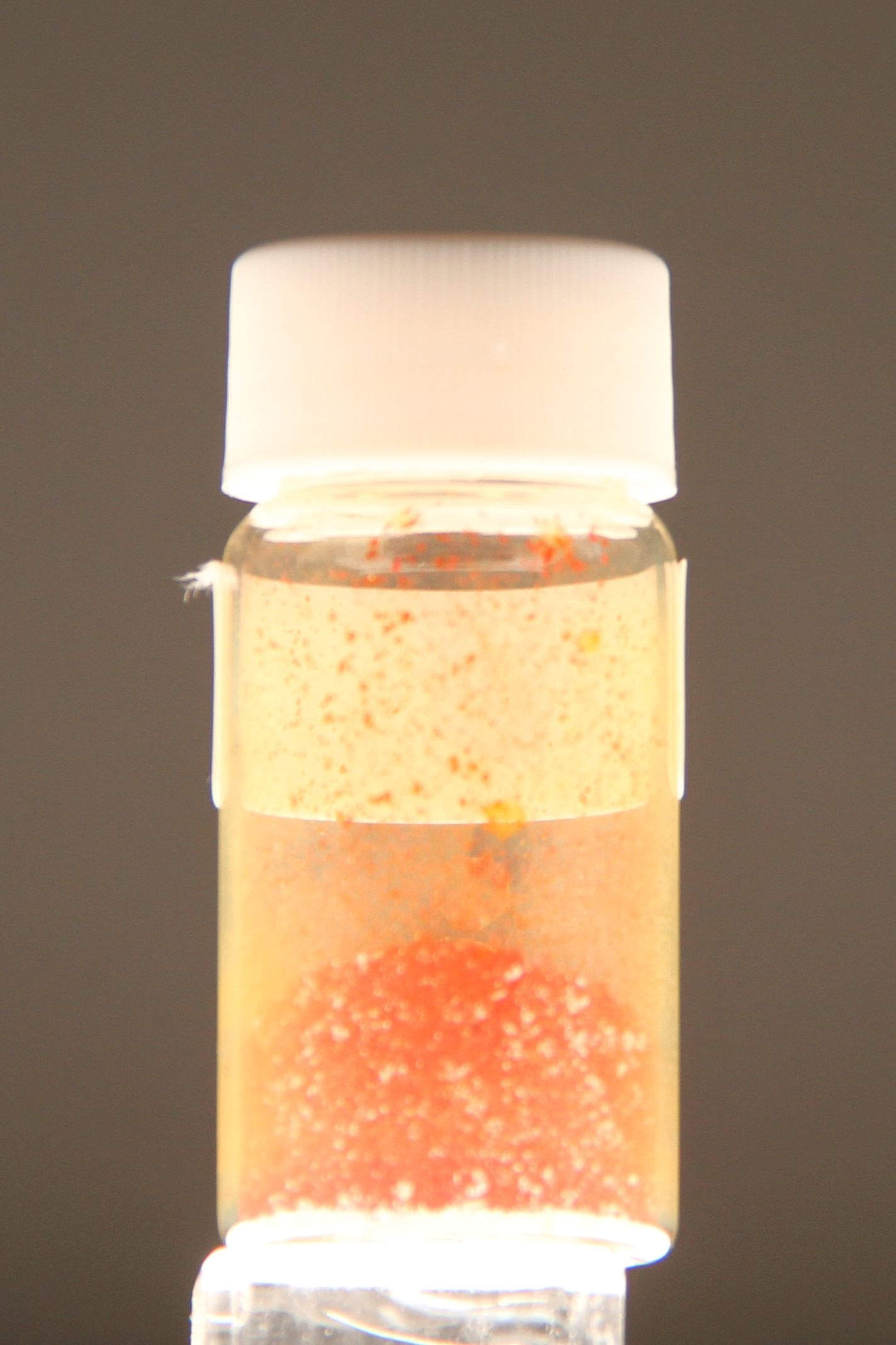
Antimony triiodide crystalline

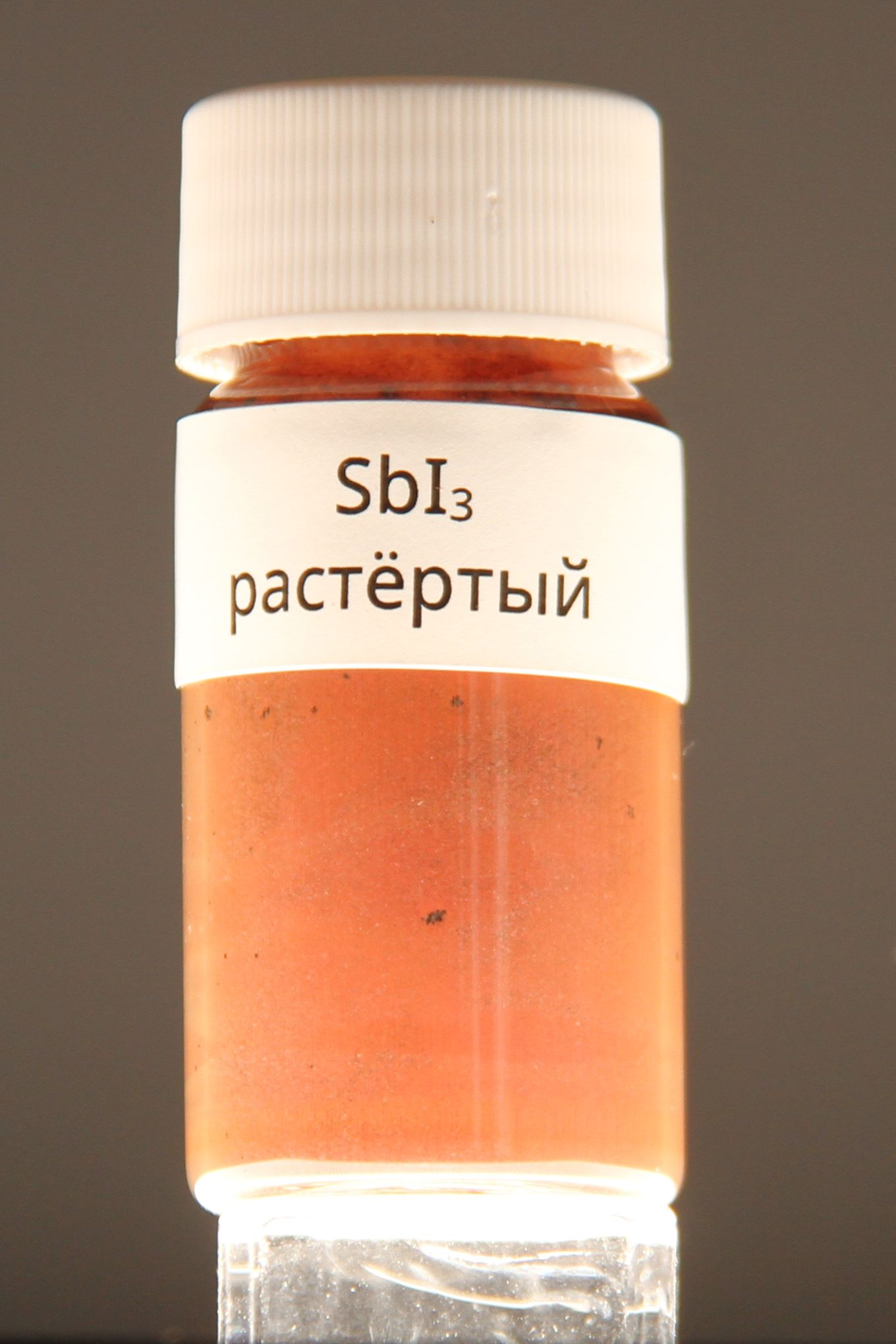
Antimony triiodide milled

Antimony triiodide is the chemical compound with the formula SbI_{3}. This ruby-red solid is the only characterized "binary" iodide of antimony, i.e. the sole compound isolated with the formula Sb_{x}I_{y}. It contains antimony in its +3 oxidation state. Like many iodides of the heavier main group elements, its structure depends on the phase. Gaseous SbI_{3} is a molecular, pyramidal species as anticipated by VSEPR theory. In the solid state, however, the Sb center is surrounded by an octahedron of six iodide ligands, three of which are closer and three more distant. For the related compound BiI_{3}, all six Bi—I distances are equal.

== Production ==
It may be formed by the reaction of antimony with elemental iodine, or the reaction of antimony trioxide with hydroiodic acid.

Alternatively, it may be prepared by the interaction of antimony and iodine in boiling benzene or tetrachloroethane.

== Uses ==
SbI_{3} has been used as a dopant in the preparation of thermoelectric materials.
