= Hexachlorodisiloxane =

Identifiers
CAS Number	14986-21-1
3D model (JSmol)	Interactive image
ChemSpider	76449
ECHA InfoCard	100.035.504
EC Number	239-070-4
PubChem CID	84745
UNII	C3D4AS2UNH
CompTox Dashboard (EPA)	DTXSID2065836
- InChI: InChI=1S/Cl6OSi2/c1-8(2,3)7-9(4,5)6 Key: QHAHOIWVGZZELU-UHFFFAOYSA-N
- SMILES: O([Si](Cl)(Cl)Cl)[Si](Cl)(Cl)Cl

Properties
Chemical formula	Cl_{6}OSi_{2}
Molar mass	284.87 g·mol^{−1}
Density	1.575 g/cm^{3}
Melting point	−33 °C (−27 °F; 240 K)
Boiling point	137 °C (279 °F; 410 K)

Hazards
- GHS labelling
Pictograms	(GHS02: Flammable) (GHS05: Corrosive)
Signal word	Danger
Hazard statements	H223, H314, H335

Related compounds
Other anions	Hexafluorodisiloxane
Other cations	Perchloromethylether
- Except where otherwise noted, data are given for materials in their standard state (at 25 °C [77 °F], 100 kPa). Infobox references

Hexachlorodisiloxane is a chemical compound composed of chlorine, silicon, and oxygen. Structurally, it is the symmetrical ether of two trichlorosilyl groups, and can be synthesized via high-temperature oxidation of silicon tetrachloride:
$$\ce{2SiCl4 + O2 ->[950-970^\circ\text{C}] 2(SiCl3)2O + Cl2}$$

At room temperature, it is a colorless liquid that hydrolyzes upon exposure to water to give silicon dioxide and hydrochloric acid:
$$\ce{(SiCl3)2O + 3H2O -> 2SiO2 + 6HCl}$$
Intense heat evinces a similar decomposition:
$$\ce{2(SiCl3)2O ->[\Delta] SiO2{} + 3SiCl4}$$

Reaction with antimony trifluoride gives the analogous hexafluorodisiloxane.

== Sources ==
- Lide, David R., ed. (2009). CRC Handbook of Chemistry and Physics (90th ed.). Boca Raton, Florida: CRC Press. ISBN 978-1-4200-9084-0.
- G. Brauer [Брауэр Г.], ed. (1985). Руководство по неорганическому синтезу [Guide to Inorganic Synthesis] (in Russian). Vol. 3. Moscow: Mir. p. 392.
- K. A. Adrianov [Адрианов К. А.] (1955). Кремнийорганические соединения [Organosilicon Compounds] (in Russian). Moscow: State scientific and technical publishing house of chemical literature. p. 521.
- Booth, Harold Simmons; Osten, Reuben Alexander (July 1945). "The Fluorination of Chlorodisiloxane / Silicon Oxyfluoride". Journal of the American Chemical Society. 67 (7): 1092–1096. Bibcode:1945JAChS..67.1092B. doi:10.1021/ja01223a021.
