= Gananite =

Rare bismuth fluoride mineral

General
- Category: Halide mineral
- Formula: BiF_{3}
- IMA symbol: Gan
- Strunz classification: 3.AC.20
- Crystal system: Cubic
- Crystal class: Hextetrahedral (4̅3m); H-M symbol: (4̅ 3m)
- Space group: P4̅3m

Identification
- Color: Brown to black, greenish black
- Crystal habit: Aggregates
- Fracture: Uneven
- Tenacity: Brittle
- Mohs scale hardness: 3.5
- Luster: Resinous to semimetallic
- Streak: Dark grey
- Diaphaneity: Subtranslucent to Opaque
- Specific gravity: 8.928 calculated
- Optical properties: Isotropic
- Birefringence: N/A
- Pleochroism: Non-Pleochroic

Gananite (simplified Chinese: 赣南矿; traditional Chinese: 贛南礦; pinyin: gànnánkuàng) is a rare bismuth fluoride mineral form of bismuth trifluoride with a general formula of BiF_{3}. Gananite is an isotropic mineral that belongs to the space group P43m. This means that gananite does not show any colors in cross polarized light, because when polarized light passes through it, it does not split into two perpendicular rays. In other words, because gananite is an isometric mineral, it does not exhibit double refraction. Moreover, this tells us that this mineral is not birefringent. Its color in plane-polarized light is blackish-brown, and it does not show pleochroism.

== Discovery and occurrence ==
It was first described in 1984 for an occurrence in the Laikeng Mining District, Gan County, Ganzhou Prefecture, Jiangxi Province, China. The name is given for its occurrence in the Southern Ganzhou (Gannan) region of China. In the Gannan occurrence, the only reported location, it occurs in quartz veins in association with wolframite, native bismuth, bismuthinite, pyrite and chalcopyrite.

== Uses ==
Despite the obscurity of gananite and its very limited use, it is sometimes used in China as a bismuth ore.
