= Antimony trichloride =

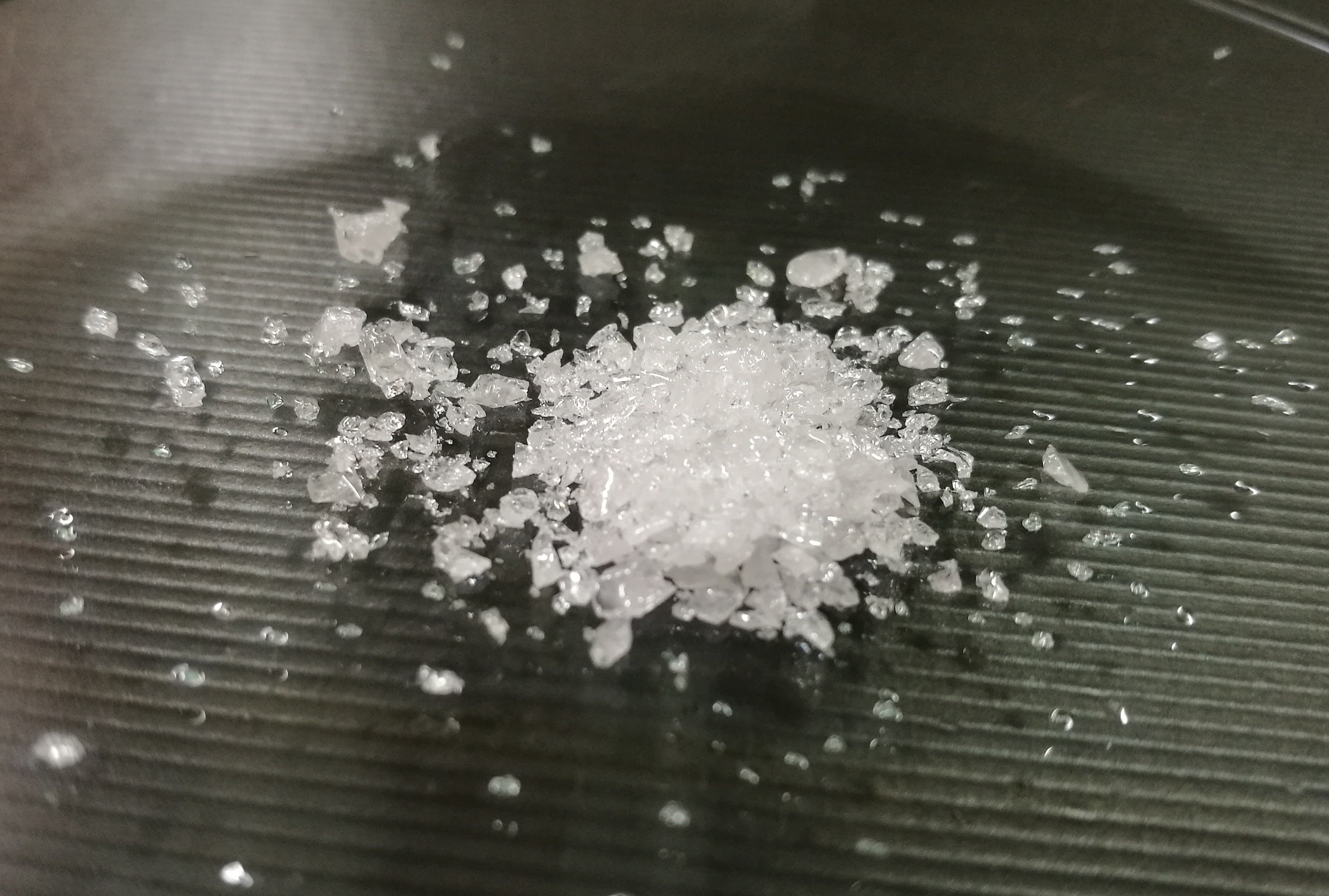

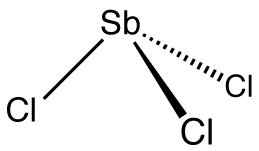
Stereo structural formula of antimony trichloride
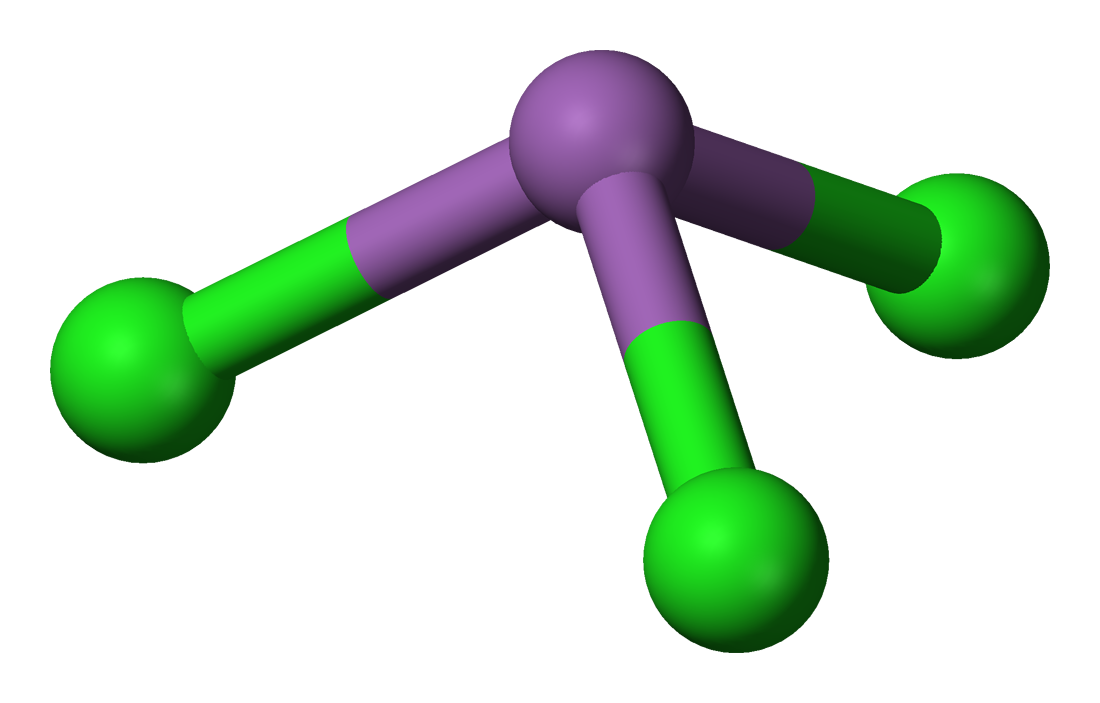
Ball and stick model of antimony trichloride

Names
- Preferred IUPAC name Antimony trichloride
- Systematic IUPAC name Trichlorostibane
- Other names Antimony(III) chloride, Butter of antimony, Antimonous chloride, Stibous chloride, Trichlorostibine

Identifiers
CAS Number	10025-91-9
3D model (JSmol)	Interactive image
ChEBI	CHEBI:74856
ChemSpider	23199
ECHA InfoCard	100.030.031
EC Number	233-047-2
KEGG	C15235
MeSH	Antimony+trichloride
PubChem CID	24814
RTECS number	CC4900000
UNII	J281401KK3
UN number	1733
CompTox Dashboard (EPA)	DTXSID4044161
- InChI: InChI=1S/3ClH.Sb/h3*1H;/q;;;+3/p-3 Key: FAPDDOBMIUGHIN-UHFFFAOYSA-K; InChI=1S/3ClH.Sb/h3*1H;/q;;;+3/p-3 Key: FAPDDOBMIUGHIN-UHFFFAOYSA-K; InChI=1/3ClH.Sb/h3*1H;/q;;;+3/p-3 Key: FAPDDOBMIUGHIN-DFZHHIFOAK
- SMILES: Cl[Sb](Cl)Cl

Properties
Chemical formula	Cl_{3}Sb
Molar mass	228.11 g·mol^{−1}
Appearance	Colorless solid, very hygroscopic
Odor	Sharp, pungent
Density	3.14 g/cm^{3} (25 °C); 2.51 g/cm^{3} (150 °C)
Melting point	73.4 °C (164.1 °F; 346.5 K)
Boiling point	223.5 °C (434.3 °F; 496.6 K)
Solubility in water	601.1 g/100 ml (0 °C); 985.1 g/100 mL (25 °C); 1.357 kg/100 mL (40 °C)
Solubility	Soluble in acetone, ethanol, CH_{2}Cl_{2}, phenyls, ether, dioxane, CS_{2}, CCl_{4}, CHCl_{3}, cyclohexane, selenium(IV) oxychloride Insoluble in pyridine, quinoline, organic bases
Solubility in acetic acid	143.9 g/100 g (0 °C); 205.8 g/100 g (10 °C); 440.5 g/100 g (25 °C); 693.7 g/100 g (45 °C)
Solubility in acetone	537.6 g/100 g (18 °C)
Solubility in benzoyl chloride	139.2 g/100 g (15 °C); 169.5 g/100 g (25 °C); 2.76 kg/100 g (70 °C)
Solubility in hydrochloric acid	20 °C: 8.954 g/ g (4.63% w/w); 8.576 g/ g (14.4% w/w); 7.898 g/ g (36.7% w/w)
Solubility in p-Cymene	69.5 g/100 g (−3.5 °C); 85.5 g/100 g (10 °C); 150 g/100 g (30 °C); 2.17 kg/100 g (70 °C)
Vapor pressure	13.33 Pa (18.1 °C); 0.15 kPa (50 °C); 2.6 kPa (100 °C)
Magnetic susceptibility (χ)	−86.7·10^{−6} cm^{3}/mol
Refractive index (n_{D})	1.46

Structure
Crystal structure	Orthorhombic
Dipole moment	3.93 D (20 °C)

Thermochemistry
Heat capacity (C)	183.3 J/mol·K
Std molar entropy (S^{⦵}_{298})	110.5 J/mol·K
Std enthalpy of formation (Δ_{f}H^{⦵}_{298})	−381.2 kJ/mol
Gibbs free energy (Δ_{f}G^{⦵})	−322.5 kJ/mol

Hazards
- GHS labelling
Pictograms	(GHS05: Corrosive) (GHS09: Environmental hazard)
Signal word	Danger
Hazard statements	H314, H411
Precautionary statements	P273, P280, P305+P351+P338, P310
NFPA 704 (fire diamond)	2 0 1
Flash point	Non-flammable
- Lethal dose or concentration (LD, LC)
LD_{50} (median dose)	525 mg/kg (oral, rat)
- NIOSH (US health exposure limits)
PEL (Permissible)	TWA 0.5 mg/m^{3} (as Sb)
REL (Recommended)	TWA 0.5 mg/m^{3} (as Sb)
Safety data sheet (SDS)	ICSC 1224

Related compounds
Other anions	Antimony trifluoride Antimony tribromide Antimony triiodide
Other cations	Nitrogen trichloride Phosphorus trichloride Arsenic trichloride Bismuth chloride
Related compounds	Antimony pentachloride
- Except where otherwise noted, data are given for materials in their standard state (at 25 °C [77 °F], 100 kPa). verify (what is ?) Infobox references

Antimony trichloride is the chemical compound with the formula SbCl_{3}. It is a soft colorless solid with a pungent odor and was known to alchemists as butter of antimony.

== Preparation ==
Antimony trichloride is prepared by reaction of chlorine with antimony, antimony tribromide, antimony trioxide, or antimony trisulfide. It also may be made by treating antimony trioxide with concentrated hydrochloric acid.

== Reactions ==
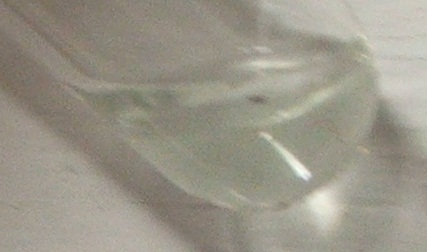
Antimony trichloride solution in hydrochloric acid

SbCl_{3} is readily hydrolysed and samples of SbCl_{3} must be protected from moisture. With a limited amount of water it forms antimony oxychloride releasing hydrogen chloride:

SbCl_{3} + H_{2}O → SbOCl + 2 HCl

With more water it forms Sb_{4}O_{5}Cl_{2} which on heating to 460 °C under argon converts to Sb_{8}O_{11}Cl_{2}.

4 SbCl_{3} + 5 H_{2}O → Sb_{4}O_{5}Cl_{2} + 10 HCl
11 Sb_{4}O_{5}Cl_{2} → 5 Sb_{8}O_{11}Cl_{2} + 4 SbCl_{3}

SbCl_{3} readily forms complexes with halides, but the stoichiometries are not a good guide to the composition; for example, the (C_{5}H_{5}NH)SbCl_{4} contains a chain anion with distorted Sb^{III} octahedra. Similarly the salt (C_{4}H_{9}NH_{3})_{2}SbCl_{5} contains a polymeric anion of composition [SbCl_{5}^{2−}]n with distorted octahedral Sb^{III}.

With nitrogen donor ligands, L, complexes with a stereochemically active lone-pair are formed, for example Ψ-trigonal bipyramidal LSbCl_{3} and Ψ-octahedral L_{2}SbCl_{3}.

While SbCl_{3} is only a weak Lewis base, some complexes, such as the carbonyl complexes Fe(CO)_{3}(SbCl_{3})_{2} and Ni(CO)_{3}SbCl_{3}, are known.

== Structure ==
In the gas phase SbCl_{3} is pyramidal with a Cl-Sb-Cl angle of 97.2° and a bond length of 233 pm. In solid SbCl_{3} each Sb has three Cl atoms at 234 pm showing the persistence of the molecular SbCl_{3} unit, however there are a further five neighboring Cl atoms, two at 346 pm, one at 361 pm, and two at 374 pm. These eight atoms can be considered as forming a bicapped trigonal prism. These distances can be contrasted with BiCl_{3} which has three near neighbors at 250 pm, with two at 324 pm, and three at a mean of 336 pm. The point to note here is that the all eight close neighbours of Bi are closer than the eight closest neighbours of Sb, demonstrating the tendency for Bi to adopt higher coordination numbers.

== Uses ==
SbCl_{3} is a reagent for detecting vitamin A and related carotenoids in the Carr-Price test. The antimony trichloride reacts with the carotenoid to form a blue complex that can be measured by colorimetry.

Antimony trichloride has also been used as an adulterant to enhance the louche effect in absinthe. It has been used in the past to dissolve and remove horn buds from calves without having to cut them off.

It is also used as a catalyst for polymerization, hydrocracking, and chlorination reactions; a mordant; and in the production of other antimony salts. Its solution is used as an analytical reagent for chloral, aromatics, and vitamin A. It has a very potential use as a Lewis acid catalyst in synthetic organic transformation.

A solution of antimony trichloride in liquid hydrogen sulfide is a good conductor, though the applications of such are limited by the very low temperature or high pressure required for hydrogen sulfide to be liquid.

== References in popular culture ==
In episode 2 of the third season of the popular British program All Creatures Great and Small (adapted from chapter six of the book All Things Wise and Wonderful), several calves died at Kate Billings farm following an episode of nonspecific gastroenteritis, the cause of which was later determined to be ingestion of antimony trichloride present in a topical "butter of antimony" solution painted on to cauterize and remove their horn buds.
