= Phosphorus tribromide =

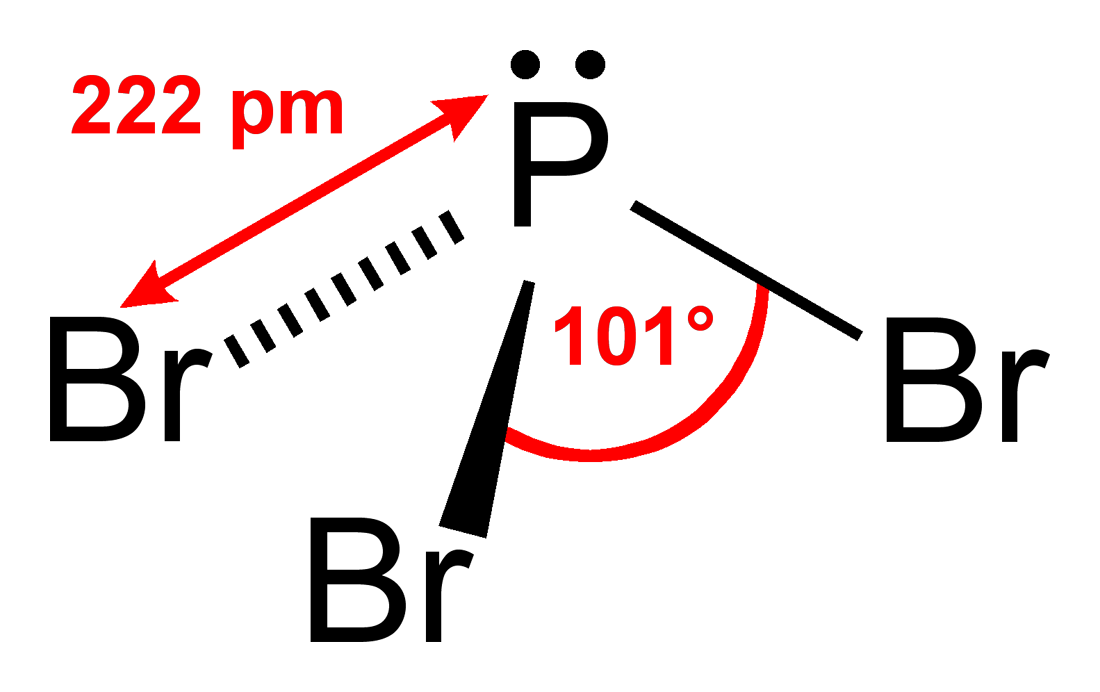
- Phosphorus tribromide

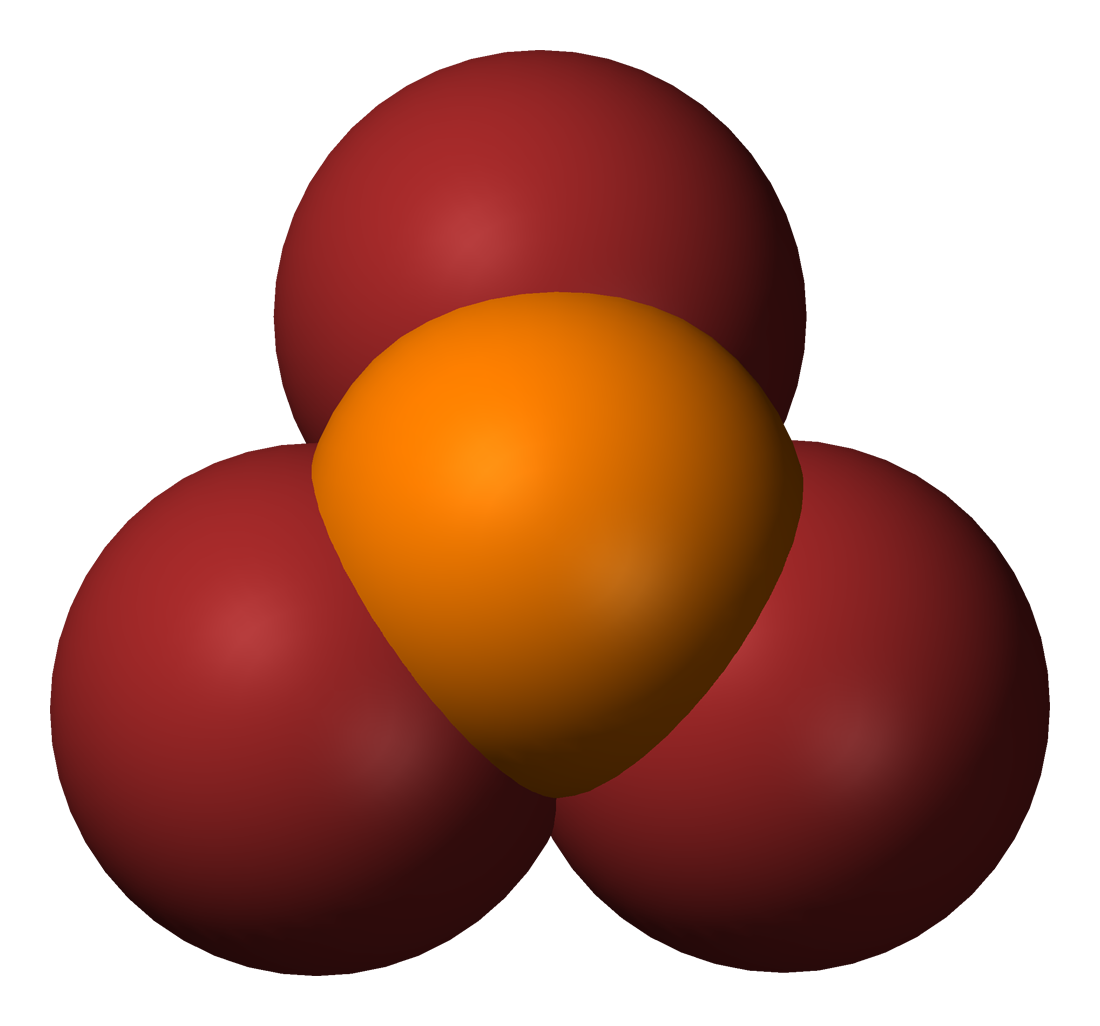
- Phosphorus tribromide

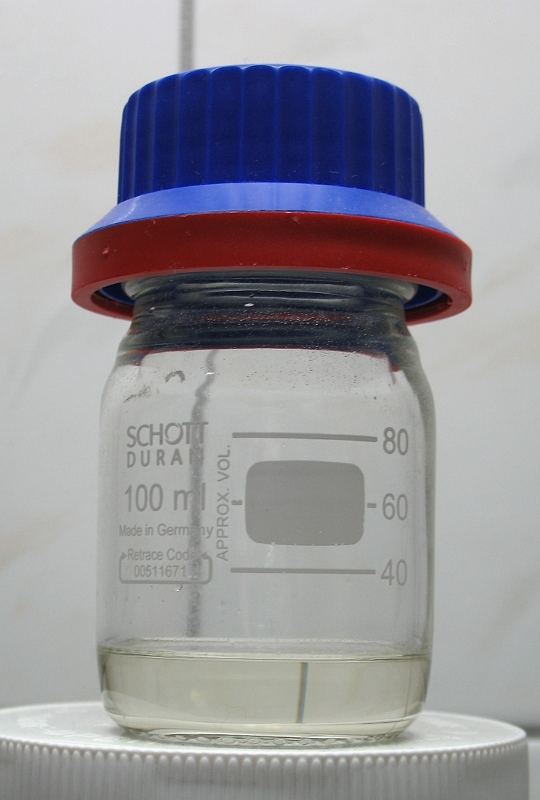
- Phosphorus tribromide

Names
- IUPAC name Phosphorus tribromide
- Other names phosphorus(III) bromide, phosphorous bromide, tribromophosphine

Identifiers
CAS Number	7789-60-8
3D model (JSmol)	Interactive image
ChemSpider	23016
ECHA InfoCard	100.029.253
EC Number	232-178-2
PubChem CID	24614
RTECS number	TH4460000
UNII	58R3866PUA
CompTox Dashboard (EPA)	DTXSID7064869
- InChI: InChI=1S/Br3P/c1-4(2)3 Key: IPNPIHIZVLFAFP-UHFFFAOYSA-N
- SMILES: BrP(Br)Br

Properties
Chemical formula	PBr_{3}
Molar mass	270.69 g/mol
Appearance	clear, colourless liquid
Density	2.852 g/cm^{3}
Melting point	−41.5 °C (−42.7 °F; 231.7 K)
Boiling point	173.2 °C (343.8 °F; 446.3 K)
Solubility in water	rapid hydrolysis
Refractive index (n_{D})	1.697
Viscosity	0.001302 Pas

Structure
Molecular shape	trigonal pyramidal

Hazards
- GHS labelling
Pictograms	(GHS05: Corrosive) (GHS07: Exclamation mark)
Signal word	Danger
Hazard statements	H314, H335
Precautionary statements	P260, P264, P271, P280, P301+P330+P331, P303+P361+P353, P304+P340, P305+P351+P338, P310, P312, P321, P363, P403+P233, P405, P501
NFPA 704 (fire diamond)	3 0 2 W

Related compounds
Other anions	phosphorus trifluoride phosphorus trichloride phosphorus triiodide
Other cations	nitrogen tribromide arsenic tribromide antimony tribromide
Related compounds	phosphorus pentabromide phosphorus oxybromide

Supplementary data page
- Phosphorus tribromide (data page)
- Except where otherwise noted, data are given for materials in their standard state (at 25 °C [77 °F], 100 kPa). verify (what is ?) Infobox references

Phosphorus tribromide is a colourless liquid with the formula PBr_{3}. The liquid fumes in moist air due to hydrolysis and has a penetrating odour. It is used in the laboratory for the conversion of alcohols to alkyl bromides.

== Preparation ==
PBr_{3} is prepared by treating red phosphorus with bromine. An excess of phosphorus is used in order to prevent formation of PBr_{5}:

P_{4} + 6 Br_{2} → 4 PBr_{3}

Because the reaction is highly exothermic, it is often conducted in the presence of a diluent such as PBr_{3}. Phosphorus tribromide is also generated in situ from red phosphorus and bromine.

== Reactions ==
Phosphorus tribromide, like PCl_{3} and PF_{3}, has both properties of a Lewis base and a Lewis acid. For example, with a Lewis acid such as boron tribromide it forms stable 1 :1 adducts such as Br_{3}B · PBr_{3}. At the same time PBr_{3} can react as an electrophile or Lewis acid in many of its reactions, for example with amines.

An important reaction of PBr_{3} is with alcohols, where it replaces an OH group with a bromine atom to produce an alkyl bromide. All three bromides can be transferred.

PBr_{3} + 3 (CH_{3})_{2}CHCH_{2}OH → 3 (CH_{3})_{2}CHCH_{2}Br + HP(O)(OH)_{2}

Several detailed procedures are available. In some cases, triphenylphosphine/Br_{2} is superior to PBr_{3}.

The mechanism for a primary alcohol involves formation of a phosphorous ester (to form a good leaving group), followed by an S_{N}2 substitution.

Because of the S_{N}2 substitution step, the reaction generally works well for primary and secondary alcohols, but fails for tertiary alcohols. If the reacting carbon centre is chiral, the reaction usually occurs with inversion of configuration at the carbon alpha to the alcohol, as is usual with an S_{N}2 reaction.

In a similar reaction, PBr_{3} also converts carboxylic acids to acyl bromides:

PBr_{3} + 3 RCO_{2}H → 3 RCOBr + HP(O)(OH)_{2}

== Applications ==
The main use for phosphorus tribromide is for conversion of primary or secondary alcohols to alkyl bromides, as described above. PBr_{3} usually gives higher yields than hydrobromic acid, and it avoids problems of carbocation rearrangement- for example even neopentyl bromide can be made from the alcohol in 60% yield.

Another use for PBr_{3} is as a catalyst for the α-bromination of carboxylic acids. Although acyl bromides are rarely made in comparison with acyl chlorides, they are used as intermediates in Hell-Volhard-Zelinsky halogenation. Initially PBr_{3} reacts with the carboxylic acid to form the acyl bromide, which is more reactive towards bromination. The overall process can be represented as

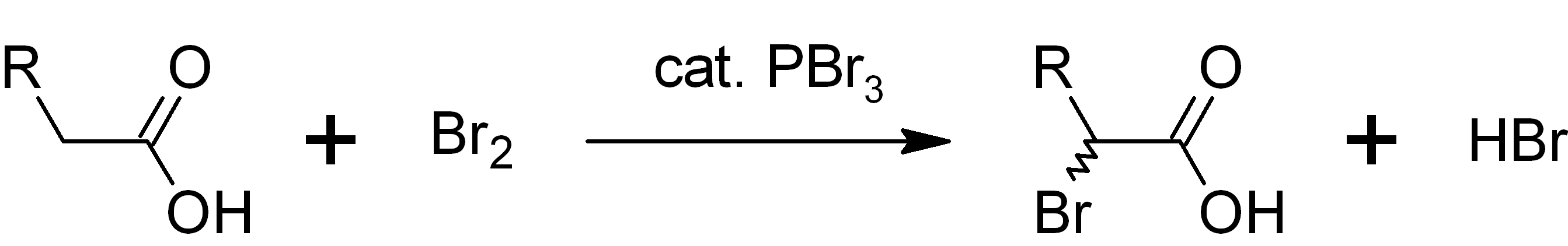

On a commercial scale, phosphorus tribromide is used in the manufacture of pharmaceuticals such as alprazolam, methohexital and fenoprofen. It is also a potent fire suppression agent marketed under the name PhostrEx.

Phosphorus tribromide is used for doping in microelectronics.

== Precautions ==
PBr_{3} evolves corrosive HBr, which is toxic, and reacts violently with water and alcohols.

PBr_{3} + 3 H_{2}O → H_{3}PO_{3} + 3 HBr

In reactions that produce phosphorous acid as a by-product, when working up by distillation be aware that this can decompose above about 160 °C to give phosphine which can cause explosions in contact with air.
