= Bismuth fluoride =

Bismuth fluoride may refer to:

- Bismuth trifluoride, BiF_{3}
- Bismuth pentafluoride, BiF_{5}
