= Arsenic trichloride =

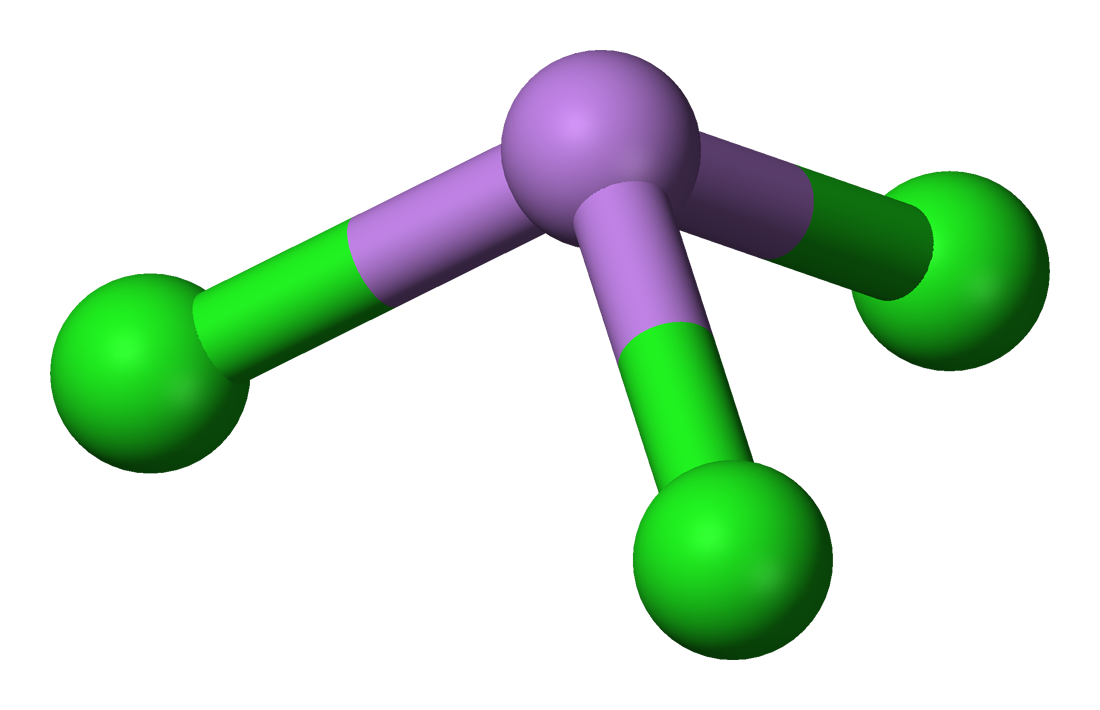
- Ball-and-stick model of arsenic trichloride

Names
- Other names Arsenic(III) chloride, Arsenous trichloride, Arsine trichloride, Butter of arsenic, de Valagin's solution, Trichloroarsine

Identifiers
CAS Number	7784-34-1
3D model (JSmol)	Interactive image
ChemSpider	22974
ECHA InfoCard	100.029.144
EC Number	232-059-5
PubChem CID	24570
RTECS number	CG1750000
UNII	5XW39M1300
UN number	1560
CompTox Dashboard (EPA)	DTXSID3042556
- InChI: InChI=1S/AsCl3/c2-1(3)4 Key: OEYOHULQRFXULB-UHFFFAOYSA-N; InChI=1/AsCl3/c2-1(3)4 Key: OEYOHULQRFXULB-UHFFFAOYAG
- SMILES: Cl[As](Cl)Cl

Properties
Chemical formula	AsCl_{3}
Molar mass	181.28 g/mol
Appearance	colourless oily liquid
Density	2.163 g/cm^{3}, liquid
Melting point	−16.2 °C (2.8 °F; 256.9 K)
Boiling point	130.2 °C (266.4 °F; 403.3 K)
Solubility in water	Hydrolyzes
Solubility	soluble in alcohol, ether, HCl, HBr, chloroform, CCl_{4}
Magnetic susceptibility (χ)	−79.9·10^{−6} cm^{3}/mol
Refractive index (n_{D})	1.6006
Viscosity	9.77 × 10^{−6} Pa s

Hazards
- Occupational safety and health (OHS/OSH)
Main hazards	Very toxic, carcinogen, corrosive, decomposes on contact with water releasing HCl
- GHS labelling
Pictograms	(GHS05: Corrosive) (GHS06: Toxic) (GHS08: Health hazard) (GHS09: Environmental hazard)
Signal word	Danger
Hazard statements	H301, H310, H314, H331, H350, H410
Precautionary statements	P201, P202, P260, P262, P264, P270, P271, P273, P280, P281, P301+P310, P301+P330+P331, P302+P350, P303+P361+P353, P304+P340, P305+P351+P338, P308+P313, P310, P311, P321, P322, P330, P361, P363, P391, P403+P233, P405, P501
NFPA 704 (fire diamond)	4 0 1
- Lethal dose or concentration (LD, LC)
LD_{50} (median dose)	48 mg/kg
LC_{Lo} (lowest published)	100 mg/m^{3} (cat, 1 hr); 200 mg/m^{3} (cat, 20 min); 338 ppm (rat, 10 min)
- NIOSH (US health exposure limits)
PEL (Permissible)	[1910.1018] TWA 0.010 mg/m^{3}
REL (Recommended)	Ca C 0.002 mg/m^{3} [15-minute]
IDLH (Immediate danger)	Ca [5 mg/m^{3} (as As)]

Related compounds
Other anions	Arsenic trioxide, Arsenic trifluoride
Other cations	Antimony trichloride
- Except where otherwise noted, data are given for materials in their standard state (at 25 °C [77 °F], 100 kPa). verify (what is ?) Infobox references

Arsenic trichloride is an inorganic compound with the formula AsCl_{3}, also known as arsenous chloride or butter of arsenic. This poisonous oil is colourless, although impure samples may appear yellow. It is an intermediate in the manufacture of organoarsenic compounds.

== Structure ==
AsCl_{3} is a pyramidal molecule with C_{3v} symmetry. The As-Cl bond is 2.161 Å and the angle Cl-As-Cl is 98° 25'±30. AsCl_{3} has four normal modes of vibration: ν1(A_{1}) 416, ν2(A_{1}) 192, ν3 393, and ν4(E) 152 cm^{−1}.

== Synthesis ==
This compound is prepared by treatment of arsenic(III) oxide with hydrogen chloride followed by distillation:

As_{2}O_{3} + 6 HCl → 2 AsCl_{3} + 3 H_{2}O

It can also be prepared by chlorination of arsenic metal at 80–85 °C:

2 As + 3 Cl_{2} → 2 AsCl_{3}

Arsenic trichloride can be prepared by the reaction of arsenic oxide and sulfur monochloride. This method requires simple apparatus and proceeds efficiently:

2 As_{2}O_{3} + 6 S_{2}Cl_{2} → 4 AsCl_{3} + 3 SO_{2} + 9 S

A convenient laboratory method is refluxing arsenic(III) oxide with thionyl chloride:

2 As_{2}O_{3} + 3 SOCl_{2} → 2 AsCl_{3} + 3 SO_{2}

Arsenic trichloride can also be prepared by the reaction of hydrochloric acid and arsenic(III) sulfide.

As_{2}S_{3} + 6 HCl → 2 AsCl_{3} + 3 H_{2}S

== Reactions ==
Hydrolysis gives arsenous acid and hydrochloric acid:

AsCl_{3} + 3 H_{2}O → As(OH)_{3} + 3 HCl

Although AsCl_{3} is less moisture sensitive than PCl_{3}, it still fumes in moist air.

AsCl_{3} undergoes redistribution upon treatment with As_{2}O_{3} to give the inorganic polymer AsOCl. With chloride sources, AsCl_{3} also forms salts containing the anion [AsCl_{4}]^{−}. Reaction with potassium bromide and potassium iodide give arsenic tribromide and arsenic triiodide, respectively.

AsCl_{3} is useful in organoarsenic chemistry, for example triphenylarsine is derived from AsCl_{3}:

AsCl_{3} + 6 Na + C_{6}H_{5}Cl → As(C_{6}H_{5})_{3} + 6 NaCl

The chemical weapons called Lewisites are prepared by the addition of arsenic trichloride to acetylene:

AsCl_{3} + C_{2}H_{2} → ClCH=CHAsCl_{2}

== Safety ==
Inorganic arsenic compounds are highly toxic, and AsCl_{3} especially so because of its volatility and solubility (in water).

A mixture of 50% hydrocyanic acid, 30% arsenic trichloride, 15% stannic chloride and 5% chloroform called Vincennite was used as chemical weapon by French forces in the World War I.

It is classified as an extremely hazardous substance in the United States as defined in Section 302 of the U.S. Emergency Planning and Community Right-to-Know Act (42 U.S.C. 11002), and is subject to strict reporting requirements by facilities which produce, store, or use it in significant quantities.
