= Bismuth trifluoride =

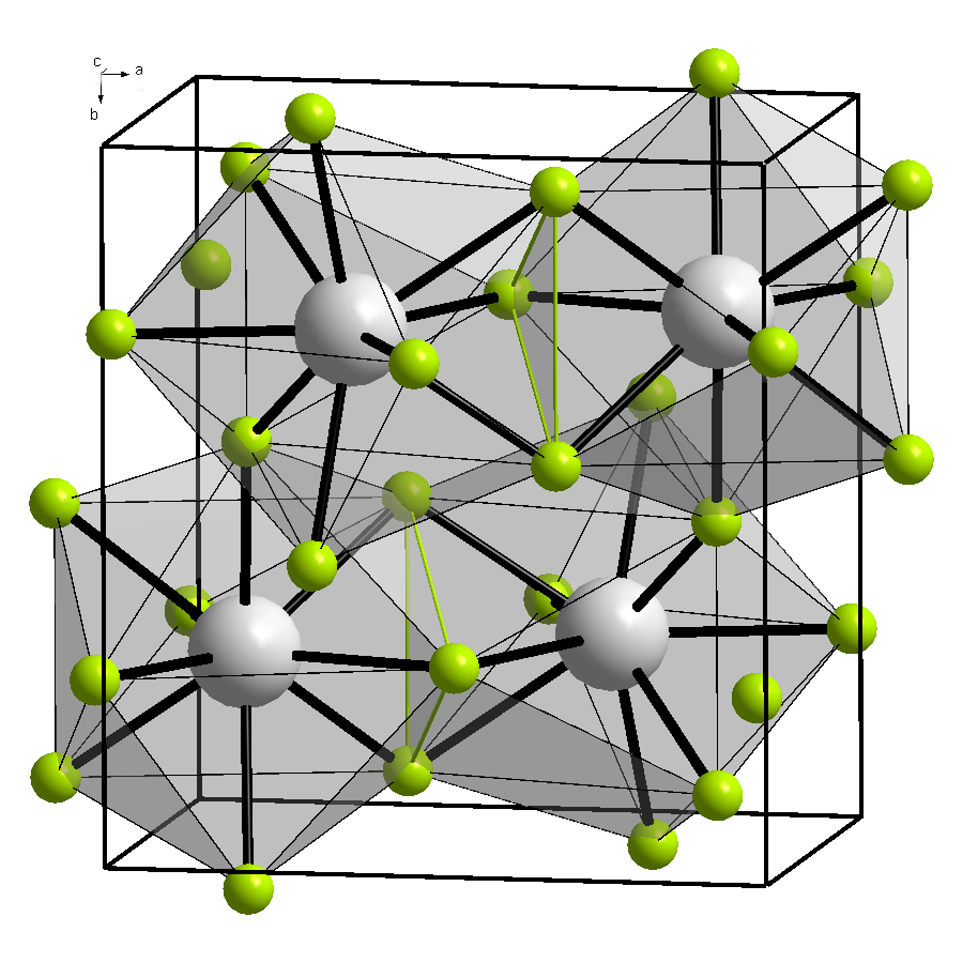
- Bismuth trifluoride

Names
- IUPAC name Bismuth(III) fluoride
- Other names Bismuth trifluoride

Identifiers
CAS Number	7787-61-3
3D model (JSmol)	Interactive image
ChemSpider	21172751
ECHA InfoCard	100.029.204
EC Number	232-124-8
PubChem CID	82233
UNII	6I46O71A7B
CompTox Dashboard (EPA)	DTXSID8064852
- InChI: InChI=1/Bi.3FH.3H/h;3*1H;;;/q+3;;;;;;/p-3/rBiH3.3FH/h1H3;3*1H/q+3;;;/p-3 Key: GRQDKISMHISLGB-IZWAAGQTAY
- SMILES: [F-].[F-].[F-].[BiH3+3]

Properties
Chemical formula	BiF_{3}
Molar mass	265.97550 g/mol
Appearance	grey-white powder
Density	5.32 g cm^{−3}
Melting point	649˚C
Solubility in water	Insoluble in water
Magnetic susceptibility (χ)	−61.0·10^{−6} cm^{3}/mol

Structure
Crystal structure	Orthorhombic, oP16, SpaceGroup = Pnma, No. 62 (β phase)

Hazards
- Occupational safety and health (OHS/OSH)
Main hazards	Irritant
- GHS labelling
Pictograms	(GHS05: Corrosive)
Signal word	Danger
Hazard statements	H314
Precautionary statements	P260, P264, P280, P301+P330+P331, P303+P361+P353, P304+P340, P305+P351+P338, P310, P321, P363, P405, P501
NFPA 704 (fire diamond)	1 0 0

Related compounds
Other anions	Bismuth chloride
Other cations	Nitrogen trifluoride; Phosphorus trifluoride; Arsenic trifluoride; Antimony trifluoride
- Except where otherwise noted, data are given for materials in their standard state (at 25 °C [77 °F], 100 kPa). Infobox references

Bismuth(III) fluoride or bismuth trifluoride is a chemical compound of bismuth and fluorine. The chemical formula is BiF_{3}. It is a grey-white powder melting at 649 °C.

It occurs in nature as the rare mineral gananite.

== Synthesis ==
Bismuth fluoride can be prepared by reacting bismuth(III) oxide with hydrofluoric acid:

Bi_{2}O_{3} + 6 HF → 2 BiF_{3} + 3 H_{2}O

== Structure ==
α-BiF_{3} has a cubic crystalline structure (Pearson symbol cF16, space group Fm-3m, No. 225). BiF_{3} is the prototype for the D0_{3} structure, which is adopted by several intermetallics, including Mg_{3}Pr, Cu_{3}Sb, Fe_{3}Si, and AlFe_{3}, as well as by the hydride LaH_{3.0}. The unit cell is face-centered cubic with Bi at the face centers and vertices, and F at the octahedral site (mid-edges, center), and tetrahedral sites (centers of the 8 sub cubes) - thus the primitive cell contains 4 Bi and 12 F. Alternatively, with the unit cell shifted (1/4,1/4,1/4) the description can be of a fcc cell with face, edge, corner, and centers filled with F, and half (4 of) the octant centers with F, the other half with Bi (each octant type tetrahedrally arranged). The edge length of the BiF_{3} cell is 0.5853 nm.

β-BiF_{3} has the YF_{3} structure where the bismuth atom has distorted 9 coordination, tricapped trigonal prism. This structure is generally considered to be ionic, and contrasts with fluorides of the lighter members of group 15, phosphorus trifluoride, PF_{3}, arsenic trifluoride, AsF_{3} and antimony trifluoride, SbF_{3}, where MX_{3} molecular units are present in the solid.

== Reactions ==
BiF_{3} is unaffected by water and is almost insoluble. It does not form complexes readily but the following, BiF_{3}.3HF and BiF_{4}^{−} in NH_{4}BiF_{4}, are known. The addition compound H_{3}BiF_{6} is hydrolysed by water forming BiOF.

== Uses ==
BiF_{3} has received research attention as a possible electrode material for lithium batteries and as a luminescence host material for lanthanum-doped phosphors.
