= Antimony trifluoride =

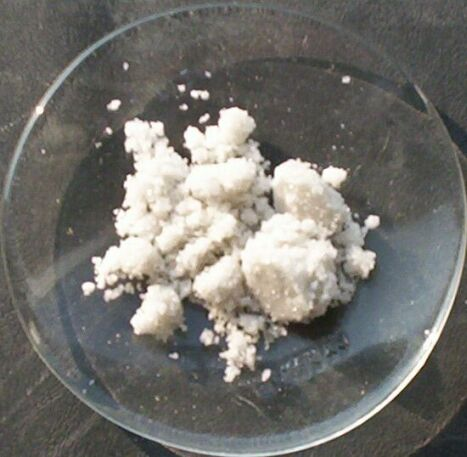

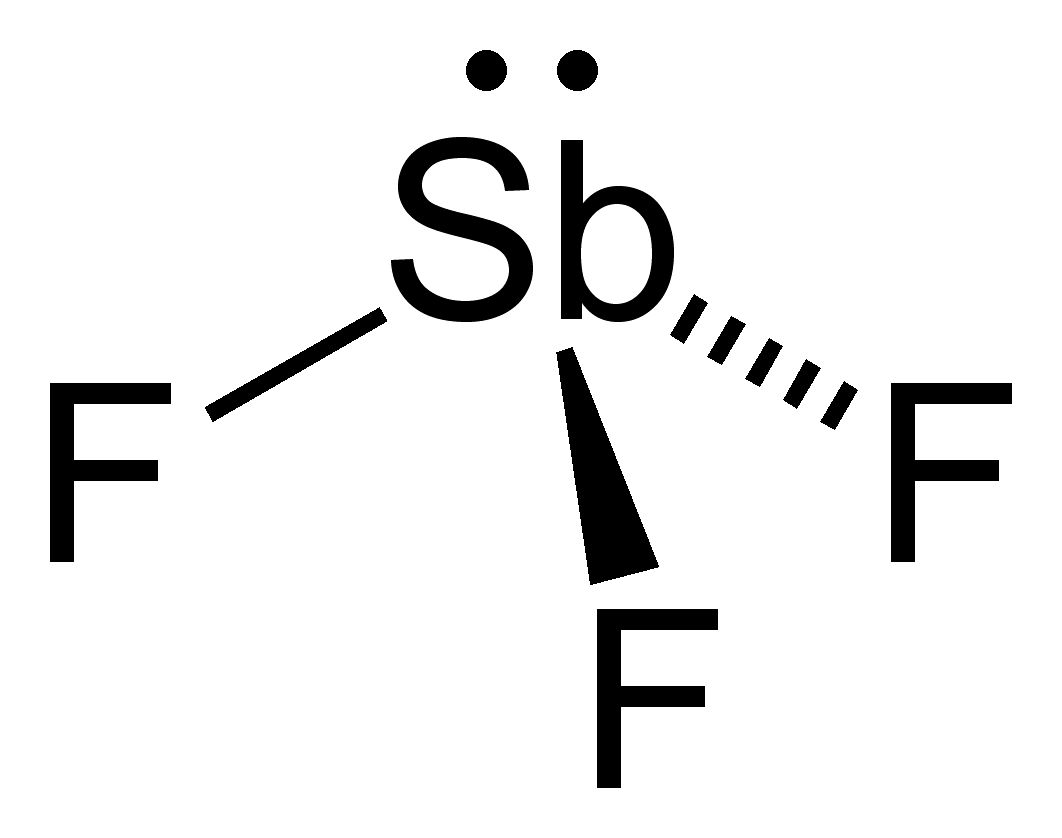
Structural formula
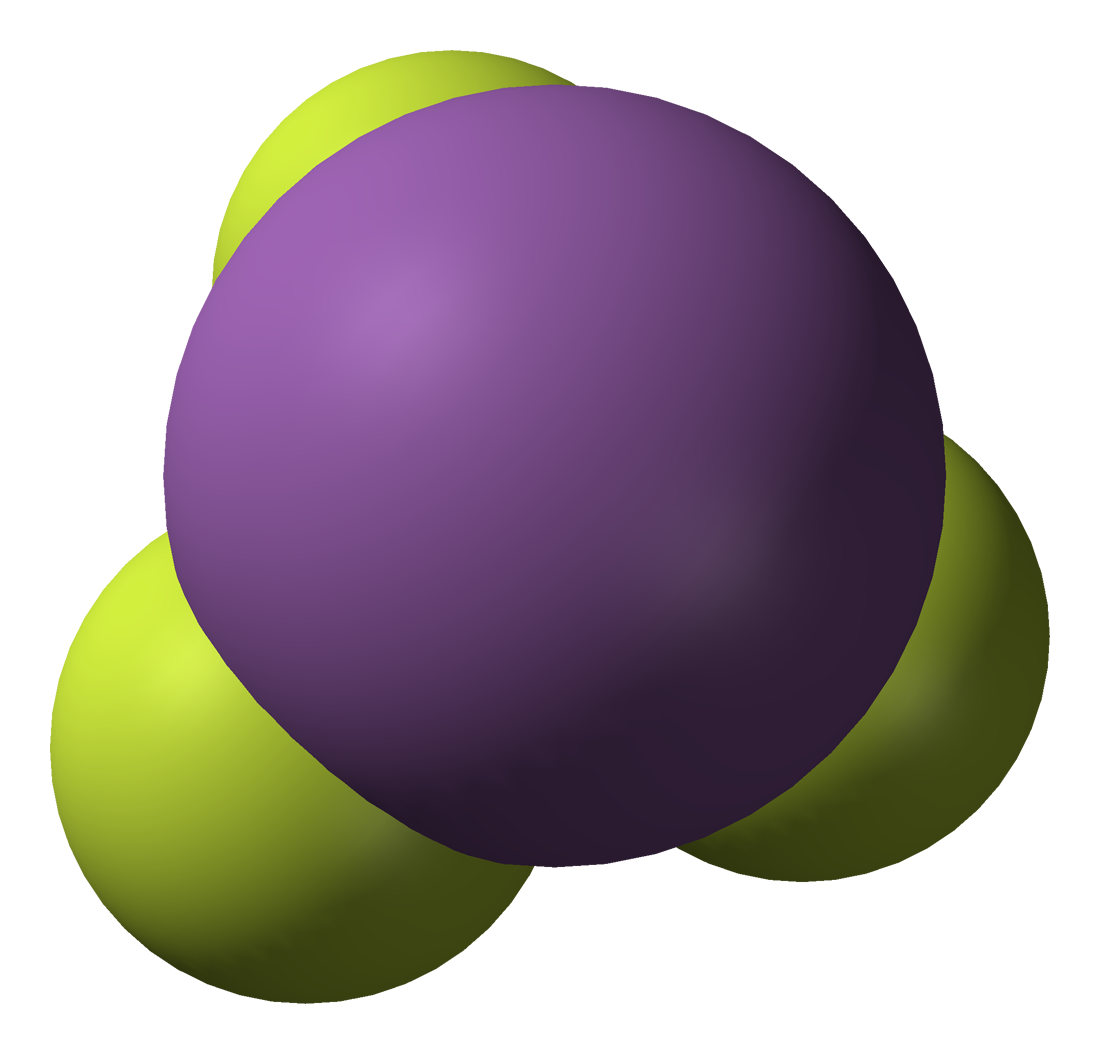
space-filling model
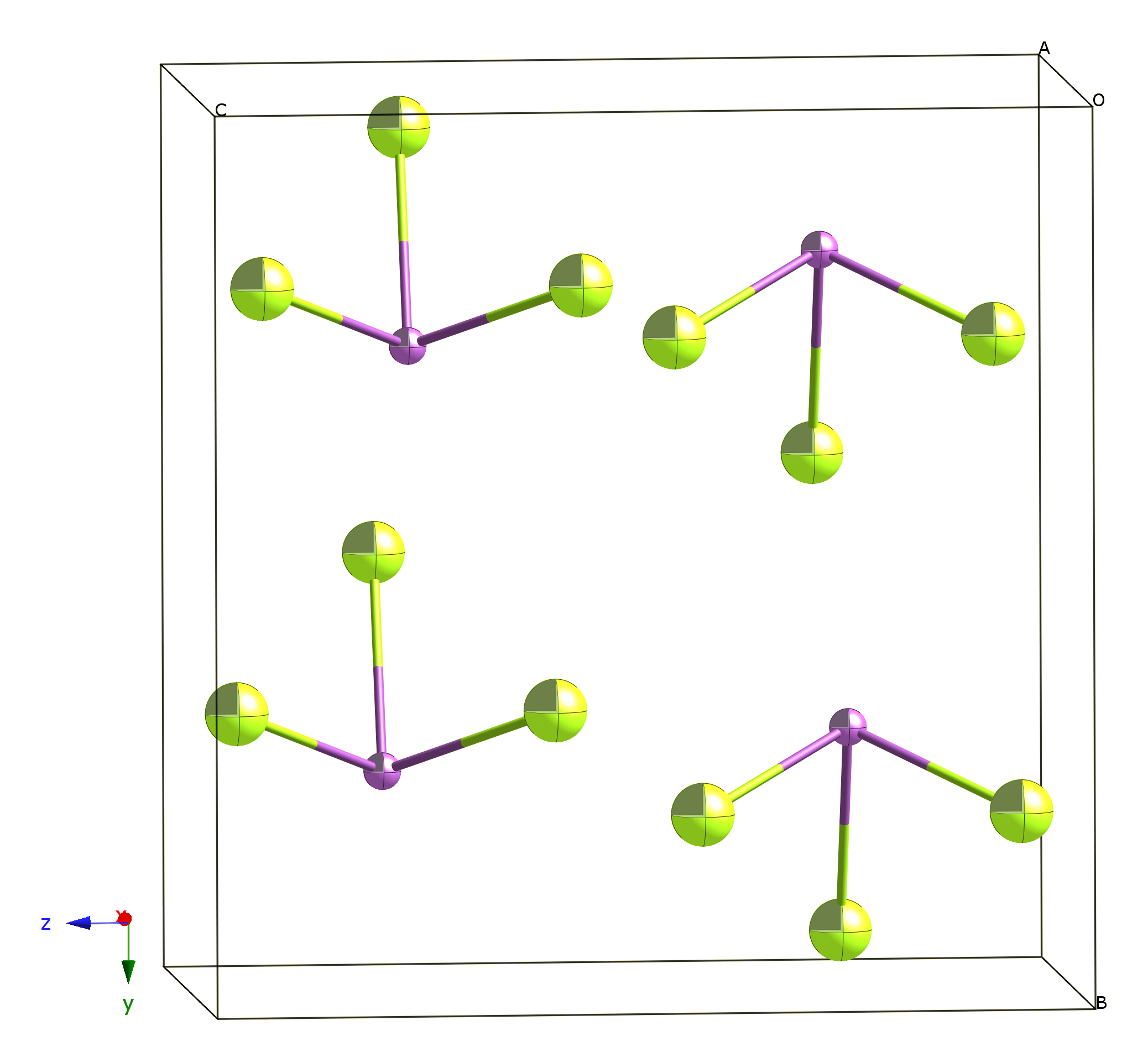
Unit cell
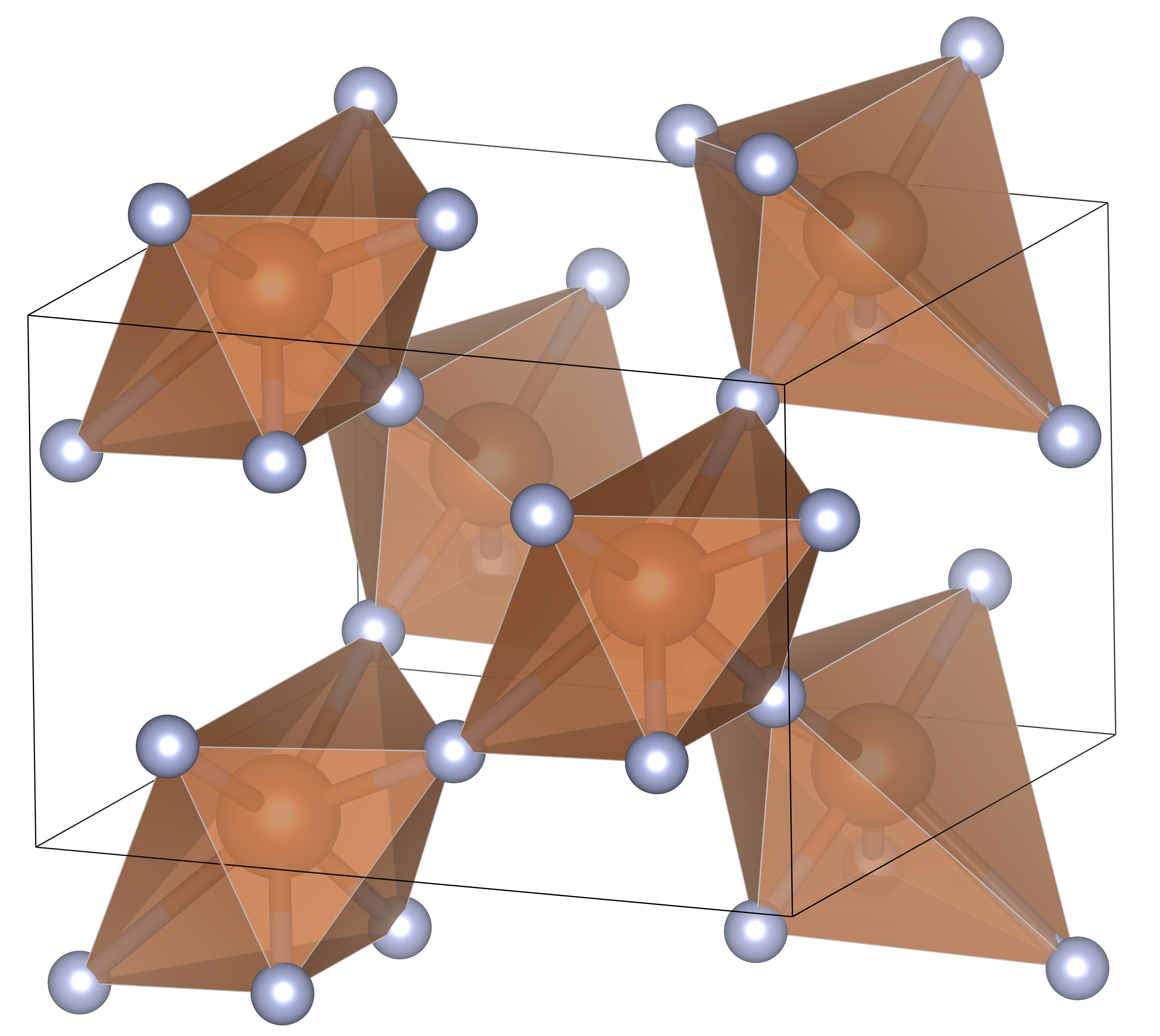
Unit cell of antimony trifluoride. The distorted-octahedral coordination of the fluorine relative to the antimony is visualized.

Names
- Preferred IUPAC name Antimony(III) fluoride
- Systematic IUPAC name Trifluorostibane
- Other names Trifluoroantimony

Identifiers
CAS Number	7783-56-4
3D model (JSmol)	Interactive image
ChemSpider	22960
ECHA InfoCard	100.029.099
EC Number	232-009-2
PubChem CID	24554
RTECS number	CC5150000
UNII	VWM00O92AM
UN number	UN 2923
CompTox Dashboard (EPA)	DTXSID1064827
- InChI: InChI=1S/3FH.Sb/h3*1H;/q;;;+3/p-3 Key: GUNJVIDCYZYFGV-UHFFFAOYSA-K; InChI=1S/3FH.Sb/h3*1H;/q;;;+3/p-3 Key: GUNJVIDCYZYFGV-UHFFFAOYSA-K; InChI=1/3FH.Sb/h3*1H;/q;;;+3/p-3 Key: GUNJVIDCYZYFGV-DFZHHIFOAW
- SMILES: F[Sb](F)F

Properties
Chemical formula	SbF_{3}
Molar mass	178.76 g/mol
Appearance	light gray to white crystals
Odor	pungent
Density	4.379 g/cm^{3}
Melting point	292 °C (558 °F; 565 K)
Boiling point	376 °C (709 °F; 649 K)
Solubility in water	385 g/100 mL (0 °C); 443 g/100 mL (20 °C); 562 g/100 mL (30 °C)
Solubility	soluble in methanol, acetone insoluble in ammonia
Magnetic susceptibility (χ)	−46.0·10^{−6} cm^{3}/mol

Structure
Crystal structure	Orthorhombic, oS16
Space group	Ama2, No. 40

Hazards
NFPA 704 (fire diamond)	3 0 0
- Lethal dose or concentration (LD, LC)
LD_{50} (median dose)	100 mg/kg
- NIOSH (US health exposure limits)
PEL (Permissible)	TWA 0.5 mg/m^{3} (as Sb)
REL (Recommended)	TWA 0.5 mg/m^{3} (as Sb)

Related compounds
Other anions	Antimony trichloride Antimony tribromide Antimony triiodide
Other cations	Nitrogen trifluoride Phosphorus trifluoride Arsenic trifluoride Bismuth fluoride
Related compounds	Antimony pentafluoride
- Except where otherwise noted, data are given for materials in their standard state (at 25 °C [77 °F], 100 kPa). verify (what is ?) Infobox references

Antimony trifluoride is the inorganic compound with the formula SbF_{3}. Sometimes called Swarts' reagent, it is one of two principal fluorides of antimony, the other being SbF_{5}. It appears as a white solid. As well as some industrial applications, it is used as a reagent in inorganic and organofluorine chemistry.

== Preparation and structure ==
In solid SbF_{3}, the Sb centres have octahedral molecular geometry and are linked by bridging fluoride ligands. Three Sb–F bonds are short (192 pm) and three are long (261 pm). Because it is a polymer, SbF_{3} is far less volatile than related compounds AsF_{3} and SbCl_{3}.

SbF_{3} is prepared by treating antimony trioxide with hydrogen fluoride:

Sb_{2}O_{3} + 6 HF → 2 SbF_{3} + 3 H_{2}O

The compound is a mild Lewis acid, hydrolyzing slowly in water. With fluorine, it is oxidized to give antimony pentafluoride.

SbF_{3} + F_{2} → SbF_{5}

== Applications ==
It is used as a fluorination reagent in organic chemistry. This application was reported by the Belgian chemist Frédéric Jean Edmond Swarts in 1892, who demonstrated its usefulness for converting chloride compounds to fluorides. The method involved treatment with antimony trifluoride with chlorine or with antimony pentachloride to give the active species antimony trifluorodichloride (SbCl_{2}F_{3}). This compound can also be produced in bulk. The Swarts reaction is generally applied to the synthesis of organofluorine compounds, but experiments have been performed using silanes. It was once used for the industrial production of freon. Other fluorine-containing Lewis acids serve as fluorinating agents in conjunction with hydrogen fluoride.

SbF_{3} is used in dyeing and in pottery, to make ceramic enamels and glazes.

== Safety ==
The lethal minimum dose (guinea pig, oral) is 100 mg/kg.
