= Phosphorus triiodide =

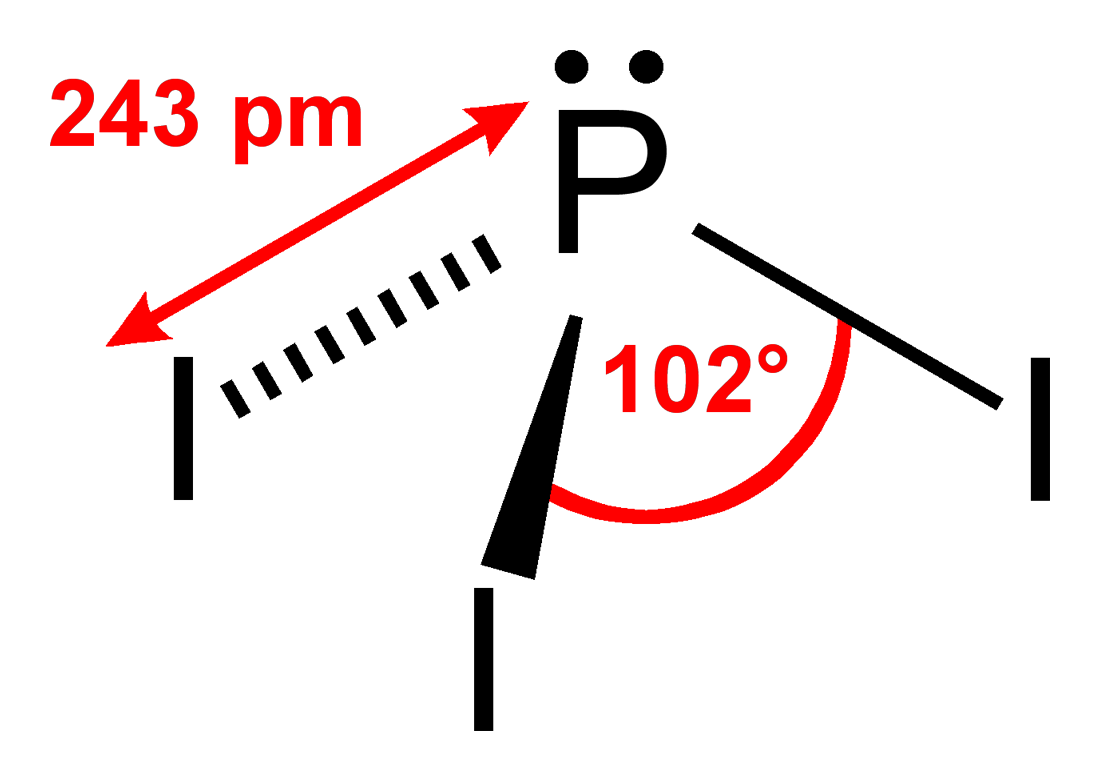
- Phosphorus triiodide

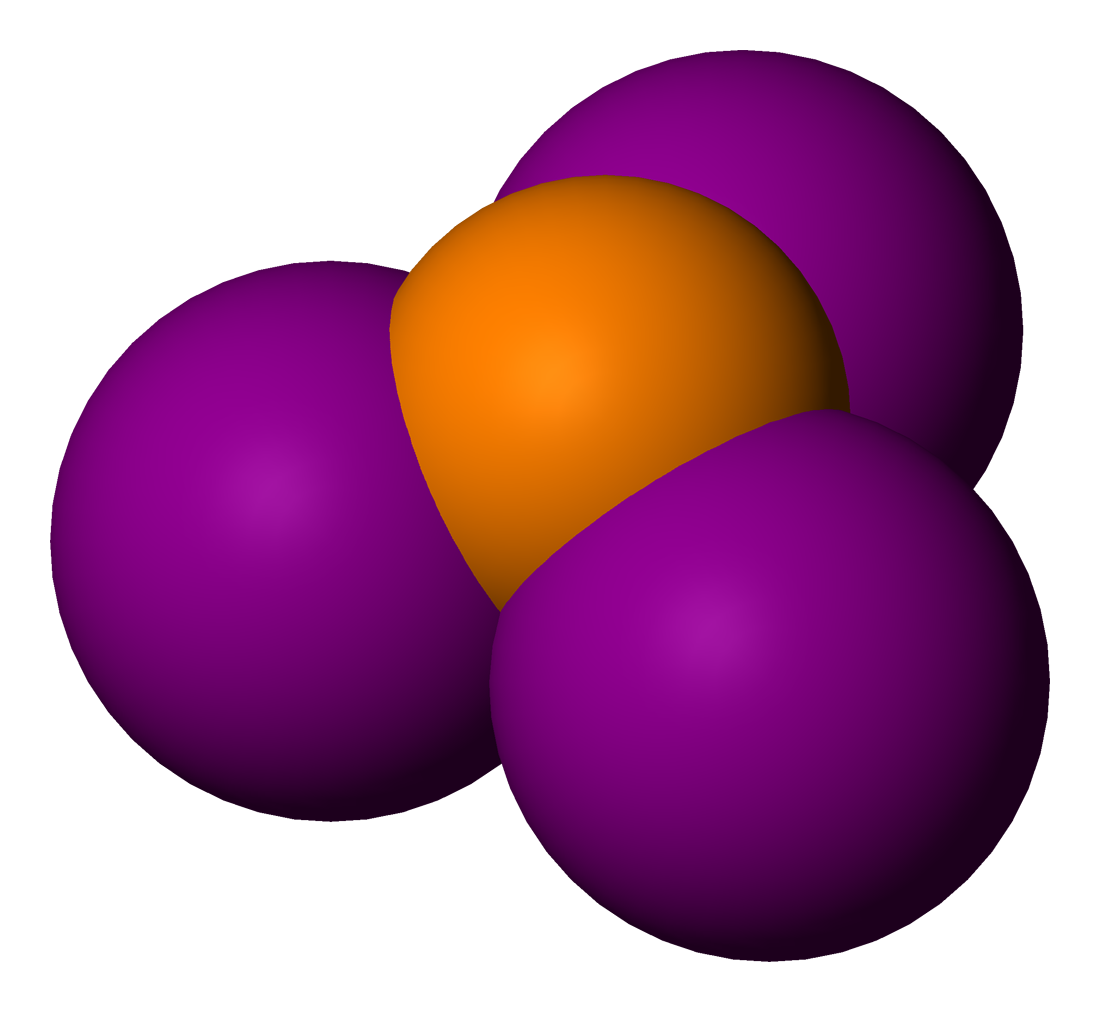
- Space-filling model of the phosphorus triiodide molecule

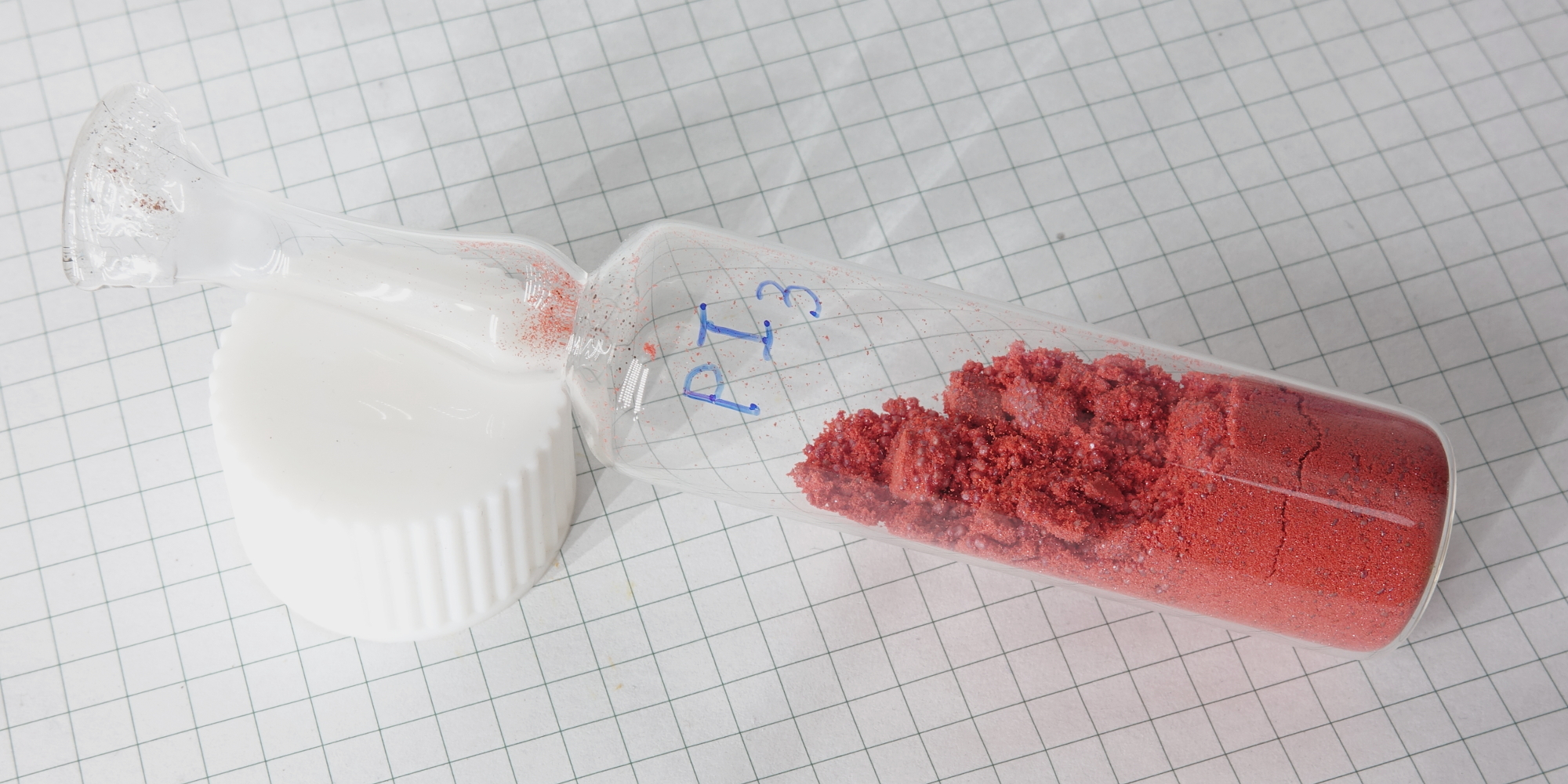
- Sample of phosphorus triiodide

Names
- IUPAC names Phosphorus triiodide Phosphorus(III) iodide
- Other names Triiodophosphine

Identifiers
| CAS Number | 13455-01-1 |
| 3D model (JSmol) | Interactive image |
| ChemSpider | 75323 |
| ECHA InfoCard | 100.033.302 |
| EC Number | 236-647-2 |
| PubChem CID | 83485 |
| UNII | 82QUK78Y7Y |
| CompTox Dashboard (EPA) | DTXSID1065475 |
- InChI: InChI=1S/I3P/c1-4(2)3 Key: PZHNNJXWQYFUTD-UHFFFAOYSA-N; InChI=1/I3P/c1-4(2)3 Key: PZHNNJXWQYFUTD-UHFFFAOYAR
- SMILES: IP(I)I

Properties
| Chemical formula | PI_{3} |
| Molar mass | 411.68717 g/mol |
| Appearance | dark red solid |
| Density | 4.18 g/cm^{3} |
| Melting point | 61.2 °C (142.2 °F; 334.3 K) |
| Boiling point | 200 °C (392 °F; 473 K) (decomposes) |
| Solubility in water | Decomposes |

Structure
| Molecular shape | Trigonal pyramidal |

Hazards
- GHS labelling
| Pictograms | (GHS05: Corrosive) (GHS07: Exclamation mark) |
| Signal word | Danger |
| Hazard statements | H314, H335 |
| Precautionary statements | P260, P280, P301+P330+P331, P303+P361+P353, P305+P351+P338 |
| NFPA 704 (fire diamond) | 3 0 2 W |
| Flash point | non-flammable |
- Except where otherwise noted, data are given for materials in their standard state (at 25 °C [77 °F], 100 kPa). verify (what is ?) Infobox references

Phosphorus triiodide (PI_{3}) is an inorganic compound with the formula PI_{3}. A red solid, it is too unstable to be stored for long periods of time; it is, nevertheless, commercially available. It is widely used in organic chemistry for converting alcohols to alkyl iodides and also serves as a powerful reducing agent.

== Properties ==
Although PI_{3} is a pyramidal molecule, it has only a small molecular dipole because each P-I bond has almost no bond dipole moment. The P-I bond is also weak; PI_{3} is much less stable than PBr_{3} and PCl_{3}, with a standard enthalpy of formation for PI_{3} of only −46 kJ/ mol (solid). The phosphorus atom has an NMR chemical shift of 178 ppm (downfield of H_{3}PO_{4}).

== Reactions ==
Phosphorus triiodide reacts vigorously with water, producing phosphorous acid (H_{3}PO_{3}) and hydroiodic acid (HI), along with smaller amounts of phosphine and various P-P-containing compounds. Alcohols likewise form alkyl iodides, this providing the main use for PI_{3}.

PI_{3} is also a powerful reducing agent and deoxygenating agent. It reduces sulfoxides to sulfides, even at −78 °C. Meanwhile, heating a 1-iodobutane solution of PI_{3} with red phosphorus causes reduction to P_{2}I_{4}.

== Preparation ==
The usual method or preparation is by the union of the elements, often by addition of iodine to a solution of white phosphorus in carbon disulfide:

P_{4} + 6 I_{2} → 4 PI_{3}

Alternatively, PCl_{3} may be converted to PI_{3} by the action of hydrogen iodide or certain metal iodides.

== Uses ==
Phosphorus triiodide is commonly used in the laboratory for the conversion of primary or secondary alcohols to alkyl iodides. The alcohol is frequently used as the solvent, on top of being the reactant. Often the PI_{3} is made in situ by the reaction of red phosphorus with iodine in the presence of the alcohol; for example, the conversion of methanol to give iodomethane:

PI_{3} + 3 CH_{3}OH → 3 CH_{3}I + " H_{3}PO_{3}"

These alkyl iodides are useful compounds for nucleophilic substitution reactions, and for the preparation of Grignard reagents.

== See also ==
- Nitrogen triiodide
- Diphosphorus tetraiodide
- Phosphorus trifluoride
- Phosphorus trichloride
- Phosphorus tribromide
- Phosphorus pentaiodide
