= Bismuth chloride =

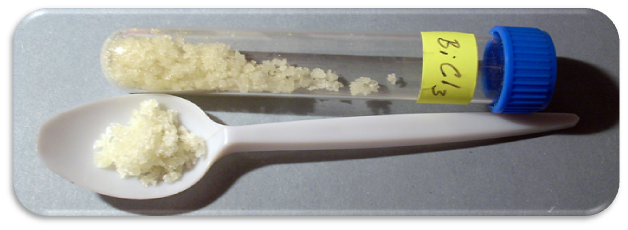
- Bismuth chloride

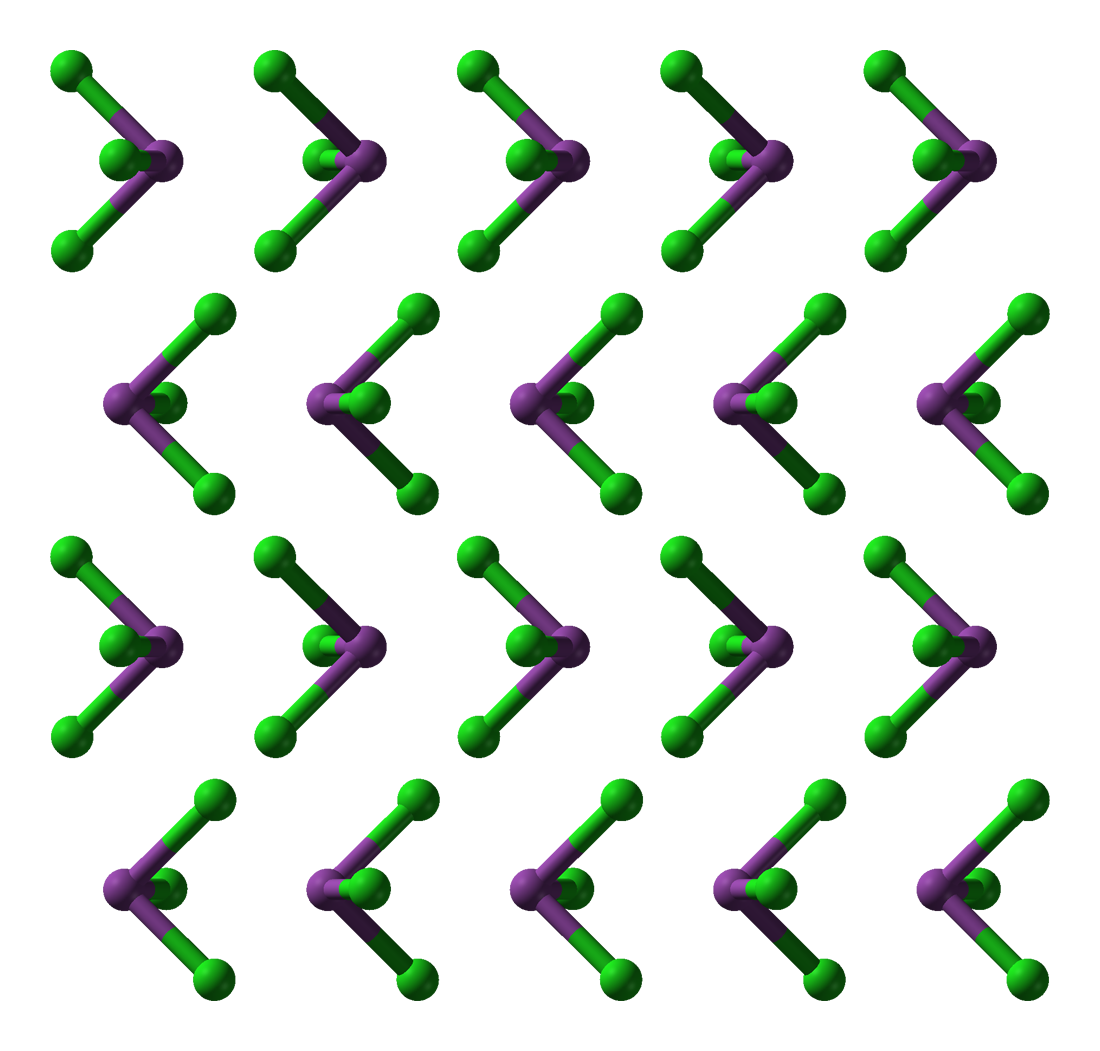

Names
- IUPAC name Bismuth chloride
- Other names Bismuth trichloride, Trichlorobismuth, Trichlorobismuthine, Bismuth(III) chloride

Identifiers
CAS Number	7787-60-2
3D model (JSmol)	Interactive image
ChemSpider	22993
ECHA InfoCard	100.029.203
PubChem CID	24591
RTECS number	EB2690000
UNII	4X6566U3SD
CompTox Dashboard (EPA)	DTXSID3064851
- InChI: InChI=1S/Bi.3ClH/h;3*1H/q+3;;;/p-3 Key: JHXKRIRFYBPWGE-UHFFFAOYSA-K; InChI=1/Bi.3ClH/h;3*1H/q+3;;;/p-3 Key: JHXKRIRFYBPWGE-DFZHHIFOAJ
- SMILES: Cl[Bi](Cl)Cl

Properties
Chemical formula	BiCl_{3}
Molar mass	315.34 g/mol
Appearance	hygroscopic white to yellow crystals
Density	4.75 g/cm^{3}
Melting point	227 °C (441 °F; 500 K)
Boiling point	447 °C (837 °F; 720 K)
Solubility in water	Soluble, hydrolyses
Solubility	soluble in methanol, diethyl ether, acetone
Magnetic susceptibility (χ)	−26.5·10^{−6} cm^{3}/mol

Structure
Crystal structure	cubic

Thermochemistry
Heat capacity (C)	0.333 J/(g K)
Std molar entropy (S^{⦵}_{298})	82.9 J/(K mol)
Std enthalpy of formation (Δ_{f}H^{⦵}_{298})	−1.202 kJ/g

Hazards
NFPA 704 (fire diamond)	2 0 0
- Lethal dose or concentration (LD, LC)
LD_{50} (median dose)	3324 mg/kg, oral (rat)
Safety data sheet (SDS)	JT Baker

Related compounds
Other anions	bismuth fluoride, bismuth subsalicylate, bismuth trioxide
Other cations	iron(III) chloride, manganese(II) chloride, cobalt(II) chloride
- Except where otherwise noted, data are given for materials in their standard state (at 25 °C [77 °F], 100 kPa). verify (what is ?) Infobox references

Bismuth chloride (or butter of bismuth) is an inorganic compound with the chemical formula BiCl_{3}. It is a covalent compound and is the common source of the Bi^{3+} ion. In the gas phase and in the crystal, the species adopts a pyramidal structure, in accord with VSEPR theory.

== Preparation ==
Bismuth chloride can be synthesized directly by passing chlorine over bismuth:

2 Bi + 3 Cl_{2} → 2 BiCl_{3}

or by dissolving bismuth metal in aqua regia, evaporating the mixture to give BiCl_{3}·2H_{2}O, which can be distilled to form the anhydrous trichloride.

Alternatively, it may be prepared by adding hydrochloric acid to bismuth oxide and evaporating the solution.

Bi_{2}O_{3} + 6 HCl → 2 BiCl_{3} + 3 H_{2}O

Also, the compound can be prepared by dissolving bismuth in concentrated nitric acid and then adding solid sodium chloride into this solution.

Bi + 6 HNO_{3} → Bi(NO_{3})_{3} + 3 H_{2}O + 3 NO_{2}
Bi(NO_{3})_{3} + 3 NaCl → BiCl_{3} + 3 NaNO_{3}

== Structure ==
In the gas phase BiCl_{3} is pyramidal with a Cl–Bi–Cl angle of 97.5° and a bond length of 242 pm. In the solid state, each Bi atom has three near neighbors at 250 pm, two at 324 pm and three at a mean of 336 pm, the image above highlights the three closest neighbours. This structure is similar to that of AsCl_{3}, AsBr_{3}, SbCl_{3} and SbBr_{3}.

== Chemistry ==
Bismuth chloride is hydrolyzed readily to bismuth oxychloride, BiOCl:

Bi^{3+}(aq) + Cl^{−}(aq) + H_{2}O(l) ⇌ BiOCl (s) + 2 H^{+}(aq)

This reaction can be reversed by adding an acid, such as hydrochloric acid.

Reaction of solid BiCl_{3} with water vapour below 50 °C has been shown to produce the intermediate monohydrate, BiCl_{3}·H_{2}O.

Bismuth chloride is an oxidizing agent, being readily reduced to metallic bismuth by reducing agents.

=== Chloro complexes ===
In contrast to the usual expectation by consistency with periodic trends, BiCl_{3} is a Lewis acid, forming a variety of chloro complexes such as [BiCl_{6}]^{3−} that strongly violates the octet rule. Furthermore, the octahedral structure of this coordination complex does not follow the predictions of VSEPR theory, since the lone pair on bismuth is unexpectedly stereochemically inactive. The dianionic complex [BiCl_{5}]^{2−} does however adopt the expected square pyramidal structure.

Cs_{3}[BiCl_{6}]	Cs_{3}[BiCl_{6}]	[BiCl_{6}]^{3−}

=== Organic catalysis ===
Bismuth chloride is used as a catalyst in organic synthesis. In particular, it catalyzes the Michael reaction and the Mukaiyama aldol reaction. The addition of other metal iodides increases its catalytic activity.
