= Arsenic tribromide =

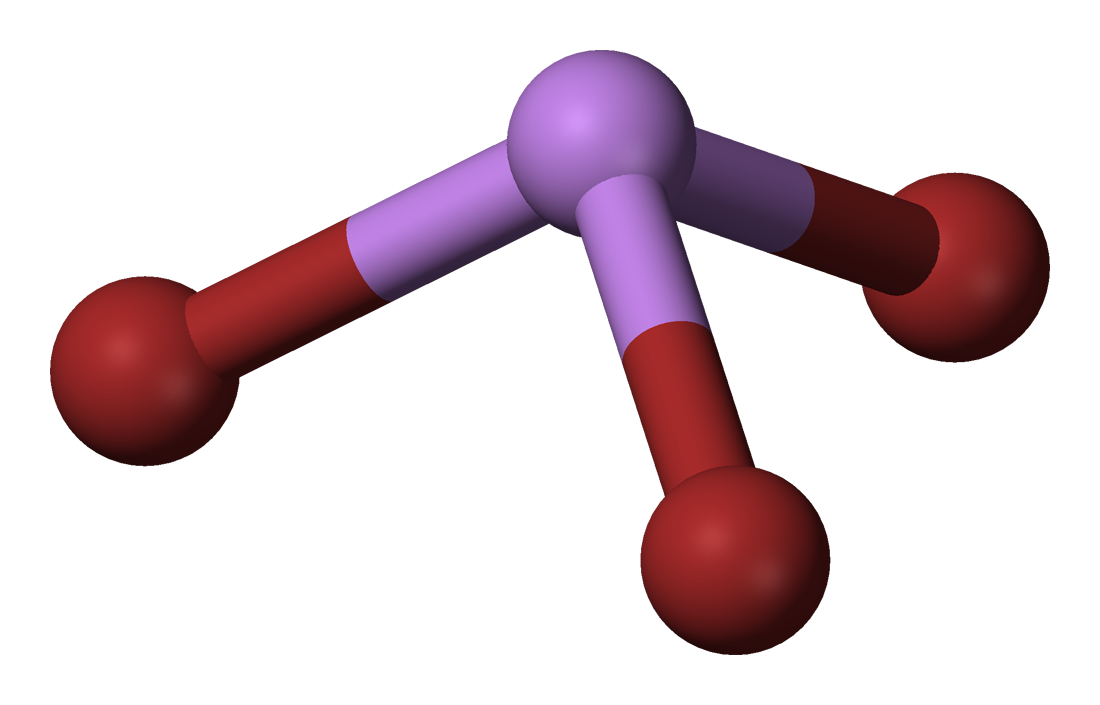
- Ball and stick model of arsenic tribromide

Names
- Preferred IUPAC name Arsenic tribromide
- Systematic IUPAC name Tribromoarsane
- Other names Arsenic(III) bromide Arsenous bromide, Arsenicum Bromatum, Tribromoarsine

Identifiers
CAS Number	7784-33-0
3D model (JSmol)	Interactive image
ChemSpider	22973
ECHA InfoCard	100.029.143
EC Number	232-057-4
PubChem CID	24569
RTECS number	CG1375000
UNII	41CN475O7F
CompTox Dashboard (EPA)	DTXSID4064840
- InChI: InChI=1S/AsBr3/c2-1(3)4 Key: JMBNQWNFNACVCB-UHFFFAOYSA-N; InChI=1S/AsBr3/c2-1(3)4 Key: JMBNQWNFNACVCB-UHFFFAOYSA-N; InChI=1/AsBr3/c2-1(3)4 Key: JMBNQWNFNACVCB-UHFFFAOYAH
- SMILES: Br[As](Br)Br

Properties
Chemical formula	AsBr_{3}
Molar mass	314.634 g/mol
Appearance	white to pale yellow crystalline solid
Density	3.54 g/cm^{3}
Melting point	31.1 °C (88.0 °F; 304.2 K)
Boiling point	221 °C (430 °F; 494 K)
Solubility in water	soluble, partial hydrolysis indicated by fumes
Magnetic susceptibility (χ)	−106.0·10^{−6} cm^{3}/mol
Refractive index (n_{D})	2.3

Hazards
- NIOSH (US health exposure limits)
PEL (Permissible)	[1910.1018] TWA 0.010 mg/m^{3}
REL (Recommended)	Ca C 0.002 mg/m^{3} [15-minute]
IDLH (Immediate danger)	Ca [5 mg/m^{3} (as As)]

Related compounds
Related compounds	Phosphorus tribromide arsenic trichloride
- Except where otherwise noted, data are given for materials in their standard state (at 25 °C [77 °F], 100 kPa). verify (what is ?) Infobox references

Arsenic tribromide is an inorganic compound with the formula AsBr_{3}, it is a bromide of arsenic. This pyramidal molecule is the only known binary arsenic bromide. AsBr_{3} is noteworthy for its very high refractive index of approximately 2.3. It also has a very high diamagnetic susceptibility. The compound exists as colourless deliquescent crystals that fume in moist air.

== Preparation ==
Arsenic tribromide is optimally prepared by treating arsenic(III) oxide with hot concentrated hydrobromic acid.

As_{2}O_{3} + 6 HBr → 2 AsBr_{3} + 3 3 H_{2}O

It can also be prepared by the direct bromination of arsenic powder. Alternatively, arsenic(III) oxide can be treated with a mixture of elemental sulfur and bromine:

2 As_{2}O_{3} + 3 S + 6 Br_{2} → 4 AsBr_{3} + 3 SO_{2}

Arsenic tribromide hydrolyzes readily. It is soluble in hydrocarbons.

== Bromides of arsenic ==
AsBr_{5} is not known, although the corresponding phosphorus compound PBr_{5} is well characterized. AsBr_{3} is the parent for a series of hypervalent anionic bromoarsenates including [As_{2}Br_{8}]^{2−}, [As_{2}Br_{9}]^{3−}, and [As_{3}Br_{12}]^{3−}.

Organoarsenic bromides (CH_{3})_{2}AsBr and (CH_{3})AsBr_{2} are formed efficiently by the copper-catalyzed reaction of methyl bromide with hot arsenic metal. This synthesis is similar to the direct process used for the synthesis of methyl chlorosilanes.

== Safety ==
Arsenic tribromide is highly toxic. It is a carcinogen and a teratogen.
