= Nitrogen tribromide =

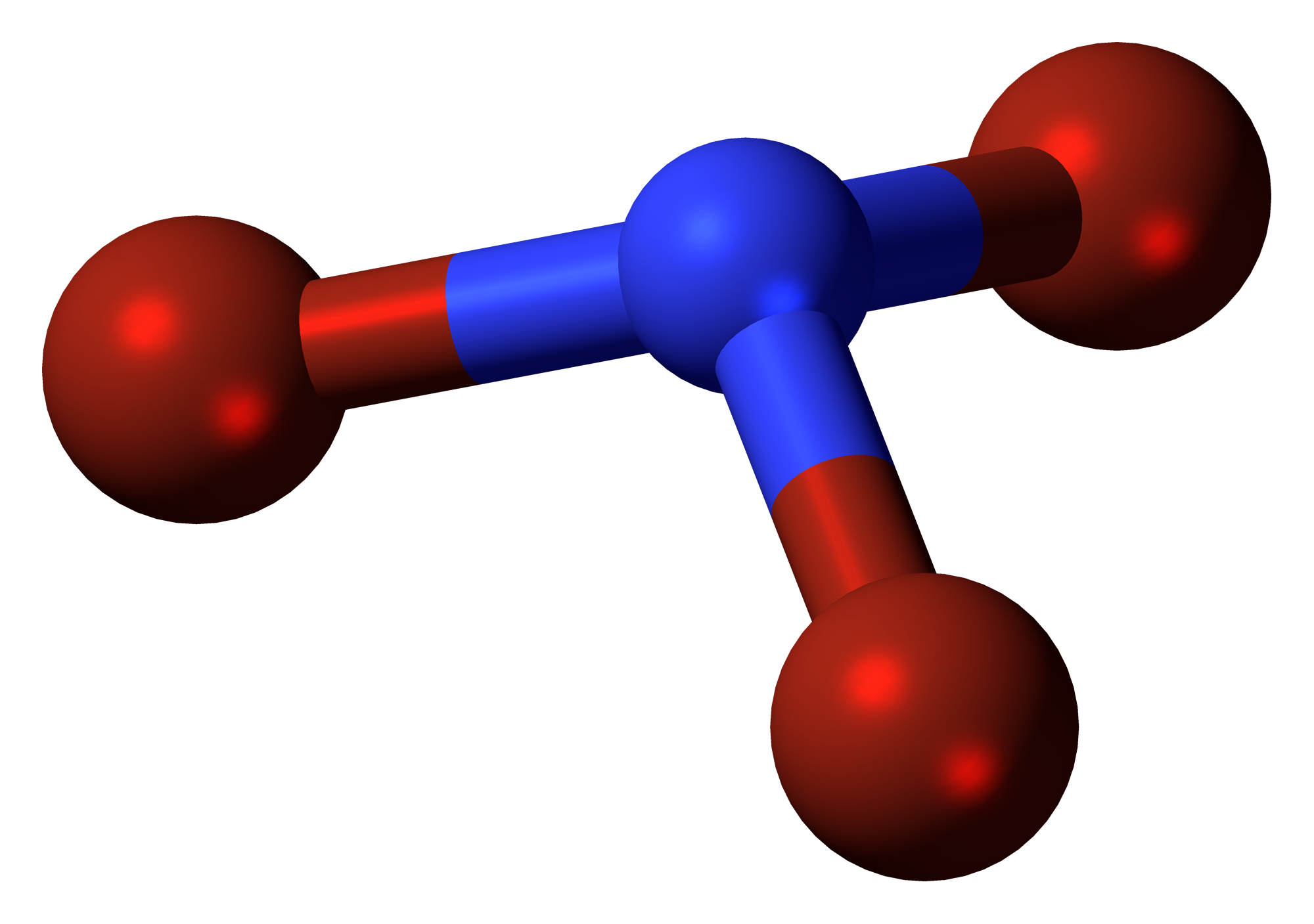

Names
- IUPAC name nitrogen tribromide

Identifiers
CAS Number	15162-90-0
3D model (JSmol)	Interactive image
ChemSpider	20480821
PubChem CID	3082084
CompTox Dashboard (EPA)	DTXSID90164822
- InChI: InChI=1S/3BrH.N/h3*1H;/p-3
- SMILES: N(Br)(Br)Br

Properties
Chemical formula	NBr_{3}
Molar mass	253.7187 g/mol
Appearance	Deep red solid
Melting point	Explodes at −100 °C
- Except where otherwise noted, data are given for materials in their standard state (at 25 °C [77 °F], 100 kPa). Infobox references

Nitrogen tribromide is a chemical compound with the formula NBr_{3}. It is extremely explosive in its pure form, even at −100 °C, and was not isolated until 1975. It is a deep-red and volatile solid.

== Preparation ==
NBr_{3} was first prepared by reaction of bistrimethylsilylbromamine (bis(trimethylsilyl)amine bromide) with bromine monochloride (with trimethylsilyl chloride as byproduct) at −87 °C according to the following equation:

(Me_{3}Si)_{2}NBr + 2 BrCl → NBr_{3} + 2 Me_{3}SiCl

where "Me" is a methyl group.

NBr_{3} can be produced by the reaction of bromine or hypobromite and ammonia in a dilute aqueous buffer solution. It can also be prepared by the reaction of bromine and bromine azide. Ammonia and bromine undergo glow discharge, and after treatment, red NBr_{3}·6NH_{3} can be obtained. Pure nitrogen NBr_{3} was only produced in 1975.

== Reactions ==
Nitrogen tribromide reacts instantly with ammonia in dichloromethane solution at −87 °C to yield NBrH_{2}.

NBr_{3} + 2 NH_{3} → 3 NH_{2}Br

It also reacts with iodine in dichloromethane solution at −87 °C to produce NBr_{2}I, which is a red-brown solid that stable up to -20 °C.

NBr_{3} + I_{2} → NBr_{2}I + IBr
