= Eulytine =

Silicate mineral

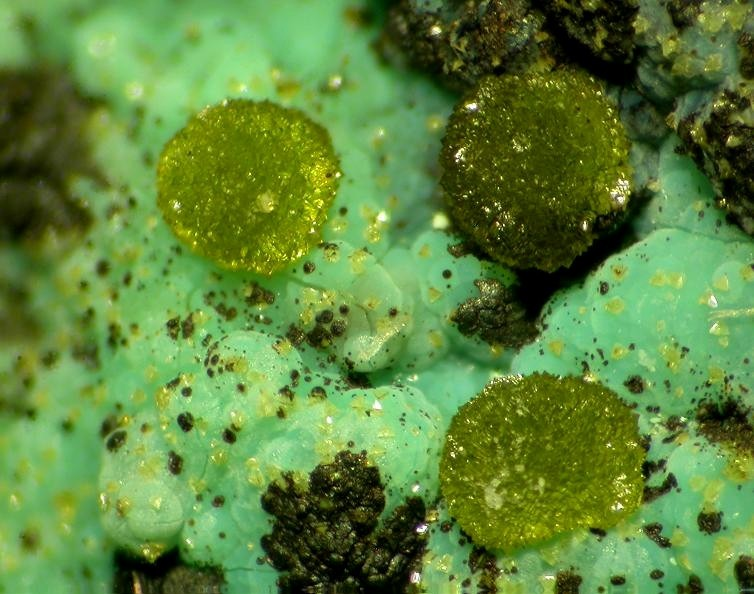
- Eulytine spheroids (agricolites) (Baden-Württemberg, Germany)

General
- Category: Silicate mineral
- Formula: Bi_{4}(SiO_{4})_{3} or Bi_{4}Si_{3}O_{12}
- IMA symbol: Eul
- Strunz classification: 9.AD.40
- Crystal system: Cubic
- Crystal class: Silicate

Identification
- Color: orange or orange-brown to red-brown, less often bright green or colorless
- Crystal habit: generally bright is appearance
- Twinning: penetrations twins on {001}.
- Cleavage: imperfect to fair {110}
- Fracture: irregular to uneven, vaguely conchoidal, the mineral is brittle
- Tenacity: brittle
- Mohs scale hardness: 4.5
- Luster: vitreous to adamantine
- Streak: white to grayish yellow
- Diaphaneity: transparent to opaque
- Density: 6.1–6.6 (calculated)
- Pleochroism: non-pleochroic

Eulytine (German: Eulytin from Ancient Greek: εΰλυτος, fusible, easily dissolved) or bismuth blende (obsolete) is one of the rarest minerals in nature. The composition is bismuth silicate with the calculation formula Bi_{4}(SiO_{4})_{3} or Bi_{4}Si_{3}O_{12}. The mineral forms isometric cubic crystals up to 2 mm in size, the supporting form of which is a tetrahedron or tristetrahedron. Among the varieties, there are also often concentric, fibrous or spherical aggregates of a very impressive appearance, which were previously called agricolites.

Eulytine is a secondary mineral, a product of the oxidation of bismuth and its compounds.

== Discovery history and name ==
The history of the discovery of the mineral is complex and confusing. At the beginning of the 19th century, eulytine was described by August Breithaupt over several years, moreover, three times and under different names. He was the first to describe eulytine agricolites under their modern name as spherical crystals with a glossy surface. A second description was given under the name bismuth blende, in which Breithaupt stated that he had known about this mineral for many years, but believed it to be sphalerite. In 1817, Breithaupt made a third description using Abraham Gottlob Werner's new mineralogical system, called or «arsenic-bismuth» (German: Arsenik-Wismuth).

In particular, Breithaupt wrote: “Thanks to arsenic-bismuth, an interesting new <mineral> species has arisen in the bismuth family, previously unknown, which appears to be a rare mineral. It has the following characteristics: dark hairy brown color, variously shaped <crystals> and formed small balls and hemispheres. The outside is matte, sometimes with a white coating; the inside is not very shiny — to very iridescent, sometimes with a greasy sheen. The fracture is vaguely conchoidal, diverges into tufts and asterisks of “small cracks,” but also encounters dense, uneven areas. A <complete> fracture into fragments and wedge-shaped fragments is possible; demonstrates clear attachment to very thin and concentric, individual edges with a curved shell <...>; soft, fairly fragile, likely to break easily, and heavy. <...> Arsenic-bismuth <(German: Arsenik-Wismuth)> is very similar in appearance to radiated blende <wurtzite>, but is always very different from it in color, softness, etc.”

The above passage represents the first documented description of eulytine, and the name of this mineral was in one chapter of this publication, as if having nothing to do with arsenic-bismuth, and the above text (with a description of the previously unknown “Arsenik-Bismuth”) was in another. Finally, after a short pause of sound reflection, Breithaupt accepted the identity of all three of their described minerals: eulytine, bismuth blende and arsenic-bismuth.

The type specimen of eulytine is kept at the Mining Academy, Freiberg, Germany.

== Properties ==
Most often, eulytine varieties are small in size, however, they stand out for their catchy and spectacular appearance. Transparent or translucent crystals are red-brown or green in color and do not exceed a few millimeters at the extreme points. Crystals are often individual tetrahedrons, often complexly modified, but there are also spherical varieties that have an almost perfectly spherical shape. Druses of crystals can consist of several individuals; compnativletely fused crystals are sometimes separated only by the protruding vertices of tetrahedrons; in rare cases, almost smooth spherical clusters grow into each other (the so-called agricolites). More often, eulytine occurs in the form of individual spherical aggregates.

Some varieties range from transparent to translucent to completely opaque. Color also varies in a wide range of shades: from dark brown and green to yellowish-gray, grayish-white, straw-yellow and colorless; in thin chips from colorless to pale brown.

The luster varies widely: from diamond to glassy, some slightly transparent or opaque varieties have a greasy or waxy luster. There is no pleochroism. The actual measured density is from 6.1 to 6.6 g/cm^{3}, the calculated one is 6.76 g/cm^{3}. Eulytine typically forms modified tetrahedral crystals with tristetrahedral shapes (often with a dominant positive tristetrahedron and a subordinate negative tristetrahedron), often with small cube faces between the tetrahedral shapes. Twinning at {001} is common.

== Mineral formation ==
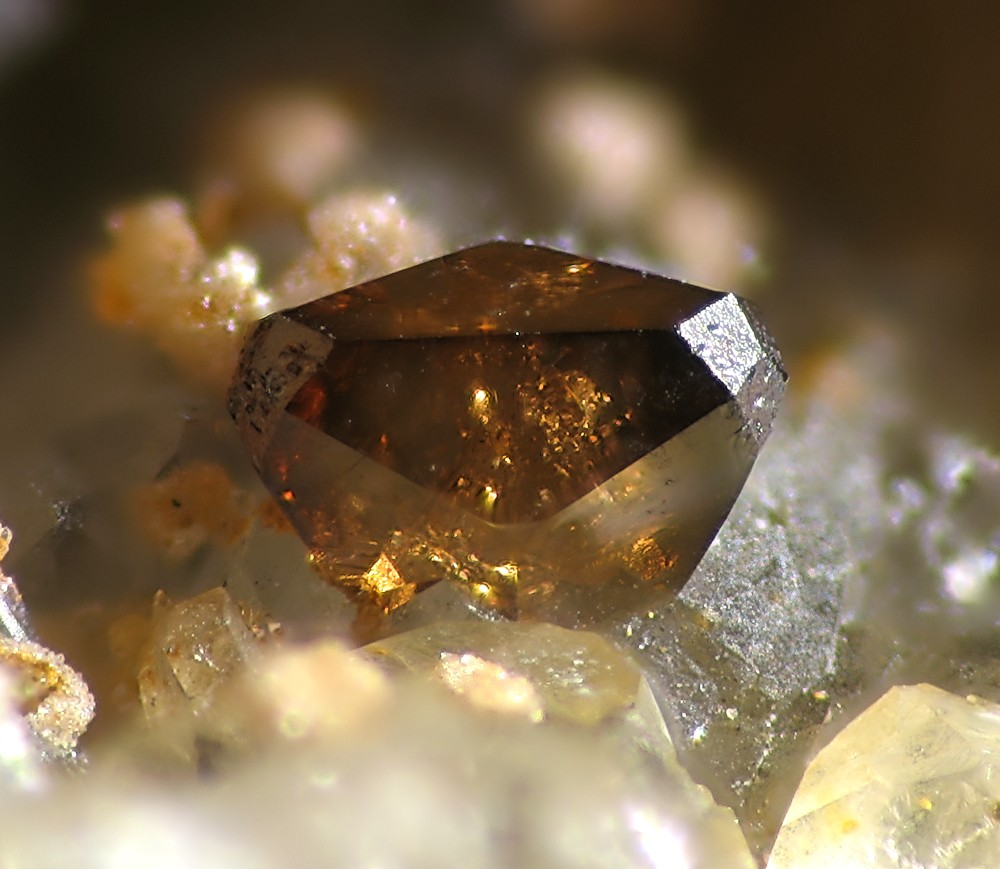
Eulytine (Saxony) crystal size ~ 2.5 mm.

Eulytine is one of the rarest minerals in nature, which made it very difficult to study in the 19th century. Vladimir Vernadsky considered eulytine to be one of the problem areas of contemporary mineralogy and classified it as “earthy, little studied bodies”, the further modifications and further metamorphism of which are unknown. As he believed, the transition of bismuth to eulytite requires further study and confirmation, and an indication of it could go to all mineralogical catalogs solely thanks to Breithaupt's description.

Eulytine was discovered together with quartz and native bismuth in Schneeberg and Johanngeorgenstadt (Germany). In the Caucasus, the mineral is found in albitized pegmatites in the form of tetrahedral crystals and crusts around tantalum grains.

== Occurrence ==
The type deposit of eulytine is located in Saxony (Schneeberg, Johanngeorgenstadt); in Germany this mineral was later discovered in Höchstberg, near Hausach, and in the Clara mines near Oberwolfach, Black Forest. In Romania, found in Dogneci (formerly Dognačka). In England — a deposit near Lanlivery, Cornwall; and also in Southwick, near Dalbeattie, Kirkcubrightshire (Scotland). In Canada, eulytine is known from the Evans-Loup mines, near Wakeld, Quebec.

In Russia, samples of eulytine were found at the Kvartalnoye deposit (Sverdlovsk Region, Asbestovsky District) and at the Syuigachan ore occurrence (Khabarovsk Territory, Verkhnebureinsky District).

== Usage ==
Eulytine crystals are used in high-precision technology for the production of optical quality ceramics. It is obtained by pressing small natural or synthetic crystals. The unique properties of eulytine make it possible to use it as a scintillator in high-energy physics, computed tomography and dosimetry. However, the rarity of the mineral and the defectiveness of natural crystals turned the raw material into an extremely rare, scarce material. This became the reason for carrying out numerous works on growing artificial crystals. Ceramics obtained from laboratory-grown raw materials have better scintillation characteristics.

A similar and one of the most promising materials for the above purposes is also single-crystalline bismuth orthogermanate with a eulytine-type structure. However, eulytine has better scintillation characteristics compared to bismuth orthogermanate. For example, in terms of exposure time (0.1 ms), eulytine exceeds it three times. Due to the complexity of growing eulytine single crystals from a high-viscosity melt, their production represents an important and promising technological problem, which several research teams worked on in the 2010s.

== See also ==
- Bismutite
- Bismuthinite
- Bismoclite
- Bismite
- Zavaritskite
