= Bismuth subsalicylate =

Antacid medication

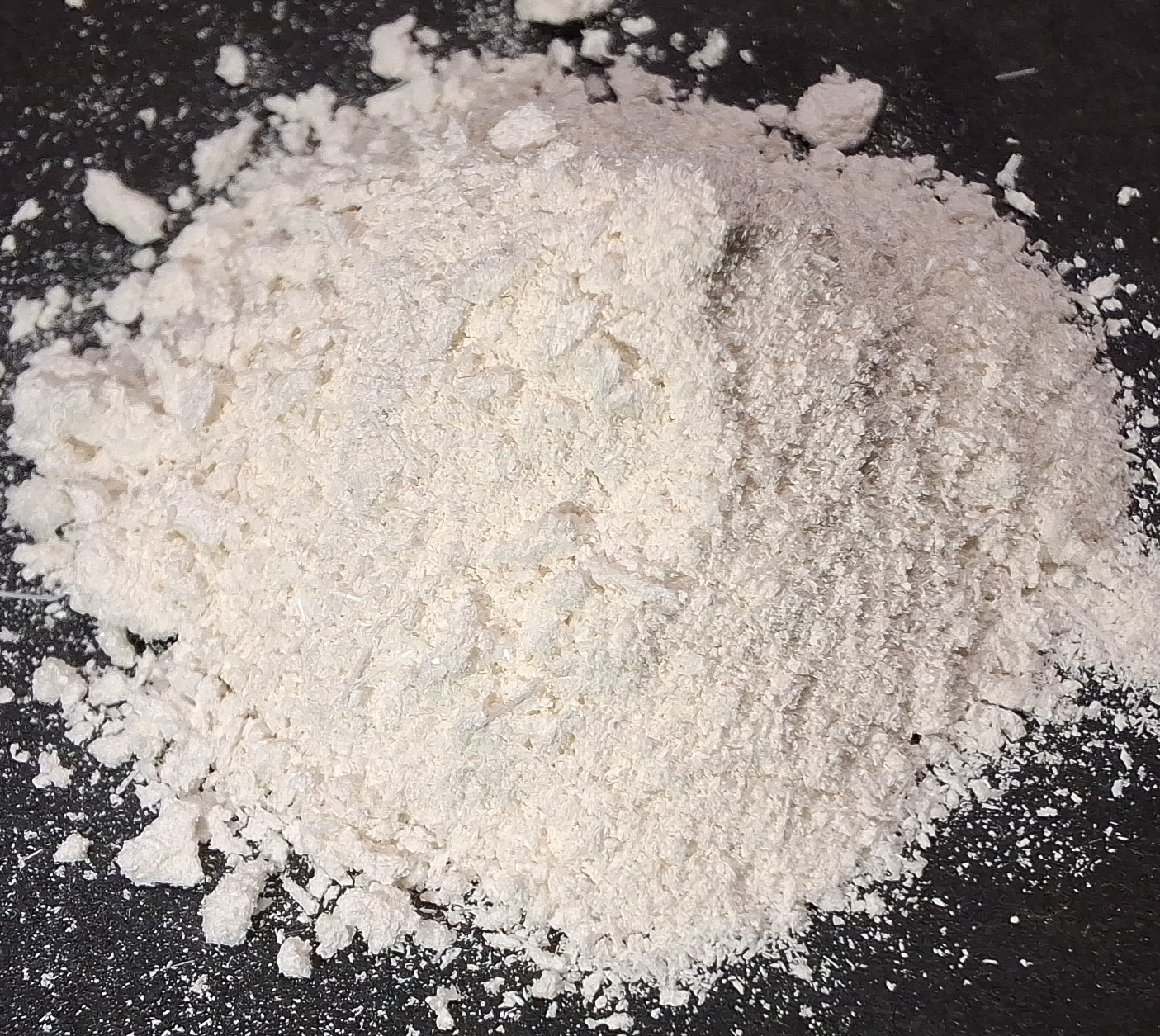
- Powdered form of pure bismuth subsalicylate

Clinical data
- Trade names: Pepto-Bismol, BisBacter, others
- Other names: Pink bismuth
- AHFS/Drugs.com: Multum Consumer Information
- MedlinePlus: a607040
- Routes of administration: Oral
- ATC code: none

Legal status
- Legal status: UK: P (Pharmacy medicines); US: OTC

Identifiers
- IUPAC name: 2-Hydroxy-2H,4H-benzo[d]1,3-dioxa-2-bismacyclohexan-4-one Simplified molecular structure of bismuth subsalicylate.
- CAS Number: 14882-18-9
- PubChem CID: 16682734
- DrugBank: DB01294
- ChemSpider: 17215772
- UNII: 62TEY51RR1
- KEGG: D00728
- ChEBI: CHEBI:261649
- ChEMBL: ChEMBL1120
- CompTox Dashboard (EPA): DTXSID6024622
- ECHA InfoCard: 100.035.397

Chemical and physical data
- Formula: C_{7}H_{5}BiO_{4}
- Molar mass: 362.093 g·mol^{−1}
- 3D model (JSmol): Interactive image
- SMILES: O[Bi]1OC(=O)C2CCCCC2O1
- InChI: InChI=1S/C7H6O3.Bi.H2O/c8-6-4-2-1-3-5(6)7(9)10;;/h1-4,8H,(H,9,10);;1H2/q;+3;/p-3; Key:ZREIPSZUJIFJNP-UHFFFAOYSA-K

Bismuth subsalicylate, sold generically as pink bismuth and under brand names including Pepto-Bismol, Pepti-Calm, and BisBacter, is a medication used to treat temporary discomfort of the stomach and gastrointestinal tract. This includes an upset stomach, heartburn, or other similar symptoms.

Bismuth subsalicylate has the empirical chemical formula C_{7}H_{5}BiO_{4} and is obtained by reacting bismuth(III) oxide (Bi_{2}O_{3}) and salicylic acid (HOC_{6}H_{4}COOH). Most liquid formulations of bismuth subsalicylate are suspensions and therefore must be shaken before use.

== Medical uses ==
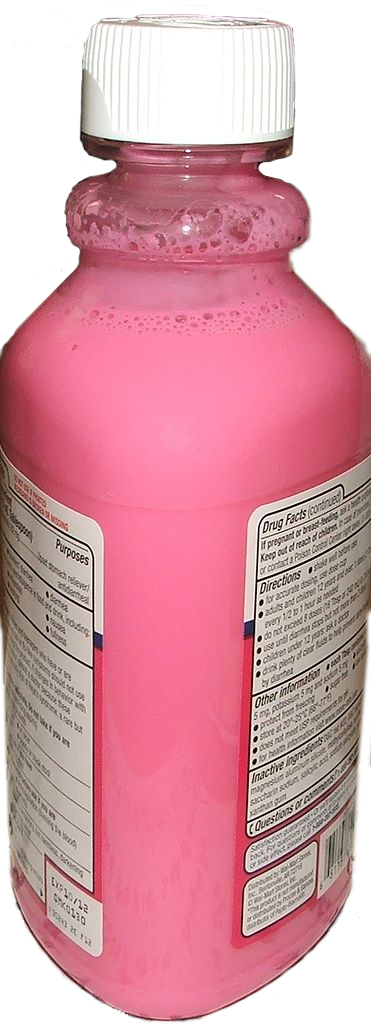
A generic version of Pepto-Bismol, back view

As a derivative of salicylic acid, bismuth subsalicylate displays anti-inflammatory and bactericidal action. It also acts as an antacid.

As a form of bismuth, bismuth subsalicylate is used in some Helicobacter pylori eradication protocols (the more conventional choice is bismuth subcitrate).

== Mechanism of action ==
Bismuth subsalicylate is used as an antacid and antidiarrheal, and to treat some other gastrointestinal symptoms, such as nausea. The means by which this occurs is still not well documented. It is thought to be some combination of the following:

- Stimulation of absorption of fluids and electrolytes by the intestinal wall (antisecretory action)
- As a salicylate, reducing inflammation/irritation of stomach and intestinal lining through inhibition of prostaglandin G/H synthase 1/2
- Reduction in hypermotility of the stomach
- Inhibits adhesion and filmogenesis by Escherichia coli
- Bactericidal action of a number of its subcomponents, including salicylic acid
- Bactericidal action via a so-called oligodynamic effect in which small amounts of heavy metals such as bismuth damage many different bacteria species.
- Weak antacid properties

In vitro and in vivo data have shown that bismuth subsalicylate hydrolyzes in the gut to bismuth oxychloride and salicylic acid and less commonly bismuth hydroxide. In the stomach, this is likely an acid-catalyzed hydrolysis. The salicylic acid is absorbed and therapeutical concentrations of salicylic acid can be found in blood after bismuth subsalicylate administration. Bismuth oxychloride and bismuth hydroxide are both believed to have bactericidal effects, as is salicylic acid for enterotoxigenic E. coli, a common cause of "traveler's diarrhea".

Organobismuth compounds have historically been used in growth media for selective isolation of microorganisms. Such salts have been shown to inhibit proliferation of Helicobacter pylori, other enteric bacteria, and some fungi.

== Adverse effects ==
The most common side effect of bismuth subsalicylate use is black stools or a black tongue. This is caused by a reaction with trace amounts of sulfur compounds in the user's large intestine or saliva that forms bismuth sulfide, a highly insoluble salt that is black in color. The discoloration is temporary and harmless.

Long-term use (more than six weeks) of bismuth subsalicylate may lead to accumulation and toxicity. High daily intake over a period of months can possibly cause severe fatigue, weakness and neurological symptoms that reverse with discontinuation. Some of the risks of salicylism can apply to the use of bismuth subsalicylate.

Children should not take medication with bismuth subsalicylate while recovering from influenza or chickenpox, as epidemiologic evidence points to an association between the use of salicylate-containing medications during certain viral infections and the onset of Reye syndrome. For the same reason, it is typically recommended that nursing mothers not use medication containing bismuth subsalicylate because small amounts of the medication are excreted in human breast milk, and these pose a theoretical risk of Reye syndrome to nursing children.

Salicylates are very toxic to cats, and thus bismuth subsalicylate should not be administered to cats.

The British National Formulary does not recommend bismuth-containing antacids (unless chelated), cautioning that absorbed bismuth can be neurotoxic, causing encephalopathy, and that such antacids tend to be constipating.

== Drug interactions ==
There is an increased risk of bleeding when using bismuth subsalicylate and anticoagulation therapy, like warfarin.

== History ==
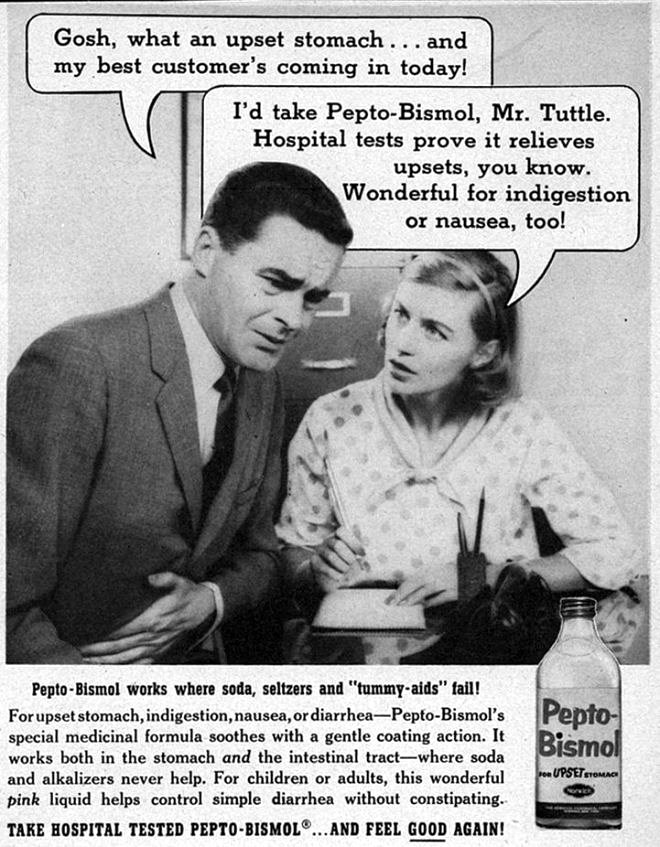
1957 Life magazine ad for the product

Bismuth salts were in use in Europe by the late 1700s. The combination of bismuth subsalicylate and zinc salts for astringency with salol (phenyl salicylate) appears to have begun in the US in the early 20th century as a remedy for life-threatening diarrhea in infants with cholera. At first sold directly to physicians, it was first marketed as Bismosal in 1918.

Pepto-Bismol was first sold in 1900 by a doctor in New York. It was originally sold as a remedy for infant diarrhea by Norwich Pharmacal Company under the name "Bismosal: Mixture Cholera Infantum". It was renamed Pepto-Bismol in 1919. Norwich Eaton Pharmaceuticals was acquired by Procter and Gamble in 1982.

As of 1946 and 1959, Canadian advertisements placed by Norwich show the product as Pepto-Besmal both in graphic and text.

Pepto-Bismol is an over-the-counter drug currently produced by the Procter & Gamble company in the United States, Canada and the United Kingdom. Pepto-Bismol is made in chewable tablets and swallowable caplets, but it is best known for its original formula, which is a thick liquid. This original formula is a medium pink in color, with a teaberry (methyl salicylate) flavor.

Generic bismuth subsalicylate and other branded versions of the drug are widely available in pill and liquid form.

== Structure ==
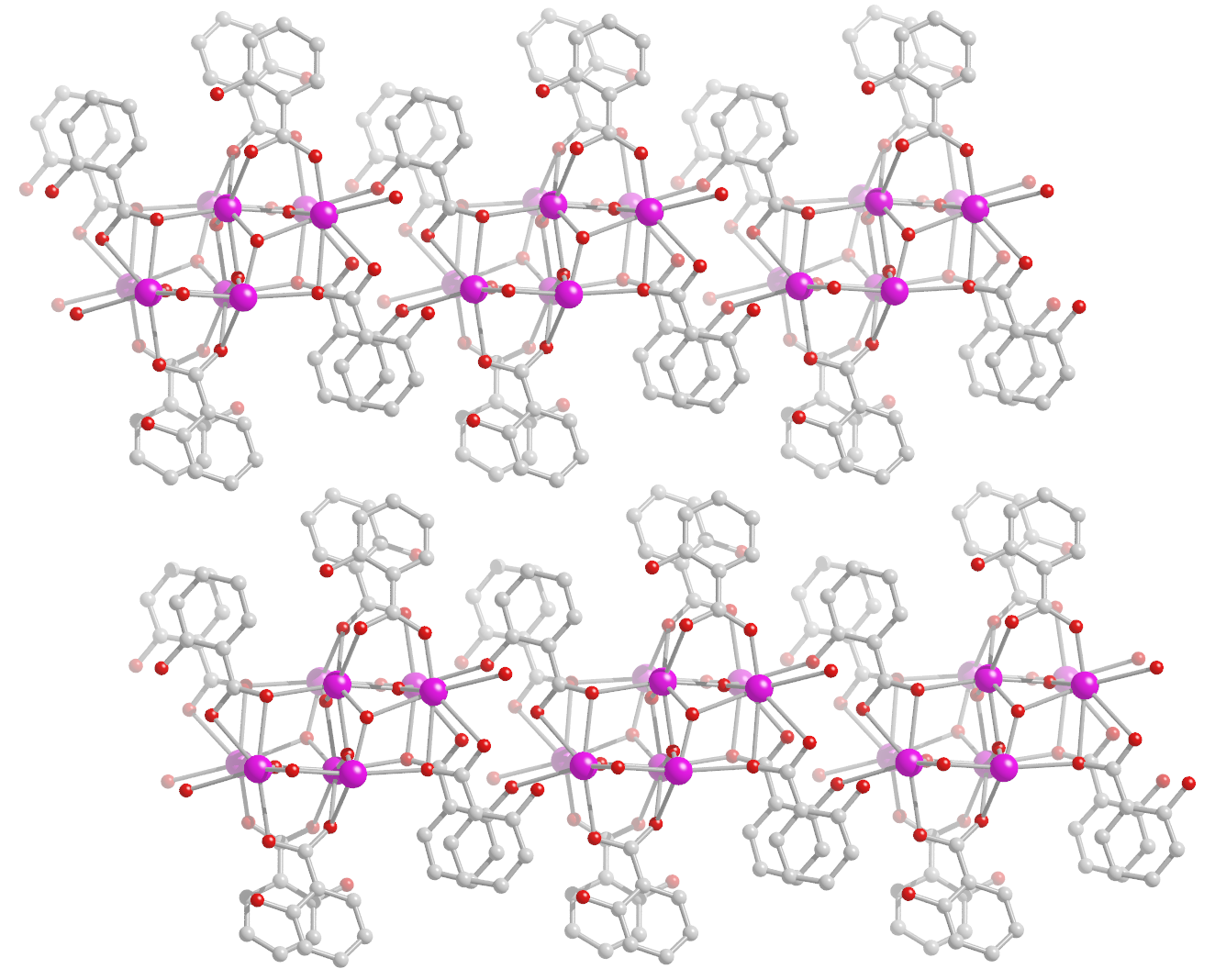
The crystal structure of bismuth subsalicylate.

Despite its common usage and commercial significance, the exact structure of the pharmaceutical long remained undetermined, but was revealed, through the use of advanced electron crystallography techniques, to be a layered coordination polymer with the formula BiO(C_{7}H_{5}O_{3}). In the structure, both the carboxylate and phenol groups of the salicylate coordinate towards the bismuth cations. The determination of bismuth subsalicylate had long been hindered by the small particle size as well as defects within the structure, arising from variations in the stacking arrangement of the bismuth subsalicylate layers, which could be observed as part of the structural investigation.
