= Bismuth germanate =

Inorganic chemical compound of bismuth, germanium and oxygen

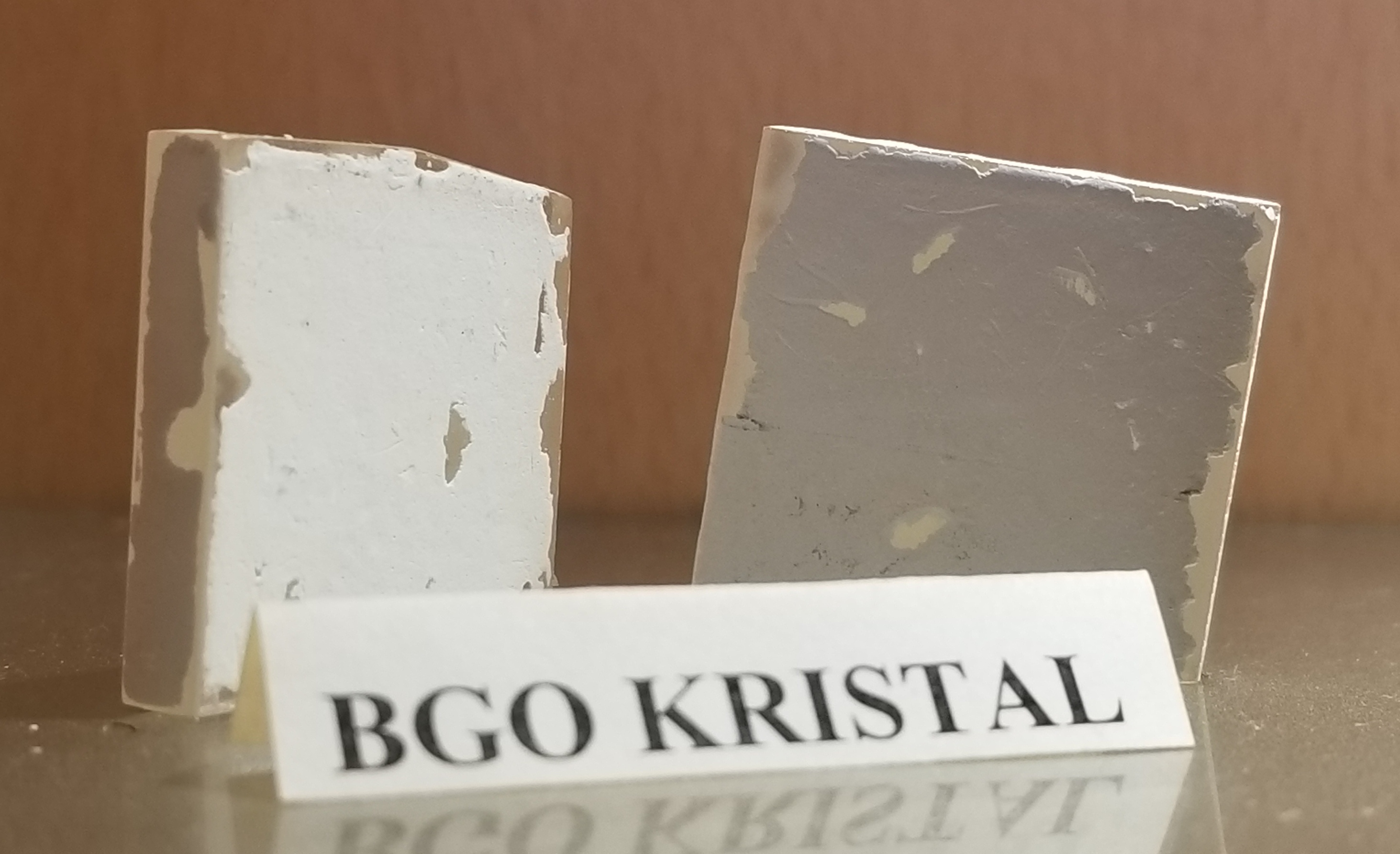
BGO scintillator crystals covered with a (partly dilapidated) white paint mask

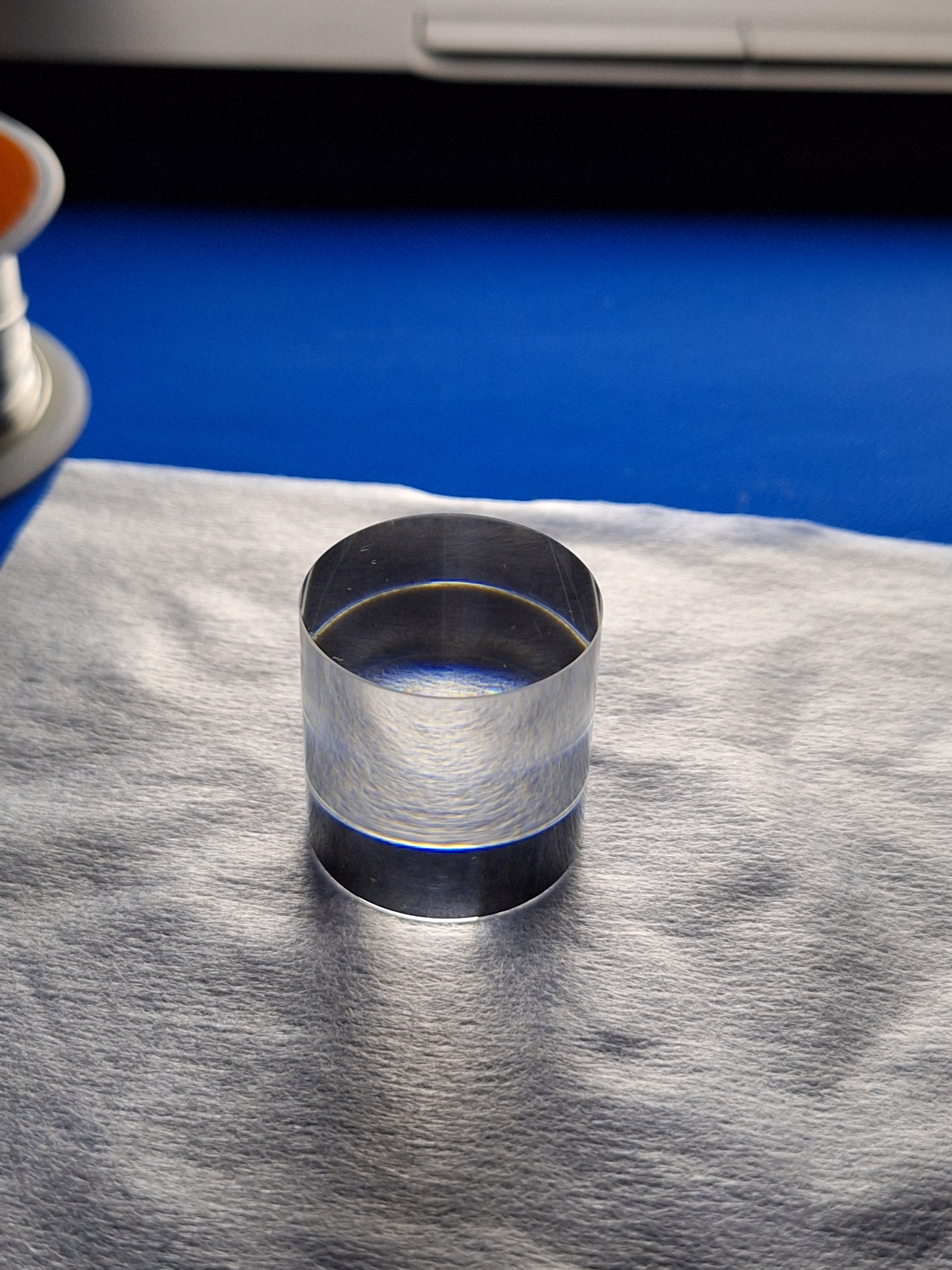
1-inch diameter, 1-inch tall crystal of BGO. BGO degenerates under UV light, so here it is illuminated with an LCD laptop screen to ensure minimal UV exposure.

Bismuth germanium oxide or bismuth germanate is an inorganic chemical compound of bismuth, germanium and oxygen. Most commonly the term refers to the compound with chemical formula Bi_{4}Ge_{3}O_{12} (BGO), with the cubic eulytine crystal structure, used as a scintillator. (The term may also refer to a different compound with formula Bi_{12}GeO_{20}, an electro-optical material with sillenite structure, and Bi_{2}Ge_{3}O_{9}.)

== Bi_{4}Ge_{3}O_{12} ==
Bi_{4}Ge_{3}O_{12} has a cubic crystal structure (a = 1.0513 nm, z = 4, Pearson symbol cI76, space group I4̅3d No. 220) and a density of 7.12 g/cm^{3}. When irradiated by X-rays or gamma rays it emits photons of wavelengths between 375 and 650 nm, with peak at 480 nm it produces about 8500 photons per megaelectronvolt of the high energy radiation absorbed. It has good radiation hardness (parameters remaining stable up to 5.10^{4} Gy), high scintillation efficiency, good energy resolution between 5 and 20 MeV, is mechanically strong, and is not hygroscopic. Its melting point is 1050 °C. It is the most common oxide-based scintillator.

Bismuth germanium oxide is used in detectors in particle physics, aerospace physics, nuclear medicine, geology exploration, and other industries. Bismuth germanate arrays are used for gamma pulse spectroscopy. BGO crystals are also used in positron emission tomography detectors.

Commercially available crystals are grown by the Czochralski process and usually supplied in the form of cuboids or cylinders. Large crystals can be obtained. Crystal production is typically done around 1100 °C, i.e. around 50 °C above its melting point.

== Bi_{12}GeO_{20} ==
Bi_{12}GeO_{20} has a cubic crystal structure (a = 1.01454 nm, z = 2, Pearson symbol cI66, space group I23 No. 197) and a density of 9.22 g/cm^{3}. This bismuth germanate has high electro-optic coefficients (3.3 pm/V for Bi_{12}GeO_{20}), making it useful in nonlinear optics for building Pockels cells, and can also be used for photorefractive devices for ultraviolet range.

The Bi_{12}GeO_{20} crystals are piezoelectric, show strong electro-optical and acousto-optical effects, and find limited use in the field of crystal oscillators and surface acoustic wave devices. Single crystal rods and fibers can be grown by floating zone process from a rod of mixture of bismuth oxide and germanium oxide. The crystals are transparent and brown colored.

The crystals of BGO and similar compounds BSO (Bi_{12}SiO_{20}, bismuth silicon oxide, sillenite) and BTO (Bi_{12}TiO_{20}), are photorefractive and photoconductive. BGO and BSO crystals are efficient photoconductors with low dark conductivity. They can be used in electro-optical applications, like optical PROM, PRIZ spatial light modulators, realtime hologram recording, correlators, and systems for adaptive correction of ultrashort laser pulses, and in fiber optic sensors for electric and magnetic fields. Waveguide structures allow uniform illumination over wide spectral range. Thin film sillenite structures, which can be deposited e.g. by sputtering, have wide range of potential applications. BSO crystals are used in optically addressed spatial light modulators and in liquid crystal light valves. The optical activity of BTO is much smaller than of BGO and BSO. Unlike somewhat similar performing perovskites, sillenites aren't ferroelectric.

The materials can find use in phased-array optics.

When sputtering, the target has to be kept below 450 °C as otherwise the bismuth vapor pressure would get the composition out of stoichiometry, but above 400 °C to form the piezoelectric γ phase.

== See also ==
- Scintillating bolometer
- Germanate
