= Bismuth titanate =

Bi_{12}TiO_{20}
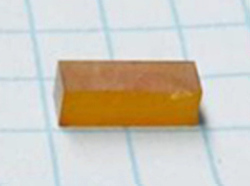
- Bi_{12}TiO_{20} crystal

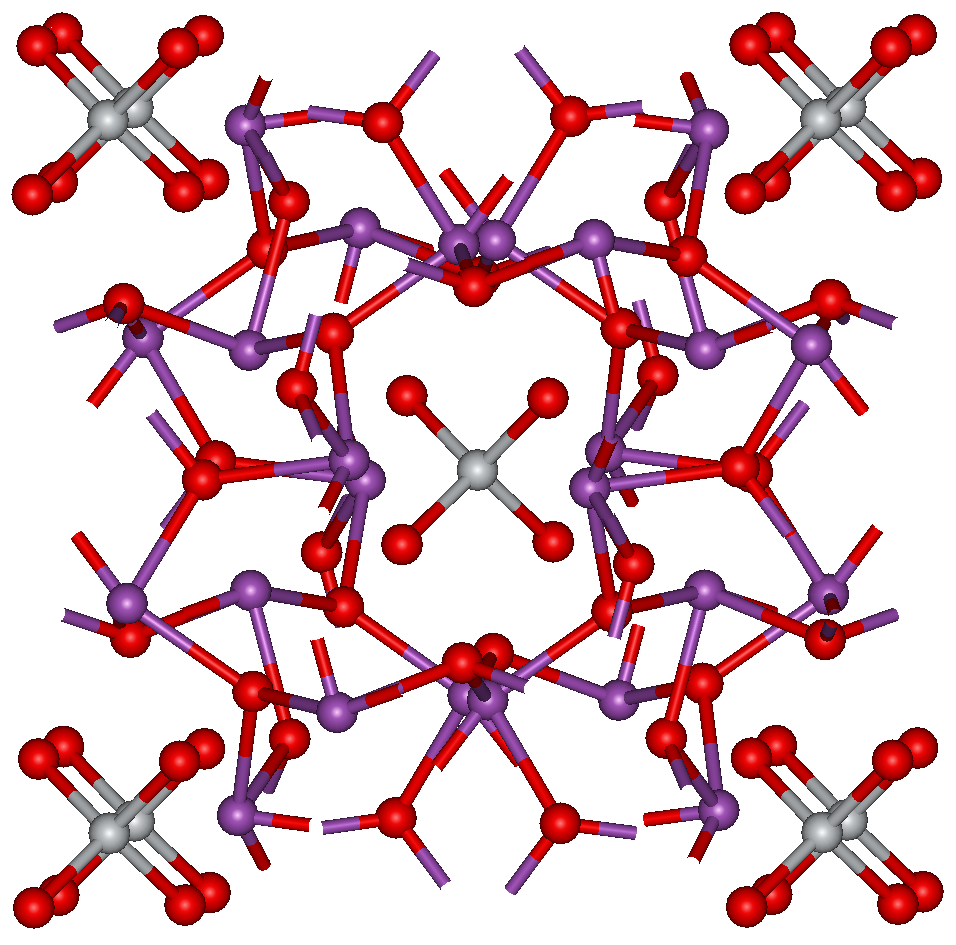
- Bi_{12}TiO_{20} crystal structure

Names
- Other names Bismuth titanium oxide, dodecabismuth titanate

Identifiers
CAS Number	12441-73-5
3D model (JSmol)	Interactive image
ChemSpider	27472572
PubChem CID	56846075
- InChI: InChI=1S/12Bi.20O.Ti Key: LIHXTGNDEGWZNF-UHFFFAOYSA-N
- SMILES: O=[Ti]=O.O=[Bi]O[Bi]=O.O=[Bi]O[Bi]=O.O=[Bi]O[Bi]=O.O=[Bi]O[Bi]=O.O=[Bi]O[Bi]=O.O=[Bi]O[Bi]=O

Properties
Chemical formula	Bi_{12}TiO_{20}
Molar mass	2875.62
Odor	odorless
Density	9.03 g/cm^{3}
Melting point	875 °C (1,607 °F; 1,148 K) Decomposes to Bi_{4}Ti_{3}O_{12} and Bi_{2}O_{3}
Solubility in water	insoluble

Structure
Crystal structure	body-centered cubic, cI66
Space group	I23, No. 197

Related compounds
Other cations	Bismuth silicon oxide
- Except where otherwise noted, data are given for materials in their standard state (at 25 °C [77 °F], 100 kPa). Infobox references

Bi_{4}Ti_{3}O_{12}
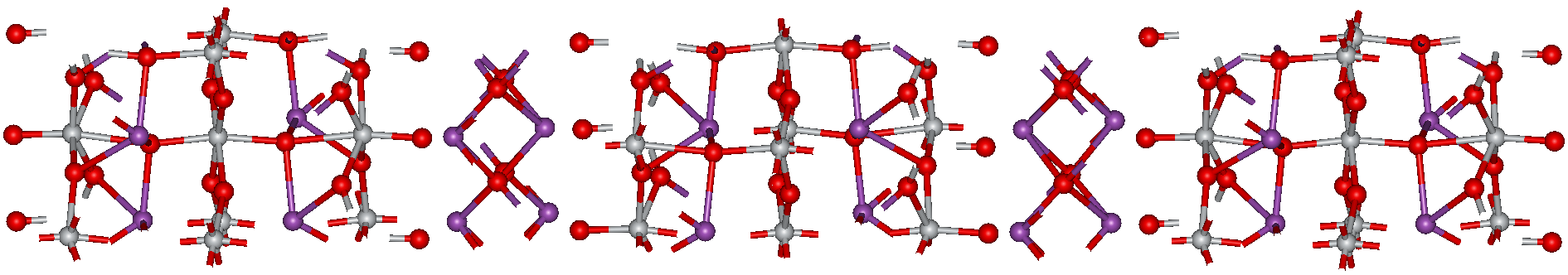
- Bi_{4}Ti_{3}O_{12} crystal structure

Names
- Other names Bismuth titanium oxide

Identifiers
CAS Number	12010-77-4
3D model (JSmol)	Interactive image
ChemSpider	10637934
EC Number	234-564-6
PubChem CID	138395175
- InChI: InChI=1S/4Bi.12O.3Ti/q4*+3;12*-2;3*+4 Key: LEVGIWAPKXUVTE-UHFFFAOYSA-N
- SMILES: [O-2].[O-2].[O-2].[O-2].[O-2].[O-2].[O-2].[O-2].[O-2].[O-2].[O-2].[O-2].[Ti+4].[Ti+4].[Ti+4].[Bi+3].[Bi+3].[Bi+3].[Bi+3]

Properties
Chemical formula	Bi_{4}Ti_{3}O_{12}
Molar mass	1171.5
Odor	odorless
Density	7.95 g/cm^{3}
Solubility in water	insoluble
Band gap	3.5 eV

Structure
Crystal structure	Orthorhombic, oS76
Space group	Aba2, No. 41
- Except where otherwise noted, data are given for materials in their standard state (at 25 °C [77 °F], 100 kPa). Infobox references

Bi_{2}Ti_{2}O_{7}
Identifiers
CAS Number	12010-68-3; 12048-51-0; 11115-71-2
3D model (JSmol)	Interactive image
ChemSpider	145402
EC Number	234-986-0
PubChem CID	165913
- InChI: InChI=1S/2Bi.7O.2Ti/q2*+3;7*-2;2*+4 Key: VDESGIACEFVDCZ-UHFFFAOYSA-N
- SMILES: [O-2].[O-2].[O-2].[O-2].[O-2].[O-2].[O-2].[Ti+4].[Ti+4].[Bi+3].[Bi+3]

Properties
Chemical formula	Bi_{2}O_{7}Ti_{2}
Molar mass	625.688 g·mol^{−1}
Odor	odorless
Solubility in water	insoluble
- Except where otherwise noted, data are given for materials in their standard state (at 25 °C [77 °F], 100 kPa). Infobox references

Bismuth titanate or bismuth titanium oxide is a solid inorganic compound of bismuth, titanium and oxygen with the chemical formula of Bi_{12}TiO_{20}, Bi_{4}Ti_{3}O_{12} or Bi_{2}Ti_{2}O_{7}.

== Synthesis ==
Bismuth titanate ceramics can be produced by heating a mixture of bismuth and titanium oxides. Bi_{12}TiO_{20} forms at 730–850 °C, and melts when the temperature is raised above 875 °C, decomposing in the melt to Bi_{4}Ti_{3}O_{12} and Bi_{2}O_{3}.

3 Bi_{12}TiO_{20} → Bi_{4}Ti_{3}O_{12} + 16 Bi_{2}O_{3}

Millimeter-sized single crystals of Bi_{12}TiO_{20} can be grown by the Czochralski process, from the molten phase at 880–900 °C.

== Properties and applications ==
Bismuth titanates exhibit electrooptical effect and photorefractive effect, that is, a reversible change in the refractive index under applied electric field or illumination, respectively. Consequently, they have potential applications in reversible recording media for real-time holography or image processing applications.

== See also ==
- Bismuth germanate
- Sillénite
