= Bismuth silicon oxide =

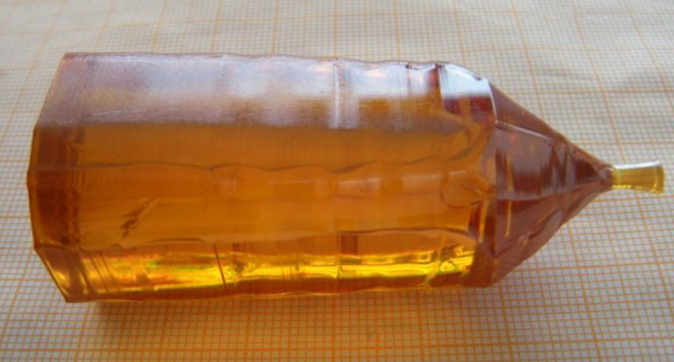
- Bi_{12}SiO_{20} crystal

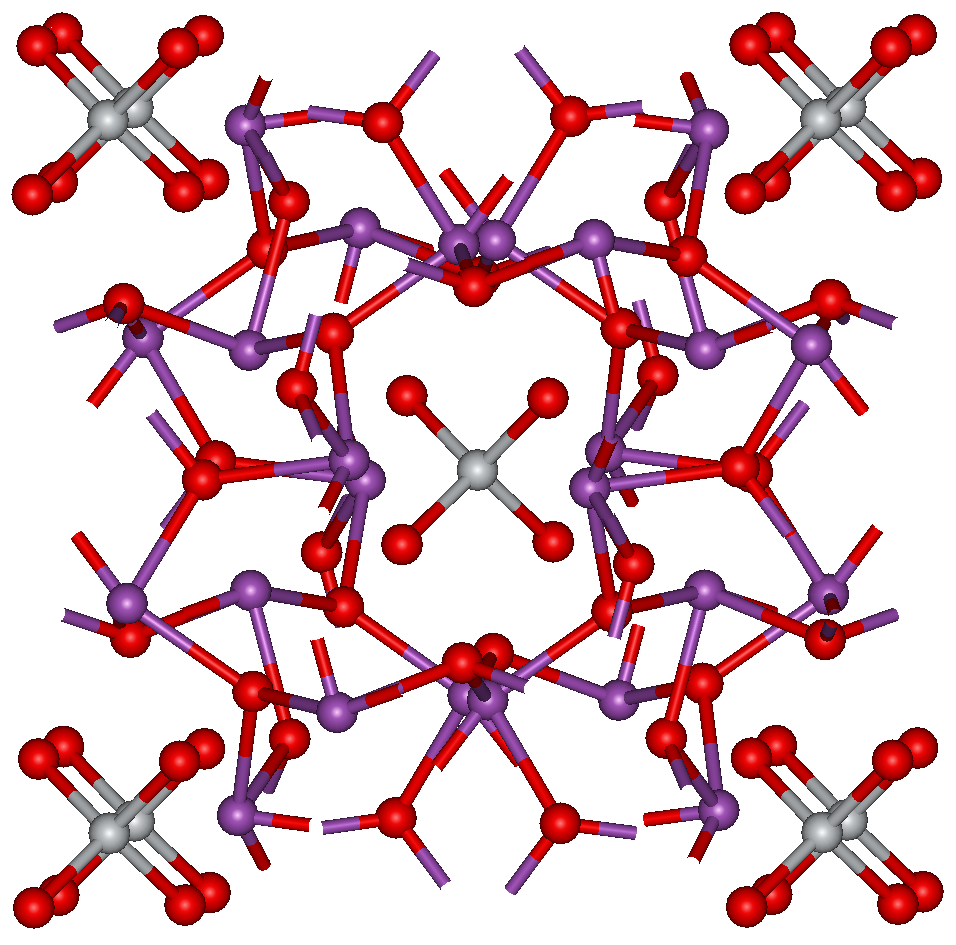
- Bi_{12}SiO_{20} crystal structure

Names
- Other names Sillénite; Bismuth silicate

Identifiers
| CAS Number | 12377-72-9 |
| 3D model (JSmol) | Interactive image |
| ChemSpider | 23354126 |
| ECHA InfoCard | 100.032.369 |
| EC Number | 235-620-2 |
| PubChem CID | 73555496 |
| CompTox Dashboard (EPA) | DTXSID201014301 |
- InChI: InChI=1S/12Bi.O4Si.16O/c;;;;;;;;;;;;1-5(2,3)4;;;;;;;;;;;;;;;;/q12*+3;-4;16*-2 Key: JLXRQKOSFUIFEC-UHFFFAOYSA-N
- SMILES: [O-2].[O-2].[O-2].[O-2].[O-2].[O-2].[O-2].[O-2].[O-2].[O-2].[O-2].[O-2].[O-2].[O-2].[O-2].[O-2].[O-][Si]([O-])([O-])[O-].[Bi+3].[Bi+3].[Bi+3].[Bi+3].[Bi+3].[Bi+3].[Bi+3].[Bi+3].[Bi+3].[Bi+3].[Bi+3].[Bi+3]

Properties
| Chemical formula | Bi_{12}SiO_{20} |
| Molar mass | 2855.82 |
| Odor | odorless |
| Density | 9.20 g/cm^{3} |
| Melting point | 800 °C |
| Solubility in water | insoluble |

Structure
| Crystal structure | Body-centered cubic, cI66 |
| Space group | I23, No. 197 |
- Except where otherwise noted, data are given for materials in their standard state (at 25 °C [77 °F], 100 kPa). verify (what is ?) Infobox references

Bismuth silicon oxide or bismuth silicate refers to an inorganic compound of bismuth, silicon and oxygen. The bismuth silicate Bi_{12}SiO_{20} is most commonly encountered, though others are also known. It occurs naturally as the mineral sillénite and can be produced synthetically by heating a mixture of bismuth oxide and silicon dioxide. Centimeter-sized single crystals of Bi_{12}SiO_{20} can be grown by the Czochralski process from the molten phase. They exhibit piezoelectric, electro-optic, elasto-optic, photorefractive and photoconductive properties, and therefore have potential applications in spatial light modulators, acoustic delay lines and hologram recording equipment. Bi_{12}SiO_{20} can be obtained as a whitish powder with band gap of approximately 3.2 eV starting from bismuth subcarbonate and silica in presence of ethyleneglycol. ^{29}Si solid-state NMR is used to prove that the Si(IV) cations are sharing oxygen atoms with the Bi(III) cations. The ^{29}Si chemical shift (δ) in Bi_{12}SiO_{20} is −78.1 ppm. Unlike bismuth oxide, the presence of the acidic Si(IV) cations avoid the reactivity with CO_{2}.

Other bismuth silicates are known, such as Bi_{4}Si_{3}O_{12}, Bi_{2}SiO_{5}, and Bi_{2}Si_{3}O_{9}.
