= Dicaesium silver hexabromobismuthate =

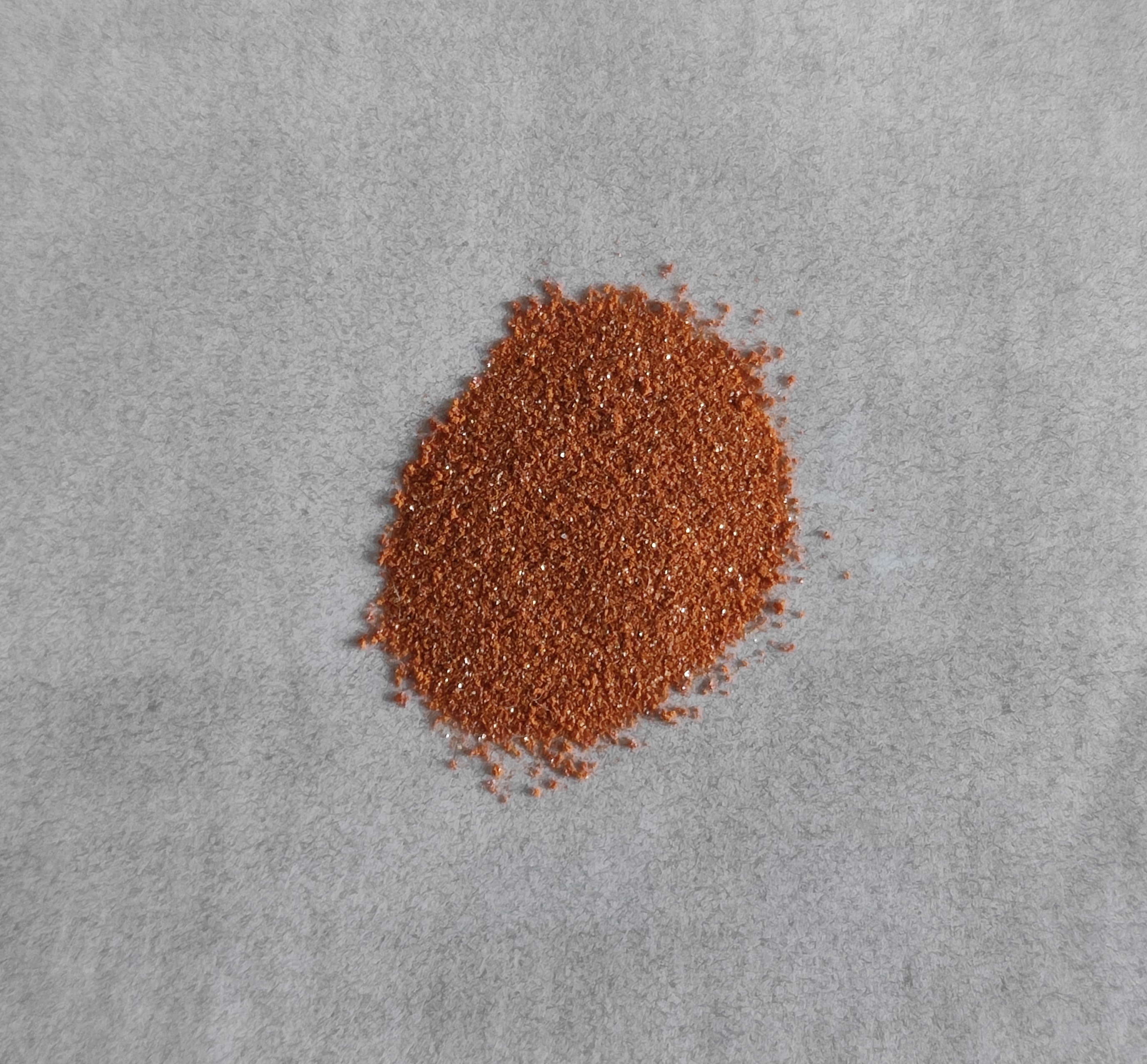

Identifiers
CAS Number	1879918-25-8
3D model (JSmol)	Interactive image
- InChI: InChI=1S/Ag.Bi.6BrH.2Cs/h;;6*1H;;/q+1;+3;;;;;;;2*+1/p-6 Key: BGOXDRLKIQGIDG-UHFFFAOYSA-H
- SMILES: [Cs+].[Cs+].[Ag+].Br[Bi-3](Br)(Br)(Br)(Br)Br

Properties
Chemical formula	AgBiBr_{6}Cs_{2}
Molar mass	1062.084 g·mol^{−1}
Appearance	Orange crystals

Related compounds
Related compounds	Caesium enneabromodibismuthate Caesium hexabromobismuthate
- Except where otherwise noted, data are given for materials in their standard state (at 25 °C [77 °F], 100 kPa). Infobox references

Dicaesium silver hexabromobismuthate is an inorganic compound with the chemical formula Cs_{2}AgBiBr_{6}. Being a stable double perovskite material, it is applied to photocatalytic reduction of carbon dioxide.

== Synthesis ==
Dicaesium silver hexabromobismuthate can be synthesized by mixing stoichiometrical caesium bromide, silver bromide and bismuth(III) bromide in 48% hydrobromic acid. Its nanocrystals can be prepared using the hot-injection method in organic solvent at higher temperature.
