= Bismite =

Bismuth trioxide, or Bi2O3

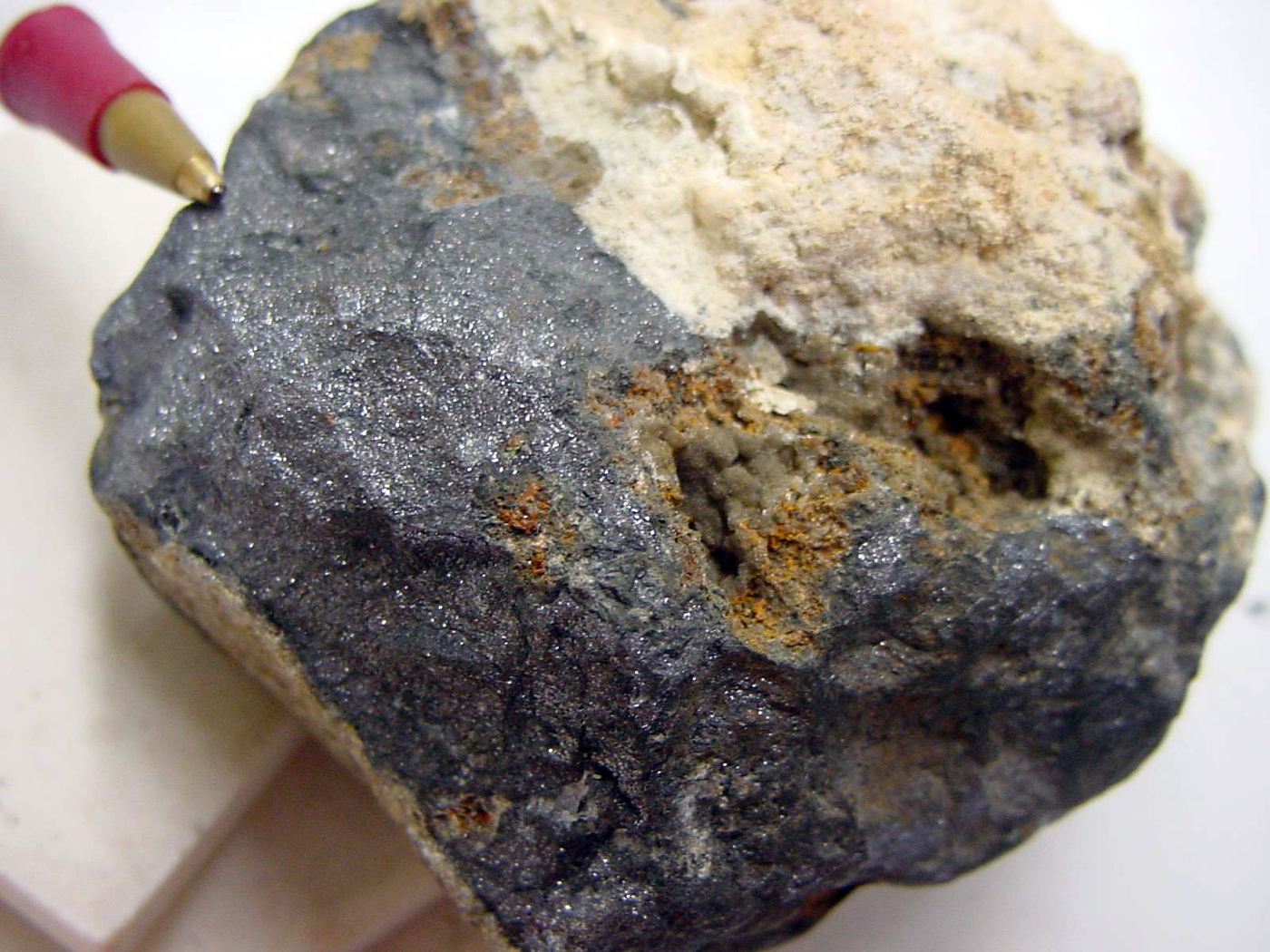
- Bismite

General
- Category: Oxide minerals
- Formula: Bi_{2}O_{3}
- IMA symbol: Bis
- Strunz classification: 4.CB.60
- Crystal system: Monoclinic
- Crystal class: Prismatic (2/m) (same H-M symbol)
- Space group: P2_{1}/c

Identification
- Color: Grey
- Fracture: Uneven
- Streak: Grey to black

Bismite is a bismuth oxide mineral, bismuth trioxide or Bi_{2}O_{3}. It is a monoclinic mineral, but the typical form of occurrence is massive and clay-like with no macroscopic crystals. The color varies from green to yellow. It has a Mohs hardness of 4 to 5 and a specific gravity of 8.5 to 9.5, quite high for a nonmetallic mineral.

Bismite is a secondary oxidation zone mineral which forms from primary bismuth minerals.

It was first described from Goldfield, Nevada in 1868, and later from the Schneeberg District, Ore Mountains, Saxony, Germany.

== See also ==
- Bismuth trioxide – details on the chemistry of this substance
- Bismutite
- Bismuthinite
- Bismoclite
- Eulytine
