= Caesium enneabromodibismuthate =

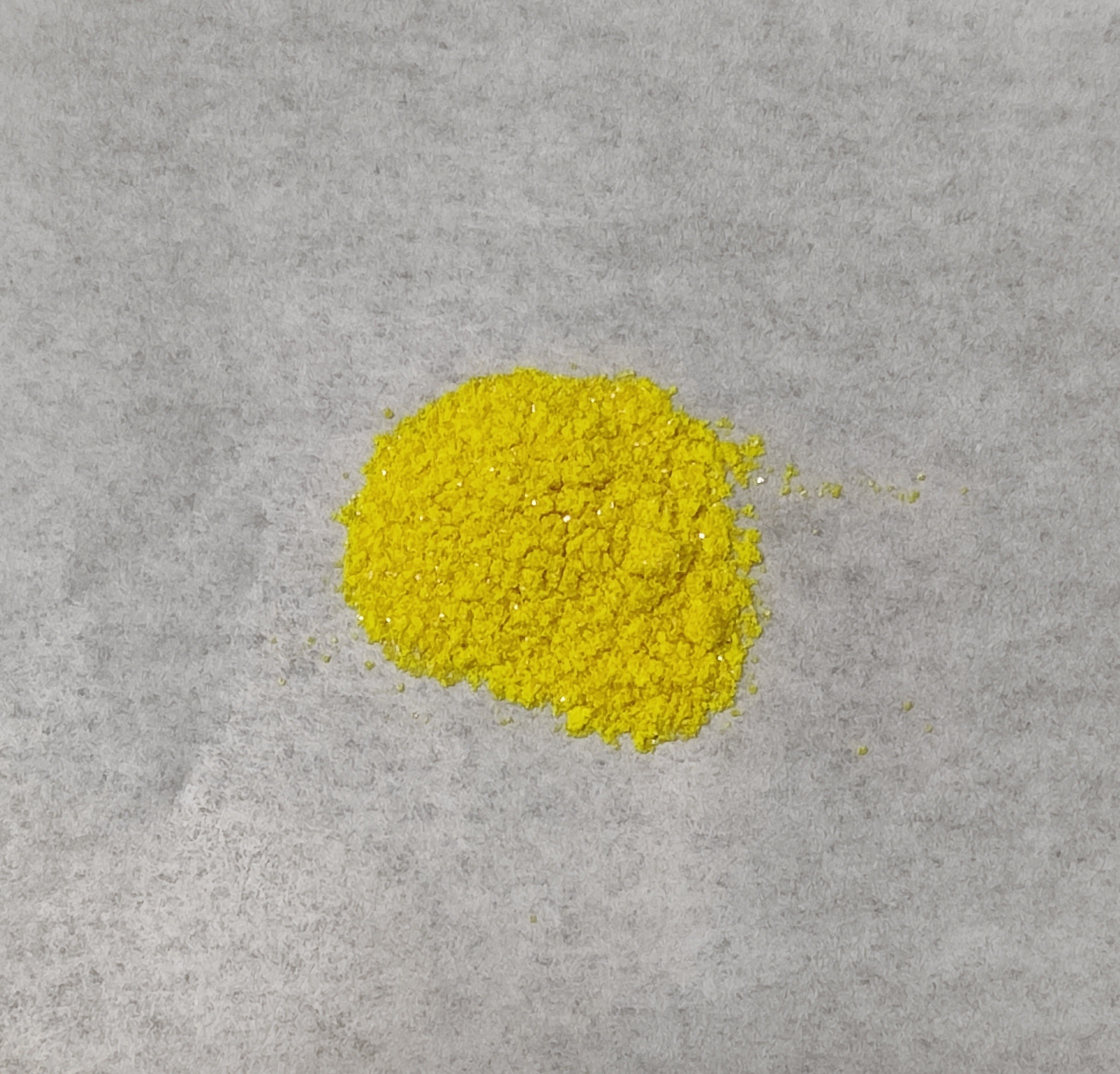

Identifiers
CAS Number	2270200-10-5
3D model (JSmol)	Interactive image
- InChI: InChI=1S/2Bi.7BrH.2Br.3Cs/h;;7*1H;;;;;/q2*+3;;;;;;;;2*-1;3*+1/p-7 Key: VNSDDZRTQJLTGI-UHFFFAOYSA-G
- SMILES: [Br-][Bi](Br)(Br)(Br)[Br-][Bi](Br)(Br)(Br)[Br-].[Cs+].[Cs+].[Cs+]

Properties
Chemical formula	Bi_{2}Br_{9}Cs_{3}
Molar mass	1535.813 g·mol^{−1}
Appearance	Yellow crystals
- Except where otherwise noted, data are given for materials in their standard state (at 25 °C [77 °F], 100 kPa). Infobox references

Caesium enneabromodibismuthate is an inorganic compound with the formula Cs_{3}Bi_{2}Br_{9}. It is one of the coordination complexes formed by caesium, bismuth and bromine. At room temperature, it is trigonal (P3̅m1) and it undergoes phase transformation to monoclinic phase (C12/c1) when the temperature is below 96 K.

== Preparation ==
Traditionally, it can be synthesized from a hydrobromic acid solution of stoichiometric amounts of caesium bromide and bismuth hydroxide or bismuth(III) oxide, crystals are formed by cooling the hot, saturated solution. It can also be obtained by reacting caesium bromide and bismuth(III) bromide in DMF, followed by vaporizing the solvent. Its nanocrystals can be synthesized in 1-octadecene at 170 °C using caesium oleate and bismuth(III) bromide as precursors.
