= Zavaritskite =

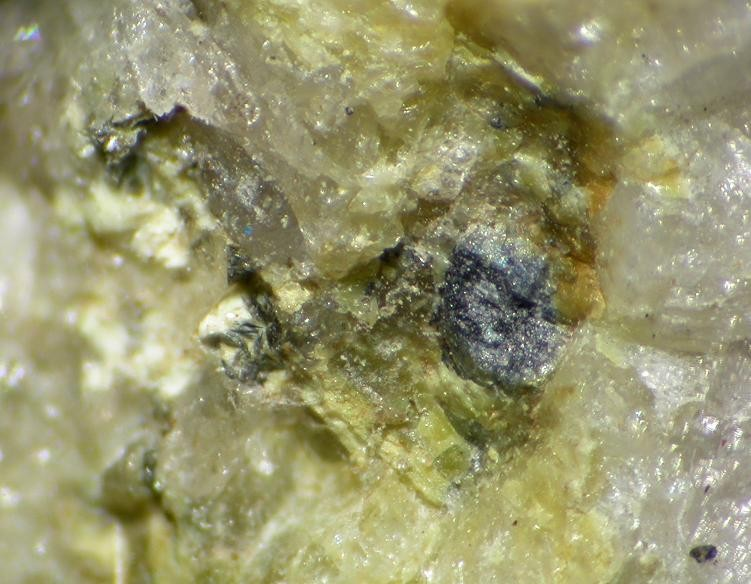

General
- Category: Halide mineral
- Formula: (BiO)F
- IMA symbol: Zav
- Strunz classification: III/D.10-70
- Dana classification: 10.02.01.01
- Crystal system: Tetragonal
- Crystal class: Halide mineral

Identification
- Color: Colorless to white
- Mohs scale hardness: 2–2.5
- Luster: Resinous to metallic
- Streak: Gray white
- Diaphaneity: Subtranslucent to opaque
- Specific gravity: 8.44 gm/cc
- Density: 7.88–9.00 (on average 8.44) g/sm^{3}
- Optical properties: Uniaxial (+/−), a = 2.21, b = 2.213, bire = 0.0030
- Refractive index: n_{α} = 2.210, n_{β} = 2.213
- Birefringence: δ = 2.210

Zavaritskite is a rare mineral of the halide class, bismuth oxyhalide with the chemical formula (BiO)F. It is named after the Soviet geologist and petrographer, academician of the USSR Academy of Sciences Alexander Nikolaevich Zavaritsky. It was discovered in 1962 by Soviet scientists. Zavaritskite is part of matlockite group of minerals.

== Description ==
Zavaritskite is a gray mineral with a greasy or semi-metallic luster; opaque, only slightly translucent in very small grains. The mineral powder is finely dispersed, colorless. The crystallization process of zavaritskite occurs in a square system, due to which the mineral forms sufficiently fine-grained powder cryptocrystalline aggregates.

The mineral is usually found together with bismuth, topaz, fluorite and others in the oxidized zone of the Sherlovogorsky deposit in Transbaikal. Zavaritskite was first described in 1962 by Soviet scientists E. I. Dolomanova, V. M. Senderova, and M. T. Yanchenko. It is one of the oxidation products of bismuthine, it is extremely rare.

== Formation and locations ==
Zavaritskite is formed secondarily as a weathering product of bismuthinite in bismuth-containing ore deposits. In addition to solid bismuth and bismuthinite, the mineral can also occur in paragenesis with bismutite and gold, among others.

As a rare mineral formation, zavaritskite has only been detected at a few sites, although so far (as of 2018) about 20 sites are known. In addition to Sherlovaya Gora in Russia, zavaritskite was discovered in quartz-topaz-siderophyllite greisen, which cut a granite pluton. Also, the mineral was discovered in Russia at the Nevskoe tungsten-tin deposit near Omsukchan in the Magadan Oblast, at Pitkyaranta in the Republic of Karelia, and at Mount Ploskaya in the Keivy Mountains on the Kola Peninsula.

Other known sites to date are Fielders Hill near Torrington (Clive County) and the Elsmore tin mine in Inverell Shire (Gough County) in the Australian state of New South Wales; the Beauvoir quarry near Échassières in the French département of Allier; the Ebisu pits near Nakatsugawa and Ashio near Nikkō on the Japanese island of Honshu; and several others.
