= Bismuth(III) sulfide =

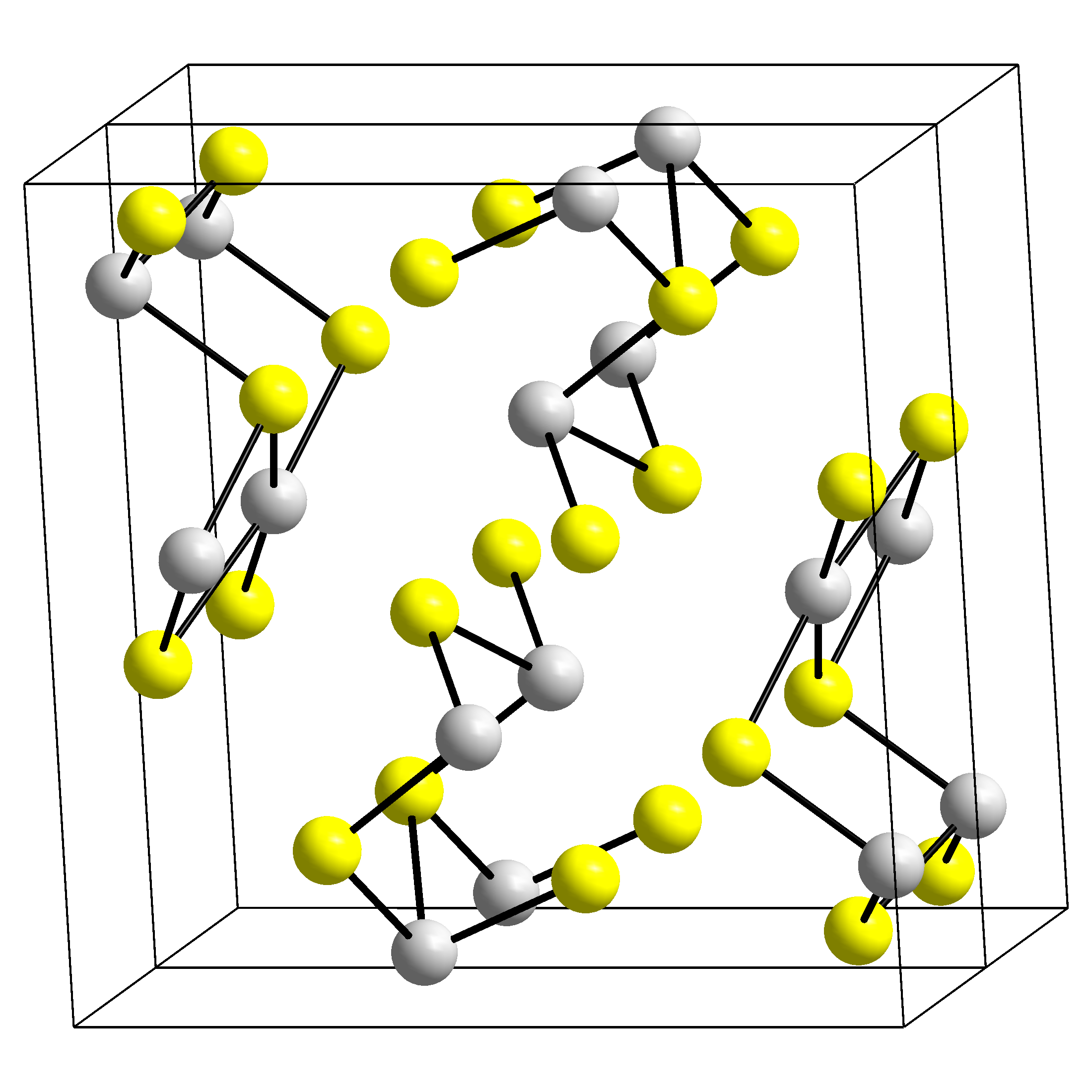

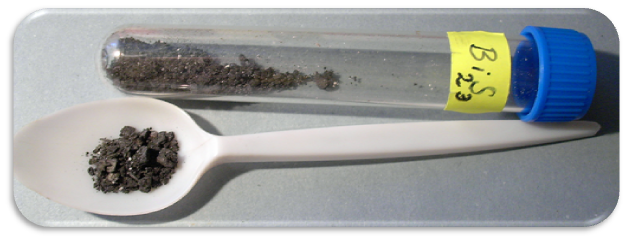

Names
- IUPAC name Bismuth(III) sulfide
- Other names Bismuth sulfide Dibismuth trisulfide

Identifiers
CAS Number	1345-07-9
3D model (JSmol)	Interactive image
ChemSpider	141425
ECHA InfoCard	100.014.287
EC Number	215-716-0
PubChem CID	16682960
UNII	XZC47M60X8
CompTox Dashboard (EPA)	DTXSID601014434
- InChI: InChI=1S/2Bi.3S/q2*+3;3*-2 Key: YNRGZHRFBQOYPP-UHFFFAOYSA-N; InChI=1/2Bi.3S/q2*+3;3*-2 Key: YNRGZHRFBQOYPP-UHFFFAOYAA
- SMILES: [BiH3+3].[BiH3+3].[S-2].[S-2].[S-2]

Properties
Chemical formula	Bi_{2}S_{3}
Molar mass	514.14 g·mol^{−1}
Appearance	brown powder
Density	6.78 g/cm^{3}
Melting point	850 ˚C
Solubility in water	insoluble
Solubility	soluble in acids
Magnetic susceptibility (χ)	−123.0·10^{−6} cm^{3}/mol

Hazards
- Occupational safety and health (OHS/OSH)
Main hazards	Irritant
- GHS labelling
Pictograms	(GHS07: Exclamation mark)
Signal word	Warning
Hazard statements	H315, H319, H335
Precautionary statements	P261, P264, P271, P280, P302+P352, P304+P340, P305+P351+P338, P312, P321, P332+P313, P337+P313, P362, P403+P233, P405, P501

Related compounds
Other anions	Bismuth(III) oxide Bismuth selenide Bismuth telluride
Other cations	Arsenic trisulfide Antimony trisulfide
- Except where otherwise noted, data are given for materials in their standard state (at 25 °C [77 °F], 100 kPa). verify (what is ?) Infobox references

Bismuth(III) sulfide (Bi_{2}S_{3}) is a chemical compound of bismuth and sulfur. It occurs in nature as the mineral bismuthinite.

== Synthesis ==
Bismuth(III) sulfide can be prepared by reacting a bismuth(III) salt with hydrogen sulfide:

2 Bi^{3+} + 3 H_{2}S → Bi_{2}S_{3} + 6 H^{+}

Bismuth (III) sulfide can also be prepared by the reaction of elemental bismuth and elemental sulfur in an evacuated silica tube at 500 °C for 96 hours.

2 Bi + 3 S → Bi_{2}S_{3}

== Properties ==
Bismuth(III) sulfide is isostructural with stibnite (stibnite is one of the forms of antimony(III) sulfide). Bismuth atoms are in two different environments, both of which have 7 coordinate Bismuth atoms, 4 in a near planar rectangle and three more distant making an irregular 7-coordination group.

It can react with acids to produce the odoriferous hydrogen sulfide gas.

Bismuth(III) sulfide may be produced in the body by the reaction of the common gastrointestinal drug bismuth subsalicylate with naturally occurring sulfides; this causes temporary black tongue when the sulfides are in the mouth and black feces when the sulfides are in the colon.

== Uses ==
It is used as a starting material to produce many other bismuth compounds.
