= Bismutite =

Bismuth carbonate mineral

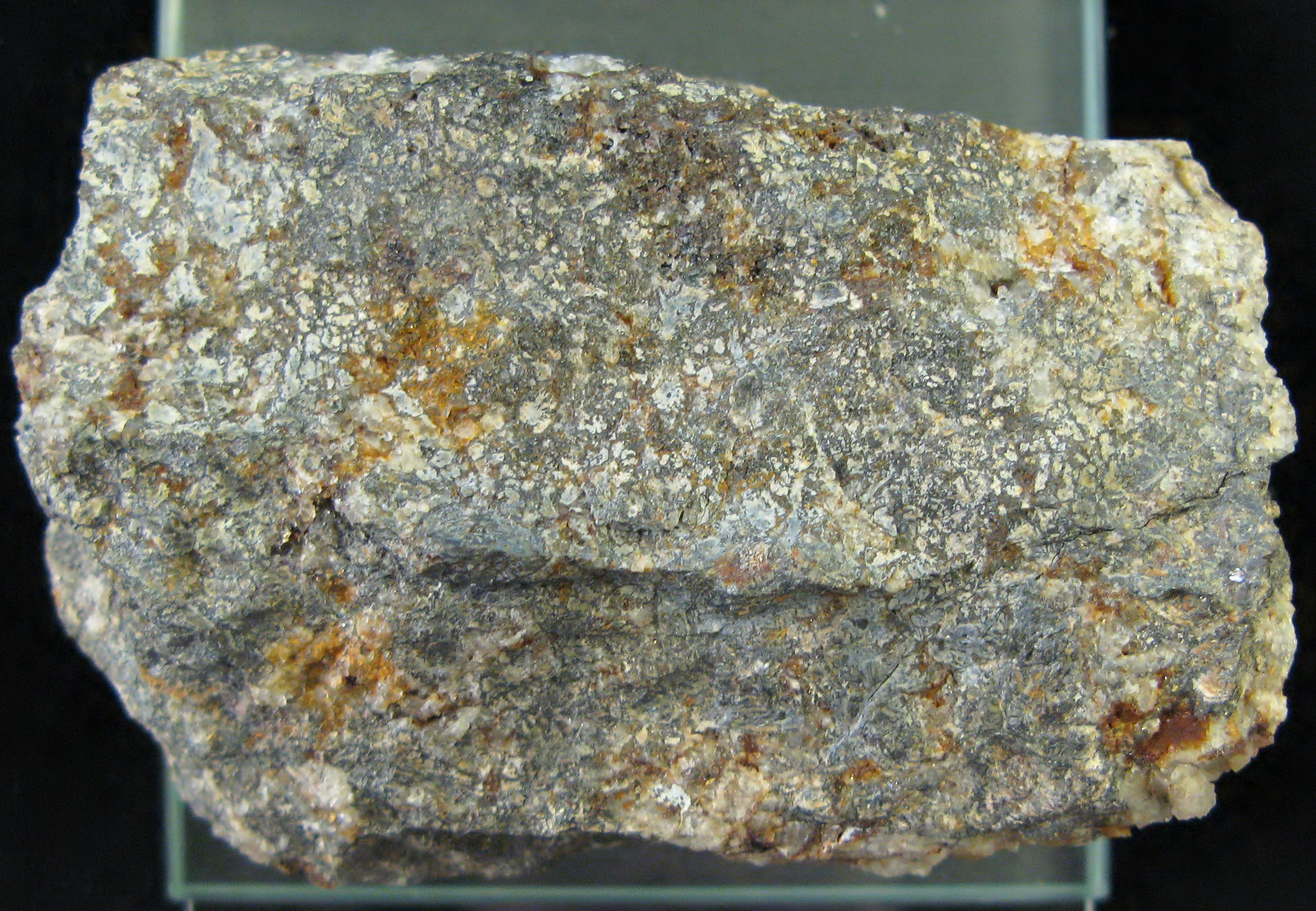
- Bismutite from Schneeberg, Germany

General
- Category: Carbonate mineral
- Formula: Bi_{2}(CO_{3})O_{2}
- IMA symbol: Bit
- Strunz classification: 5.BE.25
- Dana classification: 16a.03.05.01
- Crystal system: Orthorhombic
- Crystal class: Pyramidal (mm2) (same H-M symbol)
- Space group: Immm
- Unit cell: a = 3.865 Å, b = 3.862 Å, c = 13.675 Å; Z = 2

Identification
- Color: Yellow to brown, greenish, green-grey, grey or black
- Crystal habit: Very rare as platy crystals; typically radially fibrous to spheroidal, in crusts and earthy to dense massive aggregates
- Twinning: pseudo-merohedral twinning simulates tetragonal symmetry
- Cleavage: Distinct/Good on {001} (microscopically observable)
- Mohs scale hardness: 2.5 – 3.5
- Luster: Vitreous, waxy, may be dull to earthy
- Streak: Grey
- Diaphaneity: Opaque to transparent in small grains
- Specific gravity: 6.7 – 7.4 measured, 8.15 calculated
- Optical properties: Biaxial (−) (appears uniaxial due to twinning)
- Refractive index: a=2.12–2.15, b=2.12–2.15, g=2.28
- Birefringence: 0.1300–0.1600
- 2V angle: 45

Bismutite or bismuthite is a bismuth carbonate mineral with formula Bi_{2}(CO_{3})O_{2} (bismuth subcarbonate). Bismutite occurs as an oxidation product of other bismuth minerals such as bismuthinite and native bismuth in hydrothermal veins and pegmatites. It crystallizes in the orthorhombic system and typically occurs as earthy to fibrous masses.

It was first described in 1841 for an occurrence in Saxony.

The term bismuthite has been used in the past for bismuthinite.

== See also ==
- Bismuthinite
- Bismoclite
- Bismite
- Eulytine
- Zavaritskite
