= Höchstberg (Eifel) =

- Location within Rhineland-Palatinate

Highest point
- Elevation: 616.4 m above sea level (NHN)
- Coordinates: 50°14′16″N 7°02′20″E

Geography
- Location: Rhineland-Palatinate, Germany
- Parent range: Volcanic Eifel, Eifel Mountains

The Höchstberg is a mountain, 616.4 m, in the Volcanic Eifel region of the Eifel mountains, in the German state of Rhineland-Palatinate. It rises within the Elzbach Heights.

There is a basalt quarry on the mountain at a height of about 539 metres above sea level.

Three streams rise on the mountain: the Ahlsbach, the Eppertsbach and the Lessierbach.

Nearby is the eponymous village of Höchstberg.
