= Bismoclite =

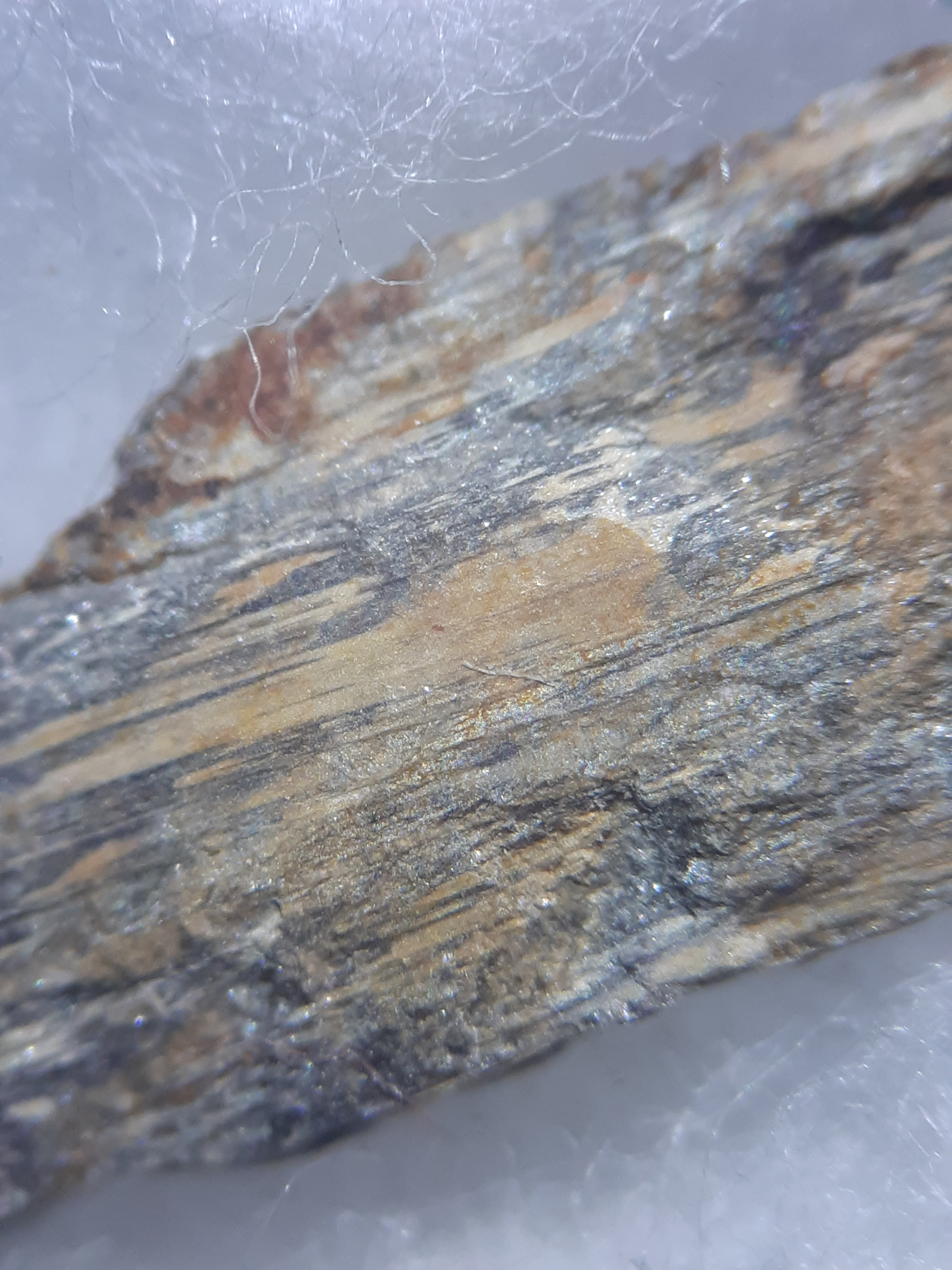
- Yellow-orange bismoclite interspersed with bismuthinite from the Alto do Giz pegmatite, Equador, Rio Grande do Norte, NE-region, Brazil. Approximate image width: 5 mm.

General
- Category: Halide mineral
- Formula: BiOCl
- IMA symbol: Bmc
- Strunz classification: 3.DC.25
- Dana classification: 10.2.1.2
- Crystal system: Tetragonal
- Crystal class: Ditetragonal dipyramidal (4/mmm); H-M symbol: (4/m 2/m 2/m)
- Space group: P4/nmm
- Unit cell: a = 3.887 Å, c = 7.354 Å; Z = 2

Identification
- Color: Cream-white, greyish, yellowish brown
- Crystal habit: Platey to thin rectangular crystals, fibrous to columnar, massive
- Cleavage: {001} perfect
- Tenacity: Elastic
- Mohs scale hardness: 2-2.5
- Luster: Greasy, silky, pearly, dull, earthy
- Streak: White
- Diaphaneity: Transparent to translucent
- Specific gravity: 7.36 (measured), 7.784 (calculated)
- Optical properties: Uniaxial (-)
- Refractive index: n_{ω} = 2.150 n_{ε} = 1.910
- Birefringence: δ = 0.240

Bismoclite is a bismuth oxohalide mineral with formula BiOCl. It is the naturally occurring form of bismuth oxychloride. The name was derived from its chemical constituents. It is a secondary bismuth mineral first thought to be composed of bismuthyl ions (BiO^{+}) and chloride anions, however, the existence of the diatomic bismuthyl ion is doubtful.

It is a member of the matlockite group.

It was first described in 1935 from alluvium near bismuth-bearing pegmatites in South Africa. It has been found in association with granite pegmatite and in greisen. Associated minerals include bismutite, mica, jarosite, alunite, cerussite, atacamite, connellite. Occurrences include the type locality at Jackals Water, SW of Prieska, South Africa; Bygoo, Australia; the Tintic district in the East Tintic Mountains of Utah; and from Dalbeattie, Scotland.

== Crystal structure ==
The crystal structure of bismoclite was found to be composed of linked decahedrons, specifically a square antiprism. These decahedrons consist of 2 squares with sides of 3.487 Å (O-O-O-O and Cl-Cl-Cl-Cl) connected by 8 isosceles triangles (O-Cl-O and Cl-O-Cl), with a bismuth atom at the centre. The Bi-O distances and Bi-Cl distances are 2.316 Å and 3.059 Å, respectively. The O-Cl distances in the triangles are 3.249 Å. The decahedrons are linked to each other through shared O-Cl sides.

== Practical significance ==
Bismoclite is a rare secondary mineral, a product of the oxidation of basic bismuth ores in the presence of active chlorine ions. In addition, bismoclite does not represent the final oxidation product. For example, during the oxidation of native bismuth under hypergenesis conditions, the intermediate product is bismuth chloride, and the final product is a sparingly soluble carbonate. For this reason, bismoclite is found in deposits of bismuthinite and native bismuth in much smaller volumes than the similar minerals bismite and bismuthinite, in which it is often present as an impurity. With the same success as these latter, it can be used to obtain bismuth and its compounds. However, the main significance of bismoclite is purely scientific, allowing more accurate monitoring and determination of geochemical processes in zones of oxidation and weathering of the main bismuth ores.

- In medical diagnostics, bismoclite (in the form of purified bismuth oxychloride) is used as a local radiocontrast agent.
- In addition, in the production of cosmetics, bismoclite is used as an enhancing agent; it gives a pearlescent shine to lipstick, nail polish and eye shadow.
- In the chemical industry, in the process of cracking hydrocarbons, bismuth oxochloride is used as a catalyst.
