= Dragon's egg =

Type of firework

A dragon's egg is a fireworks pyrotechnic star which first burns for a period for a visual effect and then loudly deflagrates. This effect became controversial because of the toxic compounds once used, particularly lead tetroxide Pb_{3}O_{4}.

Bismuth trioxide or bismuth subcarbonate are commonly used as more environmentally friendly substitutes for lead compounds to achieve the effect, and its occurrence in fireworks displays has since become much more common.

Because of how heavy an individual bismuth atom is, a shell or cake containing mainly dragon's eggs (and therefore enriched in bismuth) is often noticeably heavier than a similar device containing other effects.

== History ==
The dragon's egg firework was created in the late 20th century, compared to other fireworks that date back to ancient China. The original design was made with lead tetroxide. This chemical is very sensitive both to friction and impact. This makes the compound highly explosive. Lead tetroxide also is extremely toxic and can have some serious health effects. If lead tetroxide is inhaled, it can make it hard to breathe, and cause chest pain. If ingested, it can lead to lead poisoning, neurological damage, and in extreme cases even death.

Once the effects of lead tetroxide were discovered, the dragon's egg firework was then created using bismuth trioxide (Bi_{2}O_{3}). Bismuth trioxide is commonly used as a non-toxic substitute to lead compounds in pyrotechnics.
