= Scintillating bolometer =

Detector for low-energy particles

A scintillating bolometer (or luminescent bolometer) is a scientific instrument using particle physics in the search for events with low energy deposition. These events could include dark matter, low energy solar neutrinos, double beta decay or rare radioactive decay. It works by simultaneously measuring both the light pulse and heat pulse generated by a particle interaction within its internal scintillator crystal. The device was originally proposed by L. Gonzalez-Mestres and D. Perret-Gallix (LAPP, IN2P3/CNRS)

In their rapporteur contribution to the Proceedings of the XXIV International Conference on High-Energy Physics, Munich, August 1988, Gonzalez-Mestres and Perret-Gallix wrote :

Perhaps bolometry should in some cases be combined with other detection techniques (luminescence?) in order to produce a primary fast signal as timing strobe. If light is used as a complementary signature, particle identification can be achieved through the heat-light ratio, where nucleus recoil is expected to be less luminescent than ionizing particles. The success of such a development would open the way to unprecedented achievements in background rejection for rare event experiments.

Further explanations, including a description of the detector and possible applications incorporating in particular BGO and tungstates, were given by these authors in other papers such as their contribution to the March 1989 Moriond Meeting (pages 16–18).

The luminescent bolometer has since then been developed by scientists from several groups, including the CNRS Institut d'Astrophysique Spatiale and University of Zaragoza collaboration in view of the proposed ROSEBUD particle detector experiment in the Canfranc Underground Laboratory. Rosebud uses a bismuth germanate (Bi_{4}Ge_{3}O_{12}, "BGO") detector crystal.

The CRESST collaboration is currently using the same kind of device with CaWO_{4} crystals in an experiment to detect dark matter at Laboratori Nazionali del Gran Sasso.
