= Cake (firework) =

Type of firework

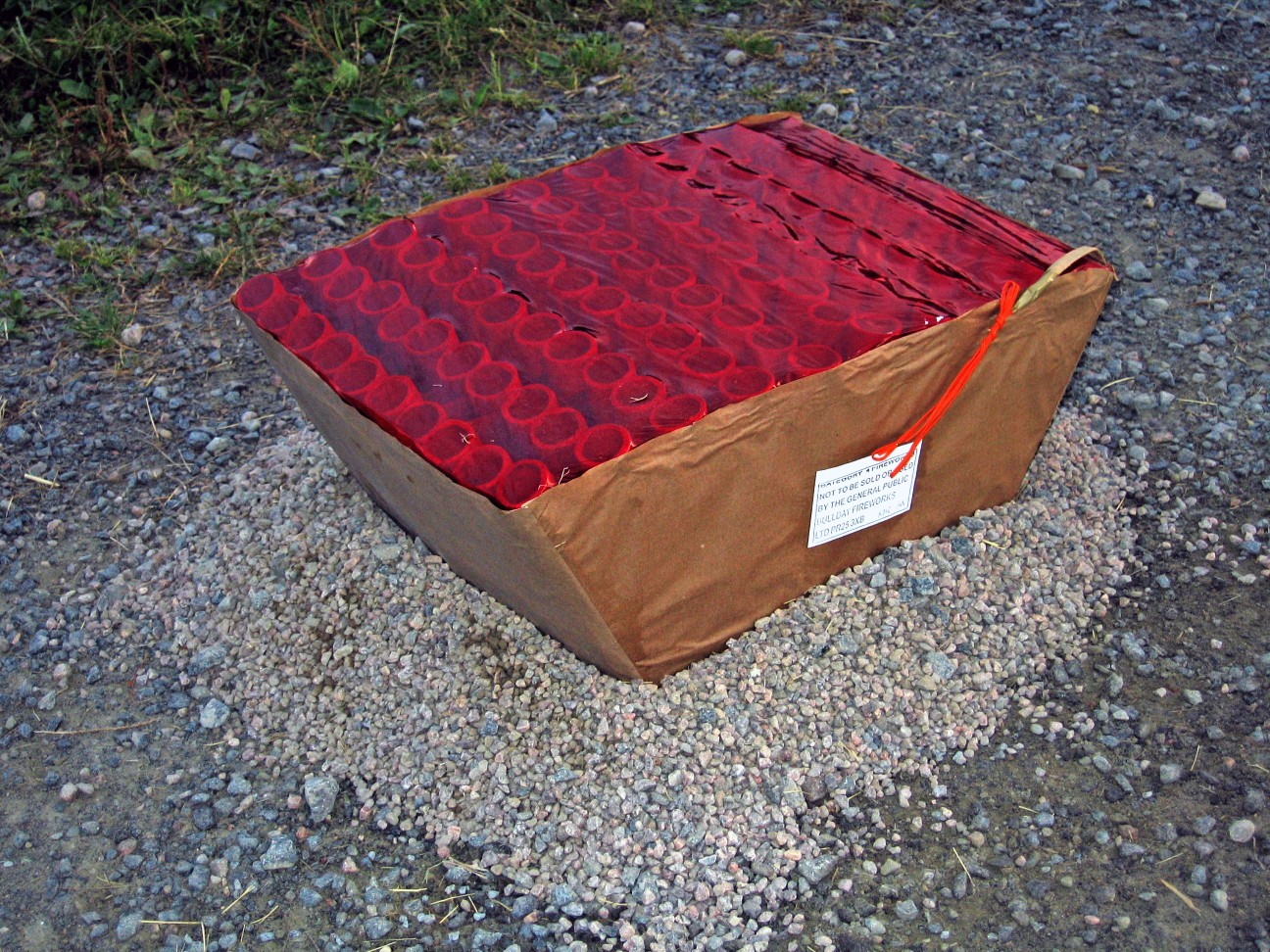
A 100-shot fan cake

A cake firework, also known as a multiple tube device, is a firework comprising a series of Roman candles, small aerial shells, or a combination of both, connected together by a high-speed fuse. Typically, the internal fusing is set to fire each tube in series, or to fire several tubes at the same time, or a combination of these. Typically a cake will resemble from the outside a simple cube or other rectangular covered shape; after firing, a large number of cardboard tubes (the candles) will be visible in the top of the firework (the paper cover having been blown off by the discharging stars). In a traditional cake, all the candles point upwards; a variant is called the fan or angle cake.

Cakes are one of the most popular types of firework, as they can create spectacular and long-lasting effects from a single ignition while minimising safety concern. In the UK, the reclassification of aerial shells to Category 4 has popularised cakes as a method for achieving similar effects while staying within safety guidelines, particularly by firing multiple candles at the same time.

Cakes vary greatly in size, weight and duration. Some last only a few seconds and contain only a few tubes, while others may last for several minutes, contain upwards of 1,000 tubes, and measure over 1 cubic yard (760 L) in size. Large "finale Cakes" containing dozens of shells up to 4 inches (10 cm)-diameter are not uncommon, and some cakes, particularly those containing large amounts of dragon's eggs, can weigh over 100 pounds (45 kg) prior to discharge.

== See also ==
- Multiple rocket launcher – Rocket artillery system with multiple launchers
