= Bismuth hydroxide =

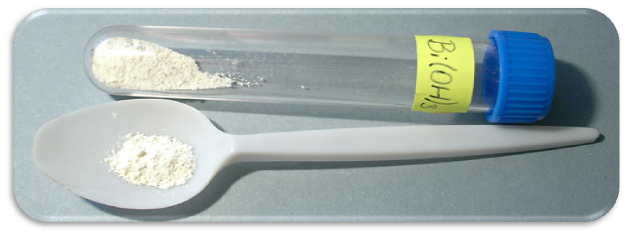

Names
- Other names: Bismuth oxide hydrate; Bismuth hydrate

Identifiers
CAS Number	10361-43-0
3D model (JSmol)	Interactive image
ChemSpider	8013784
ECHA InfoCard	100.030.706
EC Number	233-790-2
PubChem CID	9838064
UNII	B1818YPL67
CompTox Dashboard (EPA)	DTXSID1065053
- InChI: InChI=1S/Bi.3H2O/h;3*1H2/q+3;;;/p-3 Key: TZSXPYWRDWEXHG-UHFFFAOYSA-K
- SMILES: [OH-].[OH-].[OH-].[Bi+3]

Properties
Chemical formula	BiH_{3}O_{3}
Molar mass	260.001 g·mol^{−1}
Appearance	yellowish-white powder
Density	4.96 g/cm^{3}
Solubility in water	insoluble

Hazards
- GHS labelling
Pictograms	(GHS07: Exclamation mark)
Signal word	Warning
Hazard statements	H302, H315, H319, H335, H413
Precautionary statements	P261, P264, P270, P271, P273, P280, P301+P312, P302+P352, P304+P340, P305+P351+P338, P312, P321, P330, P332+P313, P337+P313, P362, P403+P233, P405, P501

Related compounds
Other cations	Boric acid; Scandium(III) hydroxide
- Except where otherwise noted, data are given for materials in their standard state (at 25 °C [77 °F], 100 kPa). Infobox references

Bismuth hydroxide (Bi(OH)_{3}) is a non-fully characterised chemical compound of bismuth. It is produced as white flakes when alkali is added to a solution of a bismuth salt and is usually described as bismuth oxide hydrate or bismuth hydrate. Upon heating to 400°C, bismuth hydroxide decomposes to bismuth(III) oxide.

== Uses ==
Bismuth hydrate is a component used in milk of bismuth which is used in gastrointestinal disorders as a protective agent. Aqueous ammonia reacts with bismuth(III) ions to precipitate white bismuth hydroxide.

It is used as an absorbent, and in the hydrolysis of ribonucleic acid. It is also used in the isolation of plutonium from irradiated uranium.
