= Sillénite =

Oxide mineral of bismuth and silicon

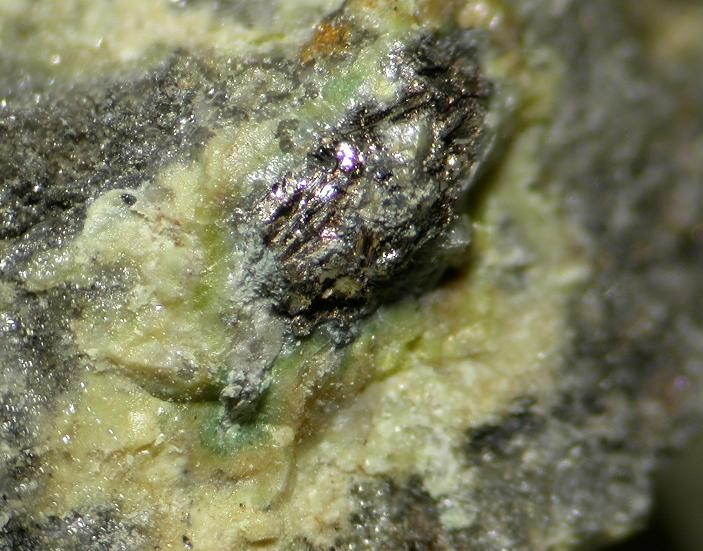
- Sillénite from Germany

General
- Category: Oxide mineral
- Formula: Bi_{12}SiO_{20}
- IMA symbol: Sén
- Strunz classification: 4.CB.70
- Dana classification: 16a.03.05.01
- Crystal system: Cubic
- Crystal class: Tetartoidal (23); H-M symbol: (23)
- Space group: I23
- Unit cell: a = 10.110 Å, Z = 2

Identification
- Color: Olive-green, gray-green, yellow-green, yellow, reddish-brown
- Crystal habit: Cubic crystals
- Mohs scale hardness: 1–2
- Luster: Adamantine
- Diaphaneity: Translucent
- Specific gravity: 9.16
- Optical properties: Isotropic
- Refractive index: >2.5
- Birefringence: none
- Solubility: Soluble in hydrochloric acid

Sillénite or sillenite is a mineral with the chemical formula Bi_{12}SiO_{20}. It is named after the Swedish chemist Lars Gunnar Sillén, who mostly studied bismuth-oxygen compounds. It is found in Australia, Europe, China, Japan, Mexico and Mozambique, typically in association with bismutite.

Sillenites refer to a class of bismuth compounds with a structure similar to Bi_{12}SiO_{20}, whose parent structure is γ-Bi_{2}O_{3}, a meta-stable form of bismuth oxide. The cubic crystal sillenite structure is shared by several synthetic materials including bismuth titanate and bismuth germanate. These compounds have been extensively investigated for their non-linear optical properties.

Additional stoichiometries, and modified structures, are also found in Bi_{25}GaO_{39}, Bi_{25}FeO_{39}, and Bi_{25}InO_{39}. These compounds have gathered recent interest due to their photocatalytic properties.

Recently, sillenites have also gathered interest as heavy metal glass ceramics. They are considered promising materials for laser technology as they combine strong nonlinear properties, relative ease of manufacturing, and low production cost.
