= Höchstberg =

- Municipality
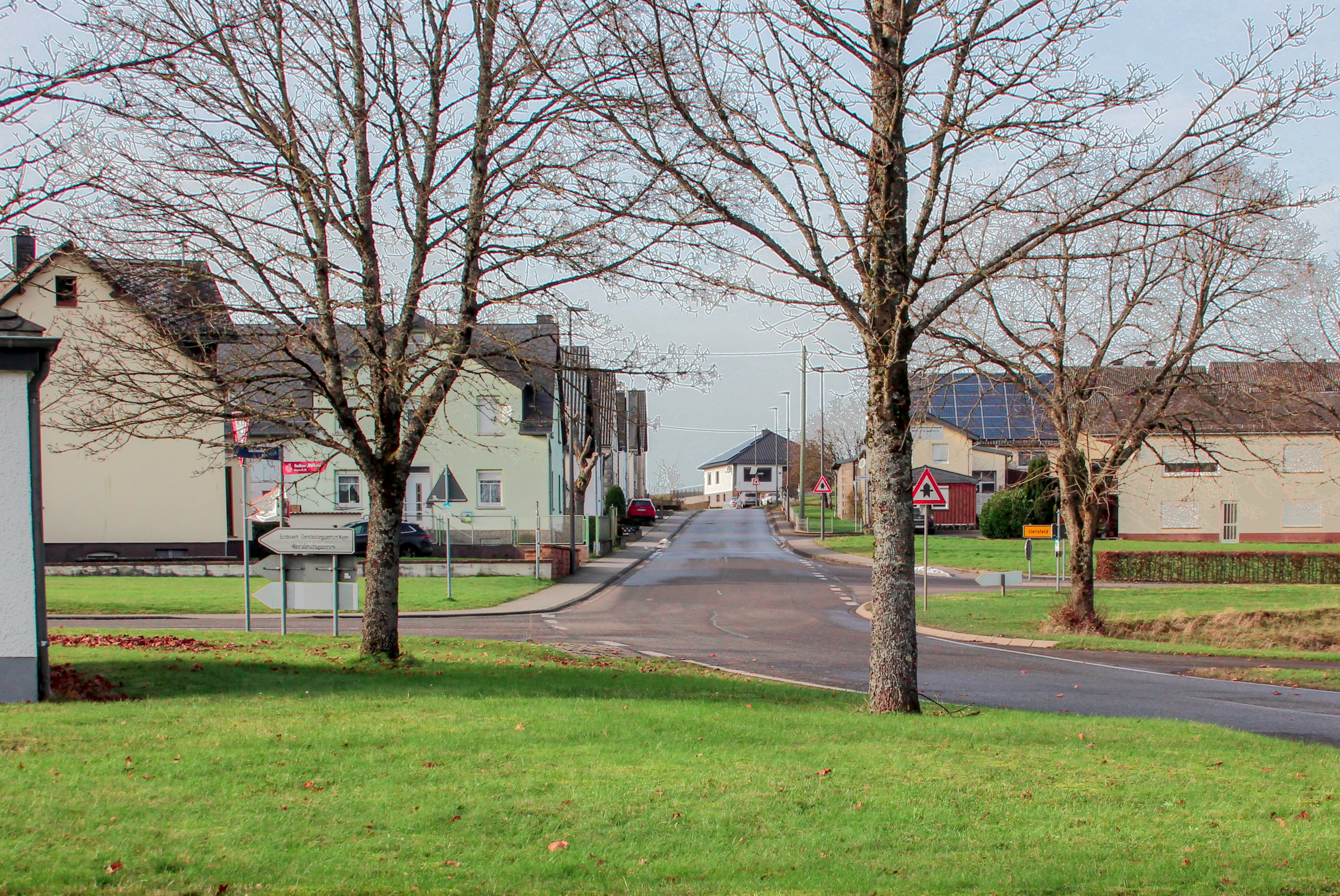

- Coat of arms

- Location of Höchstberg within Vulkaneifel district
- Interactive map of Höchstberg
- Location within Germany Location within Rhineland-Palatinate
- Coordinates: 50°14′35″N 7°0′24″E
- Country: Germany
- State: Rhineland-Palatinate
- District: Vulkaneifel
- Municipal assoc.: Kelberg

Government
  - Mayor (2019–24): Berthold Karst

Area
  - Total: 4.85 km^{2} (1.87 sq mi)
- Elevation: 516 m (1,693 ft)

Population (2025-12-31)
  - Total: 335
  - Density: 69.1/km^{2} (179/sq mi)
- Time zone: UTC+01:00 (CET)
  - Summer (DST): UTC+02:00 (CEST)
- Postal codes: 56767
- Dialling codes: 02657
- Vehicle registration: DAU
- Website: www.hoechstberg-eifel.de

Höchstberg is an Ortsgemeinde – a municipality belonging to a Verbandsgemeinde, a kind of collective municipality – in the Vulkaneifel district in Rhineland-Palatinate, Germany. It belongs to the Verbandsgemeinde of Kelberg, whose seat is in the like-named municipality.

== Geography ==
=== Location ===
The municipality lies in the Vulkaneifel, a part of the Eifel known for its volcanic history, geographical and geological features, and even ongoing activity today, including gases that sometimes well up from the earth. Nearby is the mountain of the same name, the Höchstberg.

=== Climate ===
Yearly precipitation in Höchstberg amounts to 799 mm, falling into the middle third of the precipitation chart for all Germany. At 0% of the German Weather Service's weather stations, lower figures are recorded. The driest month is April. The most rainfall comes in November. In that month, precipitation is 1.4 times what it is in April. Precipitation varies only slightly. At none of the weather stations are lower seasonal swings recorded.

== History ==
Barrows and the remnants of a Roman farm lead to the conclusion that people settled the area as early as the 2nd century. Höchstberg's first documentary mention, though, only goes back as far as 1389. The document's content is merely a lease in which Tilgin von Daun leased the estate in Husen bei Uersfeld to the Burgmann and administrator Peter von Nürburg.

The occasion for the documentary mention in 1620 was a sensational murder trial: local peasants were accused of having assassinated Spanish riders who were travelling through the area and having robbed them. The peasants were later either hanged or broken on the wheel. If the documents from that time are being read correctly, it is clear that the peasants were simply victims of a show trial: What may have been the justifiable killing of Spaniards in view of the times stood in connection with the Thirty Years' War as a political scandal, and the peasants who were sentenced to death were proverbial "pawns" in the game of ensuring the political intrigues in the Empire.

Within the framework of the French Revolution, the Rhineland became the “Frankish Republic”, and encamped in the Kelberg area in 1794 was a French corps (roughly 10,000 men) for whose supplies the surrounding municipalities had to pay. Höchstberg at this time was home to 69 inhabitants.

French influence ebbed in 1815 with the Congress of Vienna: The Rhineland became Prussian. In connection with the building of the Eifelquerbahn (“Cross-Eifel Railway”) from Mayen to Gerolstein and baryte mining, there was an economic upswing in the early 20th century.

In 1934, Höchstberg was given its current name. The old name, Hausen, could have been confused with another place named Hausen, one of Mayen's outlying centres.

== Politics ==
=== Municipal council ===
The council is made up of 8 council members, who were elected by majority vote at the municipal election held on 7 June 2009, and the honorary mayor as chairman.

=== Mayor ===
Höchstberg's mayor is Berthold Karst.

=== Coat of arms ===
The German blazon reads: Von Silber über Schwarz geteilt, oben ein schwarzes Balkenkreuz, unten rechts ein silbern gefasstes, rotes Buch mit goldenem Kreuz, links eine weiße Feder.

The municipality's arms might in English heraldic language be described thus: Per fess argent a cross sable and sable dexter a book gules garnished of the first and leaved Or, charged with a cross humetty of the same, and sinister a feather bendwise sinister of the first.

Until the end of feudal times, Gunderath was an Electoral-Cologne holding, and the Cross of Cologne in the upper half of the escutcheon recalls this time. The book and the quill are Mark the Evangelist’s attributes, thus representing the municipality's and the church's patron saint.

The arms have been borne since 1988.

== Culture and sightseeing ==
=== Associations ===
Höchstberg has many associations: shooting club, youth social club, amateur football team, Höchstberg Volunteer Fire Brigade. The village festival is held in late August every year.

=== Buildings ===
- Saint Mark's Catholic Church (Kirche St. Markus), Hauptstraße 8, four-axis aisleless church, about 1950/1960.
- Hauptstraße 17 – timber-frame house, part of an estate complex, partly solid, partly slated, possibly from about 1800.
- Hauptstraße 42 – former school, partly basalt quarrystone, partly timber-frame, partly slated, from 1910.
- Uersfeld railway station, Am Bahnhof 3, plaster building, waiting hall a quarrystone building, apparently from 1906.
