= Bismuth subcarbonate =

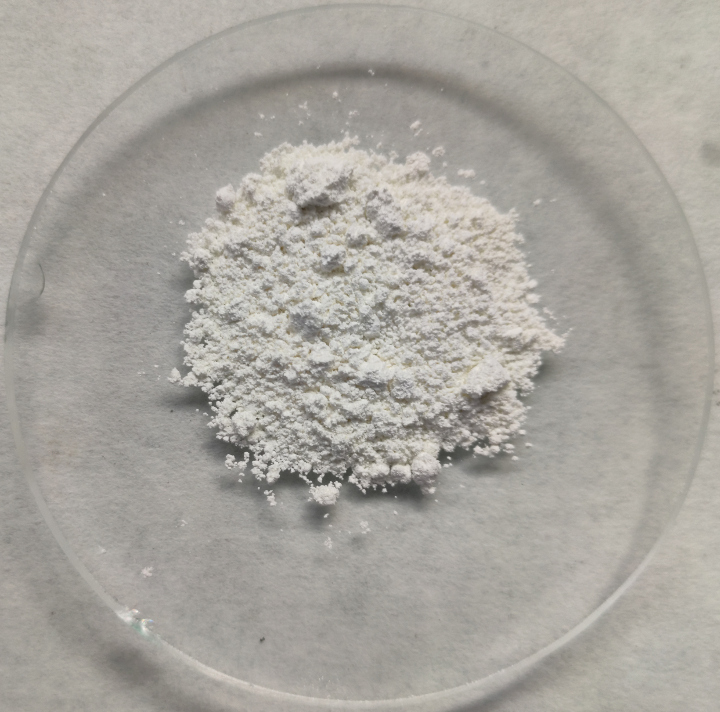

Names
- Other names bismuth oxycarbonate, bismuthyl carbonate, bismutite

Identifiers
CAS Number	5892-10-4
3D model (JSmol)	Interactive image
ChEBI	CHEBI:31291
ChemSpider	17615654
DrugBank	DB11281
ECHA InfoCard	100.025.061
EC Number	227-567-9
Gmelin Reference	1473121
KEGG	D01757
PubChem CID	16683095
UNII	M41L2IN55T
CompTox Dashboard (EPA)	DTXSID5046518
- InChI: InChI=1S/CH2O3.2Bi.2O/c2-1(3)4;;;;/h(H2,2,3,4);;;;/q;2*+1;;/p-2 Key: MGLUJXPJRXTKJM-UHFFFAOYSA-L
- SMILES: [Bi+]=O.[Bi+]=O.O=C([O-])[O-]

Properties
Chemical formula	(BiO)_{2}(CO_{3})
Molar mass	509.9685 g/mol
Appearance	fine white to pale yellow-white powder
Density	6.86 g/cm^{3}
Boiling point	decomposes
Solubility in water	insoluble

Hazards
NFPA 704 (fire diamond)	1 0 0
- Except where otherwise noted, data are given for materials in their standard state (at 25 °C [77 °F], 100 kPa). verify (what is ?) Infobox references

Bismuth subcarbonate (BiO)_{2}CO_{3}, sometimes written Bi_{2}O_{2}(CO_{3}) is a chemical compound of bismuth containing both oxide and carbonate anions. Bismuth is in the +3 oxidation state. Bismuth subcarbonate occurs naturally as the mineral bismutite. Its structure consists of Bi–O layers and CO_{3} layers and is related to kettnerite, CaBi(CO_{3})OF. It is light-sensitive.

== Uses ==
It is highly radiopaque and for example is used as a filler in radiopaque catheters which can be seen by x-ray. In modern medicine, bismuth subcarbonate has been made into nanotube arrays that exhibit antibacterial properties. It is also used in fireworks to make Dragon's eggs. It is a constituent of milk of bismuth which was a popular digestive tract panacea in the 1930s.

== Safety ==
Bismuth subcarbonate may be harmful if swallowed. It may irritate the respiratory and gastrointestinal tract.

== Synthesis ==
Bismuth subcarbonate can be attained from the reaction between bismuth nanoparticles and the atmospheric carbon dioxide (CO_{2}) dissolved in water. Bismuth subcarbonate has the tendency to form nanoplates, but it can be also obtained as small round nanospheres (with controlled size) when it is grown in the presence of halloysite nanotubes. The high pH and high temperature of the aqueous solution helps to reduce the time of synthesis. It is readily formed on the surface of undoped bismuth oxide (β-Bi_{2}O_{3} and γ-Bi_{2}O_{3}) nanoparticles even when they are not suspended in water.

== Structure ==
Bismuth subcarbonate has a structure with a tetragonal unit cell. Layers of (BiO)_{n} positively charged, and carbonate anion (CO^{2−}_{3}) are surrounding both sides of the (BiO)^{+}_{n} layer to compensate the charge. Usually, the (BiO)_{n} layer grows perpendicular to the b axis.
