= Bismuth(III) oxide =

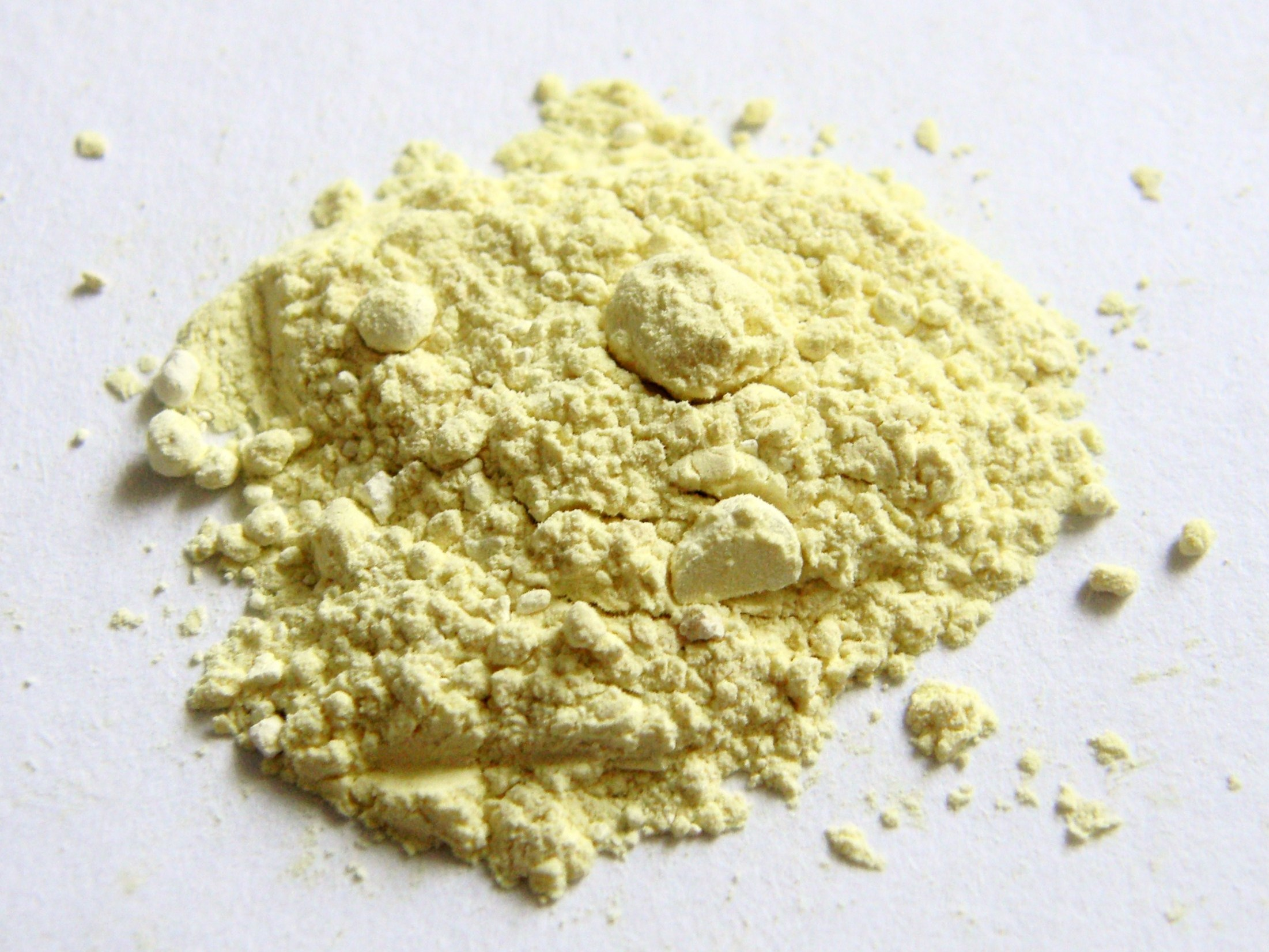
- Bismuth trioxide

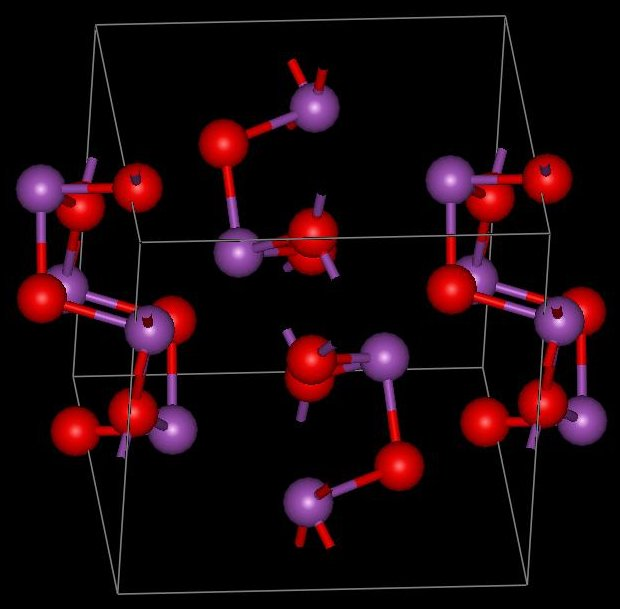

Names
- IUPAC names Bismuth trioxide Bismuth(III) oxide Bismite (mineral)
- Other names Bismuth oxide, bismuth sesquioxide

Identifiers
CAS Number	1304-76-3
3D model (JSmol)	Interactive image
ChemSpider	14093
ECHA InfoCard	100.013.759
EC Number	215-134-7
PubChem CID	14776
UNII	A6I4E79QF1
CompTox Dashboard (EPA)	DTXSID8046537
- InChI: InChI=1S/2Bi.3O Key: WMWLMWRWZQELOS-UHFFFAOYSA-N; InChI=1/2Bi.3O/rBi2O3/c3-1-5-2-4 Key: WMWLMWRWZQELOS-JOBWJGIYAA
- SMILES: O=[Bi]O[Bi]=O

Properties
Chemical formula	Bi_{2}O_{3}
Molar mass	465.958 g·mol^{−1}
Appearance	yellow crystals or powder
Odor	odorless
Density	8.90 g/cm^{3}, solid
Melting point	817 °C (1,503 °F; 1,090 K)
Boiling point	1,890 °C (3,430 °F; 2,160 K)
Solubility in water	insoluble
Solubility	soluble in acids
Magnetic susceptibility (χ)	−83.0·10^{−6} cm^{3}/mol

Structure
Crystal structure	monoclinic, mP20
Space group	P21/c (n° 14)
Lattice constant	a = 816.6 pm, b = 1382.7 pm, c = 585.0 pm α = 90°, β = 90.00°, γ = 90°
Lattice volume (V)	0.66053 nm^{3}
Formula units (Z)	8 formula per cell
Coordination geometry	pseudo-octahedral

Thermochemistry
Heat capacity (C)	113.5 J/(mol K)
Std molar entropy (S^{⦵}_{298})	151.5 J/(mol K)
Std enthalpy of formation (Δ_{f}H^{⦵}_{298})	-573.9 kJ/mol

Hazards
NFPA 704 (fire diamond)	1 0 0
Flash point	Non-flammable
Safety data sheet (SDS)	ThermoFisher SDS

Related compounds
Other anions	Bismuth trisulfide Bismuth selenide Bismuth telluride
Other cations	Dinitrogen trioxide Phosphorus trioxide Arsenic trioxide Antimony trioxide

Supplementary data page
- Bismuth(III) oxide (data page)
- Except where otherwise noted, data are given for materials in their standard state (at 25 °C [77 °F], 100 kPa). verify (what is ?) Infobox references

Bismuth(III) oxide is a compound of bismuth, with the chemical formula Bi_{2}O_{3}. It has seen extensive study for its ionic conductivity, but its most mature use is as a colorant in pyrotechnics.

== Allotropes and preparation ==
Existence domains of the four polymorphs of Bi_{2}O_{3} as a function of temperature. (a) The α-phase transforms to the δ-phase when heated above 727 °C, which remains the structure until the melting point, 824 °C, is reached. When cooled, the δ-phase transforms into either the β-phase at 650 °C, shown in (b), or the γ-phase at 639 °C, shown in (c). The β-phase transforms to the α-phase at 303 °C. The γ-phase may persist to room temperature when the cooling rate is very slow, otherwise it transforms to the α-phase at 500 °C.

Bismuth trioxide has five crystallographic polymorphs. The room temperature phase, α-Bi_{2}O_{3} has a monoclinic crystal structure. There are three high temperature phases, a tetragonal β-phase, a body-centred cubic γ-phase, a cubic δ-Bi_{2}O_{3} phase and an ε-phase.

The monoclinic α-phase transforms to the cubic δ-Bi_{2}O_{3} when heated above 729 °C, which remains the structure until the melting point, 824 °C, is reached. The behaviour of Bi_{2}O_{3} on cooling from the δ-phase is more complex, with the possible formation of two intermediate metastable phases; the tetragonal β-phase or the body-centred cubic γ-phase. The γ-phase can exist at room temperature with very slow cooling rates, but α-Bi_{2}O_{3} always forms on cooling the β-phase.

Some polymorphs are found naturally, but the material is usually obtained as a by-product of the smelting of copper and lead ores. In the laboratory, bismuth trioxide can be prepared by ignition of bismuth hydroxide. Also, it can be obtained by heating bismuth subcarbonate at approximately 400 °C.

=== α phase ===
The α phase is found naturally as the mineral bismite. It has a complex structure with layers of oxygen atoms with layers of bismuth atoms between them. The bismuth atoms are in two different environments which can be described as distorted 6 and 5 coordinate respectively.

=== β phase ===
β-Bi_{2}O_{3} has a structure related to fluorite. As a mineral, it is known as sphaerobismoite and is much rarer than bismite.

=== γ phase ===
γ-Bi_{2}O_{3} has a structure related to that of sillenite (Bi_{12}SiO_{20}), but replacing the silicon with more bismuth and corresponding oxygen vacancies. The crystals are chiral (space group I23, or no. 197) with two Bi_{12}Bi_{0.8}O_{19.2} formulas per unit cell.

=== δ phase ===
δ-Bi_{2}O_{3} has a defective fluorite-type crystal structure in which two of the eight oxygen sites in the unit cell are vacant.

The arrangement of oxygen atoms within the unit cell of δ-Bi_{2}O_{3} has been the subject of much debate in the past. Three different models have been proposed:

- Sillén (1937) used powder X-ray diffraction on quenched samples and reported the structure of Bi_{2}O_{3} was a simple cubic phase with oxygen vacancies ordered along <111>, the cube body diagonal.
- Gattow and Schroder (1962) rejected this model, preferring to describe each oxygen site (8c site) in the unit cell as having 75% occupancy. In other words, the six oxygen atoms are randomly distributed over the eight possible oxygen sites in the unit cell. Currently, most experts seem to favour the latter description as a completely disordered oxygen sub-lattice accounts for the high conductivity in a better way.
- Willis (1965) used neutron diffraction to study the fluorite (CaF_{2}) system. He determined that it could not be described by the ideal fluorite crystal structure, rather, the fluorine atoms were displaced from regular 8c positions towards the centres of the interstitial positions. Shuk et al. (1996) and Sammes et al. (1999) suggest that because of the high degree of disorder in δ-Bi_{2}O_{3}, the Willis model could also be used to describe its structure.

δ-Bi_{2}O_{3} can be formed directly through electrodeposition and remain relatively stable at room temperature, in an electrolyte of bismuth compounds that is also rich in sodium or potassium hydroxide so as to have a pH near 14.

=== ε phase ===
ε-Bi_{2}O_{3} has a structure related to the α- and β- phases but as the structure is fully ordered it is an ionic insulator. It can be prepared by hydrothermal means and transforms to the α-phase at 400 °C.

== Conductivity ==
The α-phase exhibits p-type electronic conductivity (the charge is carried by positive holes) at room temperature which transforms to n-type conductivity (charge is carried by electrons) between 550 °C and 650 °C, depending on the oxygen partial pressure. The conductivity in the β, γ and δ-phases is predominantly ionic with oxide ions or vacancies being the main charge carrier.

Of these δ-Bi_{2}O_{3} has the highest reported conductivity. The intrinsic vacancies in δ-Bi_{2}O_{3} are highly mobile due to the high polarisability of the cation sub-lattice with the 6s^{2} lone pair electrons of Bi^{3+}. The Bi–O bonds have covalent bond character and are therefore weaker than purely ionic bonds, so the oxygen ions can jump into vacancies more freely. At 750 °C the conductivity of δ-Bi_{2}O_{3} is typically about 1 S cm^{−1}, about three orders of magnitude greater than the intermediate phases and four orders greater than the monoclinic phase.

== Reactions ==
Atmospheric carbon dioxide or CO_{2} dissolved in water readily reacts with Bi_{2}O_{3} to generate bismuth subcarbonate. Bismuth oxide is considered a basic oxide, which explains the high reactivity with CO_{2}. However, when acidic cations such as Si(IV) are introduced within the structure of the bismuth oxide, the reaction with CO_{2} do not occur.

Bismuth(III) oxide reacts with a mixture of concentrated aqueous sodium hydroxide and bromine or aqueous potassium hydroxide and bromine to form sodium bismuthate or potassium bismuthate, respectively.

Dissolution of bismuth(III) oxide in aqueous acids gives [Bi_{6}O_{4}(OH)_{4}]^{6+} and [Bi(H_{2}O)_{9}]^{3+}.

== Uses ==
=== Pyrotechnics ===
Dibismuth trioxide is commonly used to produce the "Dragon's eggs" effect in fireworks, replacing red lead.

=== Medical devices ===
Bismuth oxide is occasionally used in dental cements to produce bone-like X-ray opacity, as a component of mineral trioxide aggregate. However, bismuth oxide is believed to contribute the gradual discoloration of the material under oxidative conditions similar to those produced by toothpaste.

=== Radiative cooling ===
Bismuth oxide was used to develop a scalable colored surface high in solar reflectance and heat emissivity for passive radiative cooling. The paint was non-toxic and demonstrated a reflectance of 99% and emittance of 97%. In field tests the coating exhibited significant cooling power and reflected potential for the further development of colored surfaces practical for large-scale radiative cooling applications.

=== Solid-oxide fuel cells ===
As δ-Bi_{2}O_{3} is oxide-conductive, it has been proposed for use in solid-oxide fuel cells, and studies have attempted to stabilize it for room temperature conditions.

Bi_{2}O_{3} has also been used as sintering additive in the Sc_{2}O_{3}-doped zirconia system for intermediate-temperature fuel cells.
