= Bismuthinite =

Bismuth (III) sulfide mineral

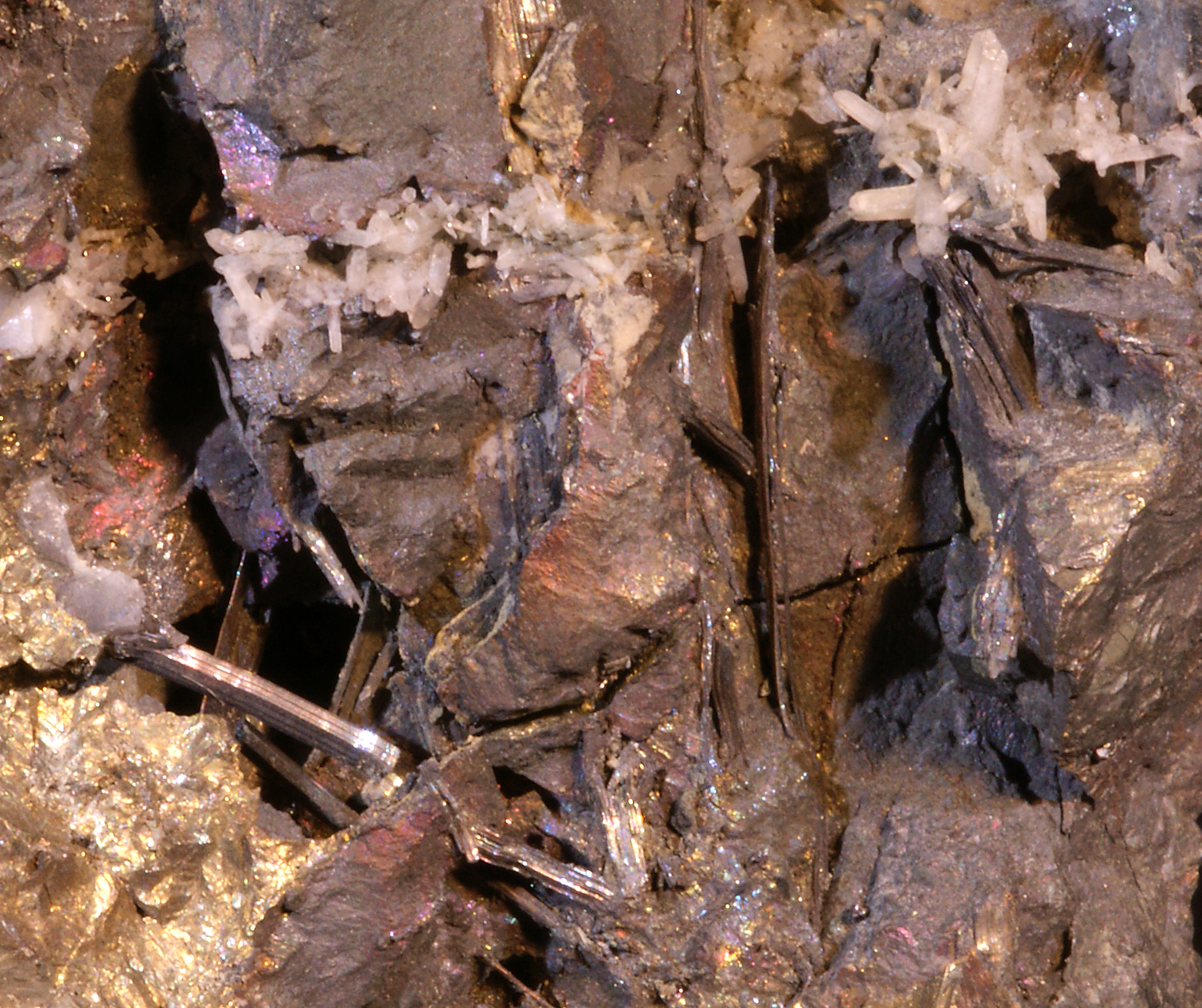
- Bismuthinite – Schlaggenwald (Horni Slavkov) – Bohemia – Czech Republic (XX 1.1 cm)

General
- Category: Sulfide mineral
- Formula: Bi_{2}S_{3}
- IMA symbol: Bin
- Strunz classification: 2.DB.05a
- Crystal system: Orthorhombic
- Crystal class: Dipyramidal (mmm); H-M symbol: (2/m 2/m 2/m)
- Space group: Pbnm

Identification
- Color: Lead-gray to tin-white, with a yellowish or iridescent tarnish.
- Crystal habit: Slender prismatic to acicular, massive lamellar
- Cleavage: [010] Perfect
- Fracture: Uneven
- Tenacity: Brittle, sectile
- Mohs scale hardness: 2
- Luster: Metallic
- Streak: Lead grey
- Specific gravity: 6.8–7.2
- Optical properties: Opaque

Bismuthinite is a mineral consisting of bismuth sulfide (Bi_{2}S_{3}). It is an important ore for bismuth. The crystals are steel-grey to off-white with a metallic luster. It is soft enough to be scratched with a fingernail and rather dense.

Bismuthinite forms a series with the lead, copper, bismuth mineral aikinite (PbCuBiS_{3}).

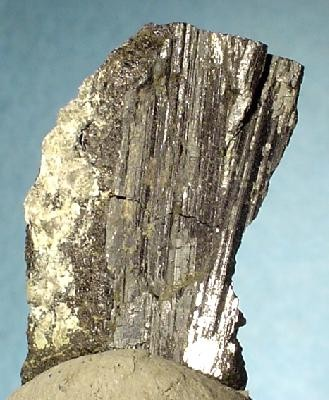
Bismuthinite crystal group from Bolivia (size: 2.9 × 1.9 × 1.5 cm)

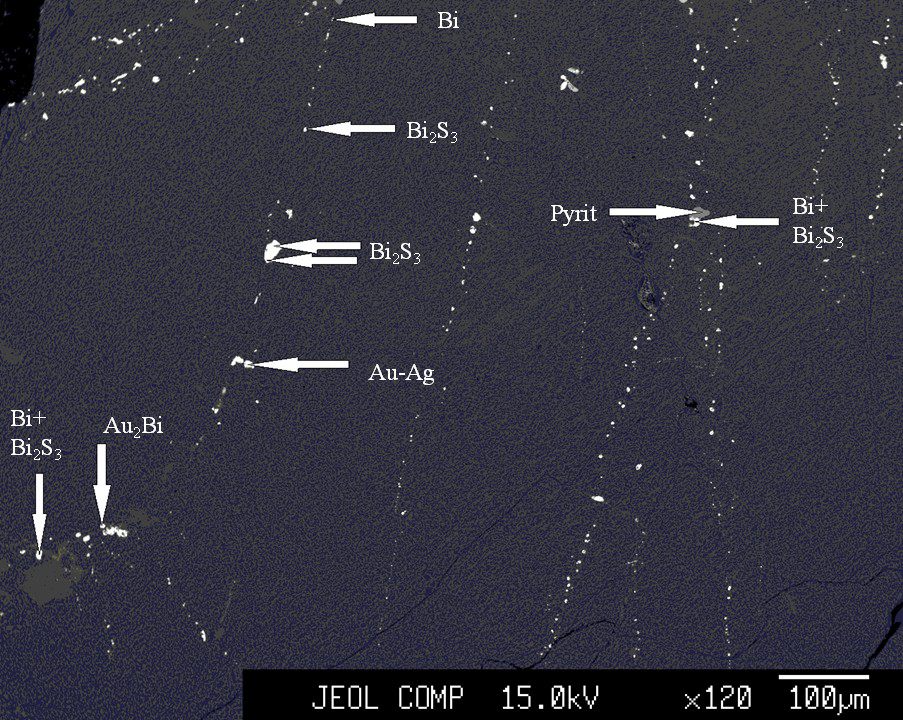
This microprobe scan of a quartz-rich gold ore from the Ädelfors Goldmine shows the orientation of bismuthinite and various other phases, mostly maldonite, along trails, probably former cracks

It occurs in hydrothermal veins with tourmaline-bearing copper veins associated with granite, in some high temperature gold veins, and in recent volcanic exhalation deposits. Associated minerals include native bismuth, aikinite, arsenopyrite, stannite, galena, pyrite, chalcopyrite, tourmaline, wolframite, cassiterite and quartz.

It was first reported in 1832 from the mines of Potosí, Bolivia.
