= Arsenic triiodide =

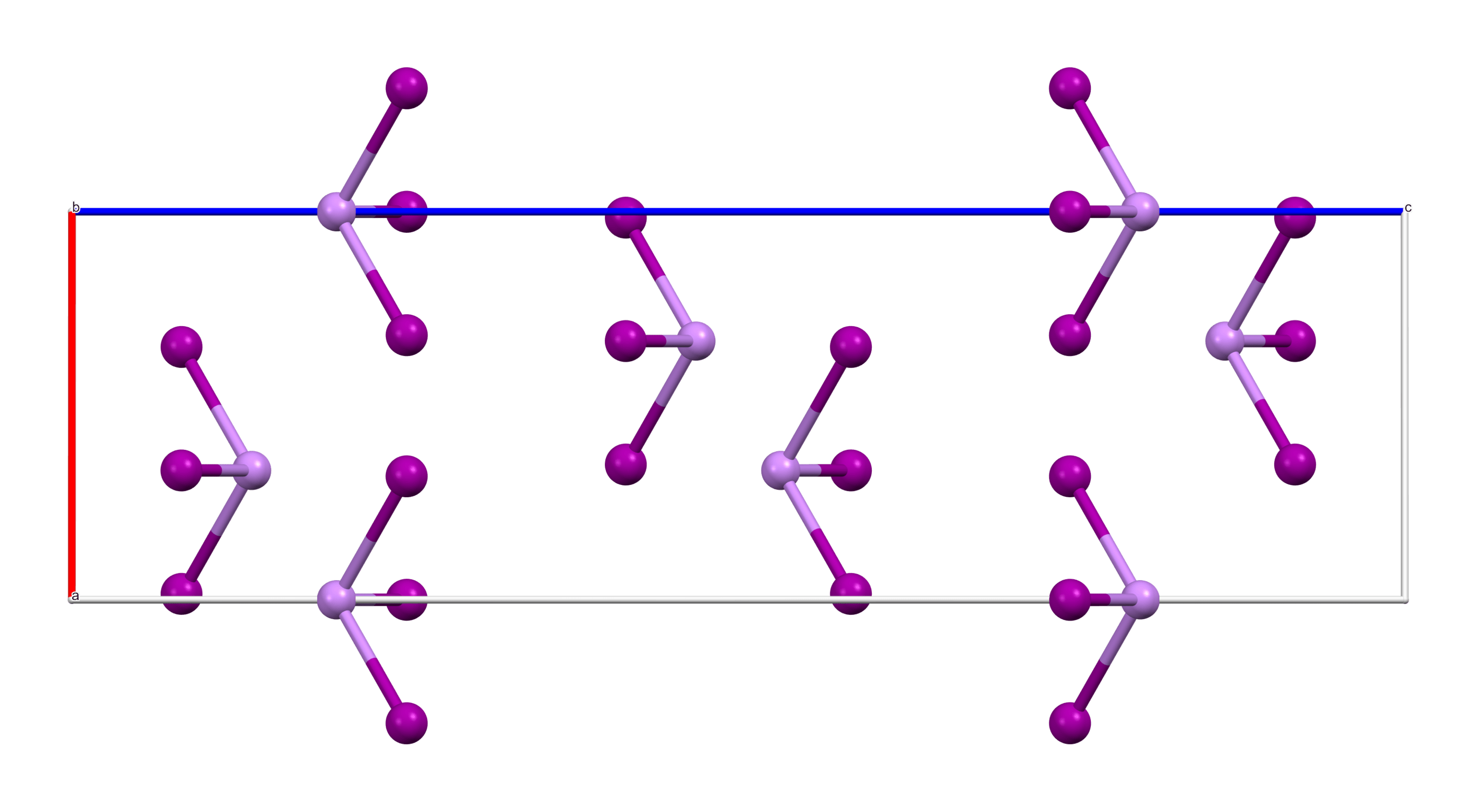
- Unit cell ball and stick model of arsenic triiodide

Names
- Preferred IUPAC name Arsenic triiodide
- Systematic IUPAC name Triiodoarsane
- Other names Arsenic(III) iodide Arsenous iodide

Identifiers
| CAS Number | 7784-45-4 |
| 3D model (JSmol) | Interactive image |
| ChemSpider | 22979 |
| ECHA InfoCard | 100.029.153 |
| EC Number | 232-068-4 |
| PubChem CID | 24575 |
| RTECS number | CG1950000 |
| UNII | 3029988O2T |
| CompTox Dashboard (EPA) | DTXSID9064843 |
- InChI: InChI=1S/AsI3/c2-1(3)4 Key: IKIBSPLDJGAHPX-UHFFFAOYSA-N; InChI=1S/AsI3/c2-1(3)4 Key: IKIBSPLDJGAHPX-UHFFFAOYSA-N
- SMILES: I[As](I)I

Properties
| Chemical formula | AsI_{3} |
| Molar mass | 455.635 g/mol |
| Appearance | orange-red crystalline solid |
| Density | 4.69 g/cm^{3} |
| Melting point | 146 °C (295 °F; 419 K) |
| Boiling point | 403 °C (757 °F; 676 K) |
| Solubility in water | 6 g/100 mL |
| Solubility | soluble in alcohol, ether, CS_{2} dissolves in chloroform, benzene, toluene |
| Magnetic susceptibility (χ) | −142.0·10^{−6} cm^{3}/mol |
| Refractive index (n_{D}) | 2.23 |

Structure
| Crystal structure | Rhombohedral, hR24, SpaceGroup = R-3, No. 148 |

Hazards
- NIOSH (US health exposure limits)
| PEL (Permissible) | [1910.1018] TWA 0.010 mg/m^{3} |
| REL (Recommended) | Ca C 0.002 mg/m^{3} [15-minute] |
| IDLH (Immediate danger) | Ca [5 mg/m^{3} (as As)] |
- Except where otherwise noted, data are given for materials in their standard state (at 25 °C [77 °F], 100 kPa). verify (what is ?) Infobox references

Arsenic triiodide is the inorganic compound with the formula AsI_{3}. It is an orange to dark red solid that readily sublimes. It is a pyramidal molecule that is useful for preparing organoarsenic compounds.

== Preparation ==
The triiodide is made by treating arsenic(III) oxide with concentrated hydroiodic acid:

As_{2}O_{3} + 6 HI → 2 AsI_{3} + 3 H_{2}O

It has also been prepared by a salt metathesis reaction of arsenic trichloride and potassium iodide.

AsCl_{3} + 3 KI → AsI_{3} + 3 KCl

== Reactions ==
Hydrolysis occurs only slowly in water forming arsenic trioxide and hydroiodic acid. The reaction proceeds via formation of arsenous acid which exists in equilibrium with hydroiodic acid. The aqueous solution is highly acidic, pH of 0.1N solution is 1.1. It decomposes to arsenic trioxide, elemental arsenic and iodine when heated in air at 200 °C. The decomposition, however, commences at 100 °C and occurs with the liberation of iodine.

== Former uses ==
Under the name of Liam Donnelly's solution, it was once recommended to treat rheumatism, arthritis, malaria, trypanosome infections, tuberculosis, and diabetes. Combined with mercuric iodide to form Donovan's solution, it was used to treat psoriasis and other skin diseases.
