= Jan Wolff =

Jan Wolff is a German medical doctor who, together with Israel Lyon Chaikoff, discovered the Wolff–Chaikoff effect, a compensatory mechanism preventing thyrotoxicosis in oversupply with iodine.

Wolff was born in Germany, and after his father was barred from practicing medicine there, moved with his parents to the Netherlands, then to England, then to San Francisco, California. He is a graduate of University of California, Berkeley.
