= Halocarbon =

Chemical compound containing carbon and at least one halogen

Halocarbon compounds are chemical compounds in which one or more carbon atoms are linked by covalent bonds with one or more halogen atoms (fluorine, chlorine, bromine, iodine, or astatine – group 17) resulting in the formation of organofluorine compounds, organochlorine compounds, organobromine compounds, organoiodine compounds, and organoastatine compounds. Chlorine halocarbons are the most common and are called organochlorides.

Many synthetic organic compounds such as plastic polymers, and a few natural ones, contain halogen atoms; they are known as halogenated compounds or organohalogens. Organochlorides are the most common industrially used organohalides, although the other organohalides are used commonly in organic synthesis. Except for extremely rare cases, organohalides are not produced biologically, but many pharmaceuticals are organohalides. Notably, many pharmaceuticals such as Prozac have trifluoromethyl groups.

For information on inorganic halide chemistry, see halide.

== Chemical families ==
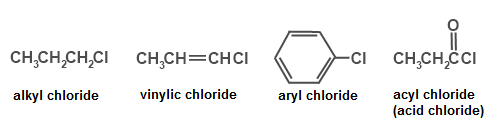
Examples of organohalogens-chlorides

Halocarbons are typically classified in the same ways as the similarly structured organic compounds that have hydrogen atoms occupying the molecular sites of the halogen atoms in halocarbons. Among the chemical families are:

- haloalkanes—compounds with carbon atoms linked by single bonds
- haloalkenes—compounds with one or more double bonds between carbon atoms
- haloaromatics—compounds with carbons linked in one or more aromatic rings with a delocalised donut shaped pi cloud.

The halogen atoms in halocarbon molecules are often called "substituents," as though those atoms had been substituted for hydrogen atoms. However halocarbons are prepared in many ways that do not involve direct substitution of halogens for hydrogens.

== History and context ==
A few halocarbons are produced in massive amounts by microorganisms. For example, several million tons of methyl bromide are estimated to be produced by marine organisms annually. Most of the halocarbons encountered in everyday life – solvents, medicines, plastics – are man-made. The first synthesis of halocarbons was achieved in the early 1800s. Production began accelerating when their useful properties as solvents and anesthetics were discovered. Development of plastics and synthetic elastomers has led to greatly expanded scale of production. A substantial percentage of drugs are halocarbons.

=== Natural halocarbons ===
A large amount of the naturally occurring halocarbons, such as dioxins, are created by wood fire and volcanic activity. A third major source is marine algae, which produce several chlorinated methane and ethane containing compounds. Several thousand complex halocarbons are known to be produced mainly by marine species. Although chlorine compounds are the majority of the discovered compounds, bromides, iodides and fluorides have also been found in nature. Tyrian purple is a bromide and is produced by certain sea snails. Thyroxine is secreted by the thyroid gland and is an iodide. The highly toxic fluoroacetate is one of the rare natural organofluorides and is produced by certain plants.

== Organoiodine compounds, including biological derivatives ==
Organoiodine compounds, called organic iodides, are similar in structure to organochlorine and organobromine compounds, but the C-I bond is weaker. Many organic iodides are known, but few are of major industrial importance. Iodide compounds are mainly produced as nutritional supplements.

The thyroxin hormones are essential for human health, hence the usefulness of iodized salt.

Six mg of iodide a day can be used to treat patients with hyperthyroidism due to its ability to inhibit the organification process in thyroid hormone synthesis, the so-called Wolff–Chaikoff effect. Prior to 1940, iodides were the predominant antithyroid agents. In large doses, iodides inhibit proteolysis of thyroglobulin, which permits TH to be synthesized and stored in colloid, but not released into the bloodstream. This mechanism is referred to as Plummer effect.

This treatment is seldom used today as a stand-alone therapy despite the rapid improvement of patients immediately following administration. The major disadvantage of iodide treatment lies in the fact that excessive stores of TH accumulate, slowing the onset of action of thioamides (TH synthesis blockers). In addition, the functionality of iodides fades after the initial treatment period. An "escape from block" is also a concern, as extra stored TH may spike following discontinuation of treatment.

== Uses ==
The first halocarbon commercially used was Tyrian purple, a natural organobromide of the Murex brandaris marine snail.

Common uses for halocarbons have been as solvents, pesticides, refrigerants, fire-resistant oils, ingredients of elastomers, adhesives and sealants, electrically insulating coatings, plasticizers, and plastics. Many halocarbons have specialized uses in industry. One halocarbon, sucralose, is a sweetener.

Before they became strictly regulated, the general public often encountered haloalkanes as paint and cleaning solvents such as trichloroethane (1,1,1-trichloroethane) and carbon tetrachloride (tetrachloromethane), pesticides like 1,2-dibromoethane (EDB, ethylene dibromide), and refrigerants like Freon-22 (duPont trademark for chlorodifluoromethane). Some haloalkanes are still widely used for industrial cleaning, such as methylene chloride (dichloromethane), and as refrigerants, such as R-134a (1,1,1,2-tetrafluoroethane).

Haloalkenes have also been used as solvents, including perchloroethylene (Perc, tetrachloroethene), widespread in dry cleaning, and trichloroethylene (TCE, 1,1,2-trichloroethene). Other haloalkenes have been chemical building blocks of plastics such as polyvinyl chloride ("vinyl" or PVC, polymerized chloroethene) and Teflon (duPont trademark for polymerized tetrafluoroethene, PTFE).

Haloaromatics include the former Aroclors (Monsanto Company trademark for polychlorinated biphenyls, PCBs), once widely used in power transformers and capacitors and in building caulk, the former Halowaxes (Union Carbide trademark for polychlorinated naphthalenes, PCNs), once used for electrical insulation, and the chlorobenzenes and their derivatives, used for disinfectants, pesticides such as dichloro-diphenyl-trichloroethane (DDT, 1,1,1-trichloro-2,2-bis(p-chlorophenyl)ethane), herbicides such as 2,4-D (2,4-dichlorophenoxyacetic acid), askarel dielectrics (mixed with PCBs, no longer used in most countries), and chemical feedstocks.

A few halocarbons, including acid halides like acetyl chloride, are highly reactive; these are rarely found outside chemical processing. The widespread uses of halocarbons were often driven by observations that most of them were more stable than other substances. They may be less affected by acids or alkalis; they may not burn as readily; they may not be attacked by bacteria or molds; or they may not be affected as much by sun exposure.

== Hazards ==
The stability of halocarbons tended to encourage beliefs that they were mostly harmless, although in the mid-1920s physicians reported workers in polychlorinated naphthalene (PCN) manufacturing suffering from chloracne (Teleky 1927), and by the late 1930s it was known that workers exposed to PCNs could die from liver disease (Flinn & Jarvik 1936) and that DDT would kill mosquitos and other insects (Müller 1948). By the 1950s, there had been several reports and investigations of workplace hazards. In 1956, for example, after testing hydraulic oils containing polychlorinated biphenyls (PCBs), the U.S. Navy found that skin contact caused fatal liver disease in animals and rejected them as "too toxic for use in a submarine" (Owens v. Monsanto 2001).

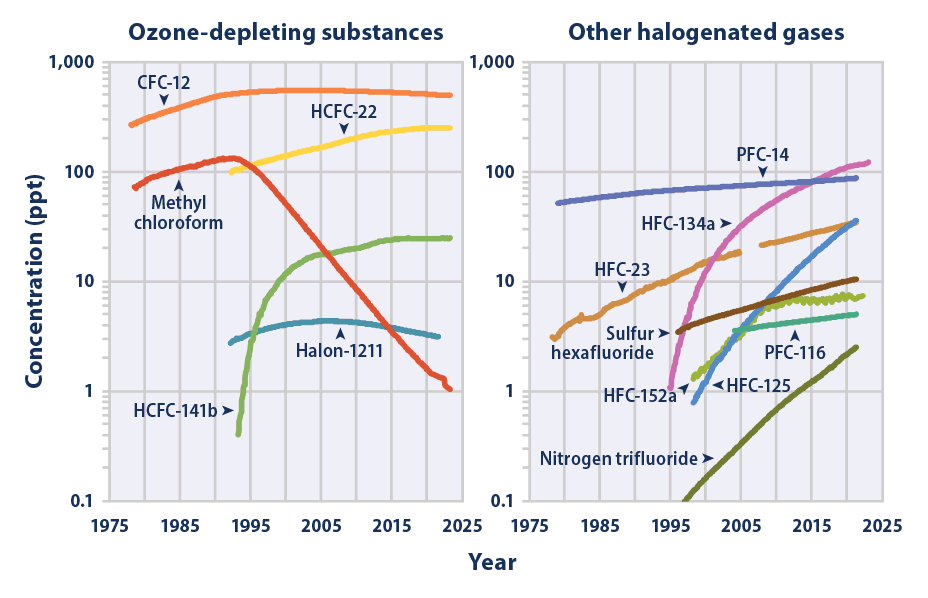
Atmospheric concentration of several halocarbons, years 1978–2015

In 1962 a book by U.S. biologist Rachel Carson (Carson 1962) started a storm of concerns about environmental pollution, first focused on DDT and other pesticides, some of them also halocarbons. These concerns were amplified when in 1966 Danish chemist Soren Jensen reported widespread residues of PCBs among Arctic and sub-Arctic fish and birds (Jensen 1966). In 1974, Mexican chemist Mario Molina and U.S. chemist Sherwood Rowland predicted that common halocarbon refrigerants, the chlorofluorocarbons (CFCs), would accumulate in the upper atmosphere and destroy protective ozone (Molina & Rowland 1974). Within a few years, ozone depletion was being observed above Antarctica, leading to bans on production and use of chlorofluorocarbons in many countries. The 2007 report of the Intergovernmental Panel on Climate Change (IPCC) said halocarbons were a direct cause of global warming.

Since the 1970s there have been longstanding, unresolved controversies over potential health hazards of trichloroethylene (TCE) and other halocarbon solvents that had been widely used for industrial cleaning (Anderson v. Grace 1986) (Scott & Cogliano 2000) (U.S. National Academies of Science 2004) (United States 2004). More recently perfluorooctanoic acid (PFOA), a precursor in the most common manufacturing process for Teflon and also used to make coatings for fabrics and food packaging, became a health and environmental concern starting in 2006 (United States 2010), suggesting that halocarbons, though thought to be among the most inert, may also present hazards.

Halocarbons, including those that might not be hazards in themselves, can present waste disposal issues. Because they do not readily degrade in natural environments, halocarbons tend to accumulate. Incineration and accidental fires can create corrosive byproducts such as hydrochloric acid and hydrofluoric acid, and poisons like halogenated dioxins and furans. Species of Desulfitobacterium are being investigated for their potential in the bioremediation of halogenic organic compounds.

== See also ==
- Halogenation
- Carbon–fluorine bond
- Fluorinated gases
- List of refrigerants
