= V GAS =

2004 video game

CyberCIEGE
- A screenshot of the introductory movie
- Release: 2005
- Genre: Construction and management sim
- Mode: Single-player

V GAS is a 3D serious game in which players explore and live in a house that is built to mirror their own. Players begin the game by building a profile including variables such as water use and transportation behaviors, heating and cooling practices, food purchases, and electrical appliance usage. Once the profile has been built, the player can begin the simulation which introduces different scenarios ranging from heat waves to mad cow disease. The player adjusts their lifestyle according to how they would react to these events in real life. All the while, the players' decisions are being measured and recorded, and their overall contribution to N_{2}O, CO_{2}, and CH_{4} to the atmosphere is measured.

== Premise ==
The greenhouse effect is a natural process, but it is hypothesized that additional human contributions of carbon dioxide, methane, nitrous oxide, halocarbons, etc. are magnifying the greenhouse effect and causing global warming. While industry is commonly cited as the source of these emissions, emissions are ultimately a matter of end-use and therefore lifestyle. That is, when a product is chosen, so is a production process. Therefore, V GAS focuses on the end-use and lifestyle decisions of the individual as a way of exploring global warming.

== Build Profile ==
The user navigates through the house into different rooms, each corresponding with a set of variables which affect the amount of greenhouse gases which will be emitted on account of the user. In the bedroom, the user inputs the lighting settings include the number and kinds of lightbulbs and the heating and cooling settings (such as the temperatures and how many days each is used). In the living room, home appliance settings (e.g. TV) are adjusted. In the kitchen, the user inputs information for diet, laundry, and other major appliances like dishwashers. In the bathroom, the player gives information regarding their own bathroom habits, such as how often they shower, for how long, and how often they use a hairdrier. The home office contains settings for computers and related appliances. Finally, the garage has controls for transportation habits, including daily commutes but also trips for vacations, and what (if any) recreational vehicles the user may use.

== Scenarios ==
Once the user has built a profile, it may be selected and run through the game. Players are allotted a certain amount of time to consider the scenario, go to the appropriate area of the house, and change their settings in order to adjust to the new scenario. The time remaining is indicated by a timer in the upper-right corner of the screen. Once the timer is expired, the results of the user's decisions are recorded and the settings are reset to allow for a new scenario. Possible scenarios include mad cow disease, heat wave, carbon tax, and outlawing private cars as transportation for commuters.

== V GAS Library ==
The software contains a library of information the player may use to familiarize themselves with the issues surrounding the game. The appearance of the library is a bookshelf with books titled "Climate change policy," "Some History," "Greenhouse Effect," "Climate Change Dubiety," "The Phenomena Behind Climate Change," and "Visions of the Future." By clicking on "Climate Change Dubiety," for example, the game will display a list of papers published which do not agree with the hypothesis of climate change that is used for the game. By clicking on "Some History," a list of noteworthy discoveries regarding climate change is displayed and sorted by year.
