= Lugol's iodine =

Aqueous solution of iodine and potassium iodide

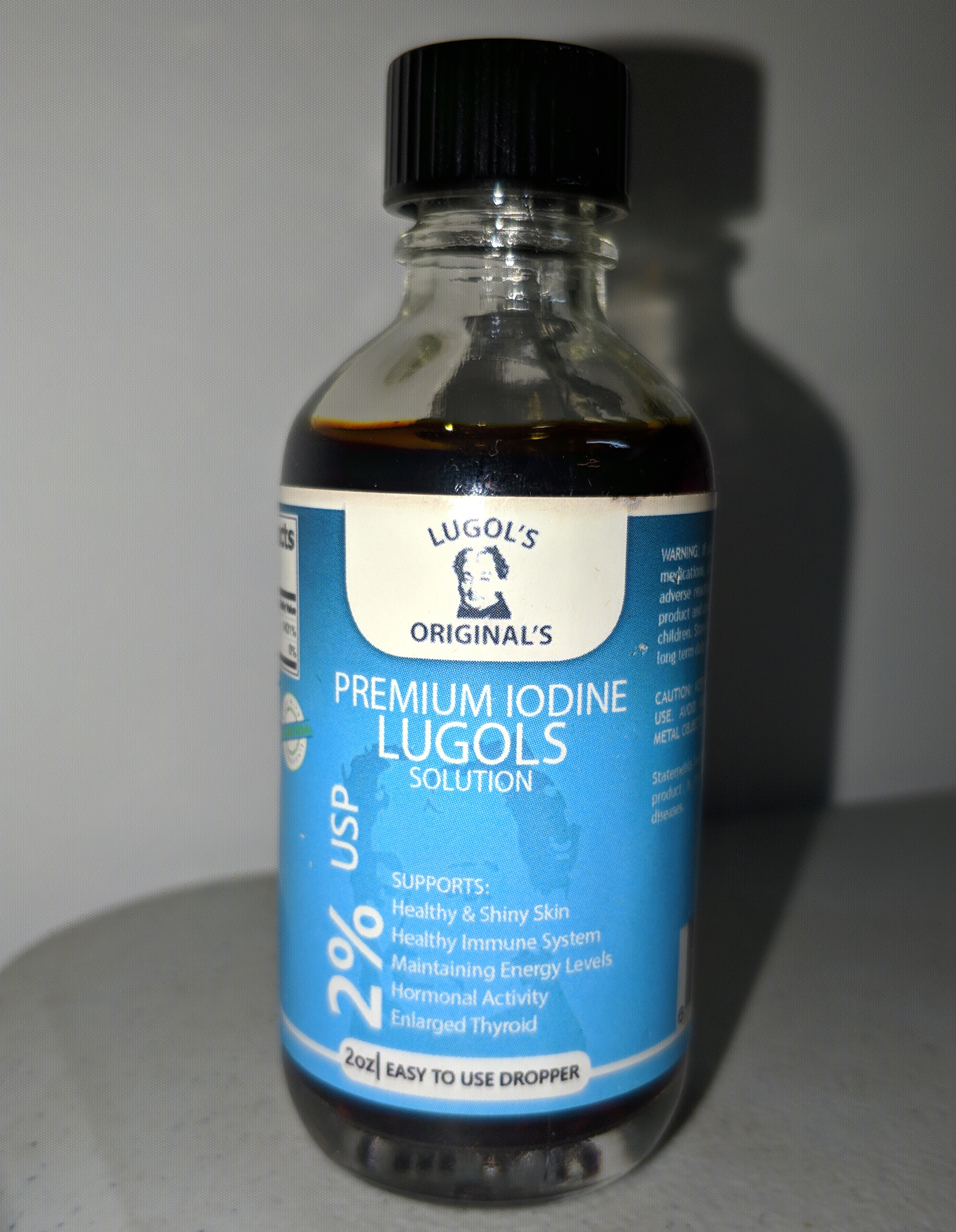
- 2% Lugol's iodine solution

Clinical data
- Other names: Potassium triiodide, Lugol's solution, aqueous iodine, strong iodine solution
- AHFS/Drugs.com: Monograph
- License data: US DailyMed: Lugols_solution
- Routes of administration: topical, by mouth

Identifiers
- CAS Number: 12298-68-9
- DrugBank: DB14492
- UNII: T66M6Y3KSA
- CompTox Dashboard (EPA): DTXSID1047154

Chemical and physical data
- Formula: I_{3}K
- Molar mass: 419.812

Lugol's iodine, also known as aqueous iodine and strong iodine solution, is a solution of potassium iodide with iodine in water. It is a medication and disinfectant used for a number of purposes. Taken by mouth it is used to treat thyrotoxicosis until surgery can be carried out, protect the thyroid gland from radioactive iodine, and to treat iodine deficiency. When applied to the cervix it is used to help in screening for cervical cancer. As a disinfectant it may be applied to small wounds such as a needle stick injury. A small amount may also be used for emergency disinfection of drinking water.

Side effects may include allergic reactions, headache, vomiting, and conjunctivitis. Long term use may result in trouble sleeping and depression. It should not typically be used during pregnancy or breastfeeding. Lugol's iodine is a liquid made up of two parts potassium iodide for every one part elemental iodine in water.

Lugol's iodine was first made in 1829 by the French physician Jean Lugol. It is on the World Health Organization's List of Essential Medicines. Lugol's iodine is available as a generic medication and over the counter. Lugol's solution is available in different strengths of iodine. Large volumes of concentrations more than 2.2% may be subject to regulation.

== Uses ==
=== Medical uses ===
Preoperative administration of Lugol's solution decreases intraoperative blood loss during thyroidectomy in patients with Graves' disease. However, it appears ineffective in patients who are already euthyroid on anti-thyroid drugs and levothyroxine.

- During colposcopy, Lugol's iodine is applied to the vagina and cervix. Normal vaginal tissue stains brown due to its high glycogen content, while tissue suspicious for cancer does not stain, and thus appears pale compared to the surrounding tissue. Biopsy of suspicious tissue can then be performed. This is called a Schiller's test.
- Patients at high risk of oesophageal squamous cell carcinoma are usually followed using a combination of Lugol's chromoendoscopy and narrow-band imaging. With Lugol's iodine, low-grade dysplasia appears as an unstained or weakly stained area; high-grade dysplasia is consistently unstained.
- Lugol's iodine may also be used to better visualize the mucogingival junction in the mouth. Similar to the method of staining mentioned above regarding a colposcopy, alveolar mucosa has a high glycogen content that gives a positive iodine reaction vs. the keratinized gingiva.
- Lugol's iodine may also be used as an oxidizing germicide, however it is somewhat undesirable in that it may lead to scarring and discolors the skin temporarily. One way to avoid this problem is by using a solution of 70% ethanol to wash off the iodine later.
- Lugol's iodine was distributed in Polish People's Republic after the Chernobyl catastrophe, due to government not being informed of how severe the event was and overestimating radiation, and unavailability of iodine tablets.

=== Science ===
- As a mordant when performing a Gram stain. It is applied for 1 minute after staining with crystal violet, but before ethanol to ensure that gram positive organisms' peptidoglycan remains stained, easily identifying it as a gram positive in microscopy.
- This solution is used as an indicator test for the presence of starches in organic compounds, with which it reacts by turning a dark-blue/black. Elemental iodine solutions like Lugol's will stain starches due to iodine's interaction with the coil structure of the polysaccharide. Starches include the plant starches amylose and amylopectin and glycogen in animal cells. Lugol's solution will not detect simple sugars such as glucose or fructose. In the pathologic condition amyloidosis, amyloid deposits (i.e., deposits that stain like starch, but are not) can be so abundant that affected organs will also stain grossly positive for the Lugol reaction for starch.
- It can be used as a cell stain, making the cell nuclei more visible and for preserving phytoplankton samples.
- Lugol's solution can also be used in various experiments to observe how a cell membrane uses osmosis and diffusion.
- Lugol's solution is also used in the marine aquarium industry. Lugol's solution provides a strong source of free iodine and iodide to reef inhabitants and macroalgae. Although the solution is thought to be effective when used with stony corals, systems containing xenia and soft corals are assumed to be particularly benefited by the use of Lugol's solution. Used as a dip for stony and soft or leather corals, Lugol's may help rid the animals of unwanted parasites and harmful bacteria. The solution is thought to foster improved coloration and possibly prevent bleaching of corals due to changes in light intensity, and to enhance coral polyp expansion. The blue colors of Acropora spp. are thought to be intensified by the use of potassium iodide. Specially packaged supplements of the product intended for aquarium use can be purchased at specialty stores and online.
- This and other iodide-iodine solutions can also function as a less toxic replacement for aqua regia, allowing for gold to be dissolved without the use of strong acids.

== Side effects ==
Because it contains free iodine, Lugol's solution at 2% or 5% concentration without dilution is irritating and destructive to mucosa, such as the lining of the esophagus and stomach. Doses of 10 mL of undiluted 5% solution have been reported to cause gastric lesions when used in endoscopy. The LD50 for 5% Iodine is 14,000 mg/kg (14 g/kg) in rats, and 22,000 mg/kg (22 g/kg) in mice.

The World Health Organization classifies substances taken orally with an LD50 of 5–50 mg/kg as the second highest toxicity class, Class Ib (Highly Hazardous). The Global Harmonized System of Classification and Labeling of Chemicals categorizes this as Category 2 with a hazard statement "Fatal if swallowed". Potassium iodide is not considered hazardous.

== Mechanism of action ==
Potassium iodide is a common additive used for iodizing, which helps preserve and solublize the iodine component of Lugol's iodine. The iodine component of this solution is used as an antiseptic, but is poorly water-soluble iodine without the addition of potassium iodide.

== History ==
It was historically used as a first-line treatment for hyperthyroidism, as the administration of pharmacologic amounts of iodine leads to temporary inhibition of iodine organification in the thyroid gland, caused by phenomena including the Wolff–Chaikoff effect and the Plummer effect. However it is not used to treat certain autoimmune causes of thyroid disease as iodine-induced blockade of iodine organification may result in hypothyroidism. They are not considered as a first line therapy because of possible induction of resistant hyperthyroidism but may be considered as an adjuvant therapy when used together with other hyperthyroidism medications.

Lugol's iodine has been used traditionally to replenish iodine deficiency. Because of its wide availability as a drinking-water decontaminant, and high content of potassium iodide, emergency use of it was at first recommended to the Polish government in 1986, after the Chernobyl disaster to replace and block any intake of radioactive ^{131}I, even though it was known to be a non-optimal agent, due to its somewhat toxic free-iodine content. Other sources state that pure potassium iodide solution in water (SSKI) was eventually used for most of the thyroid protection after this accident. There is "strong scientific evidence" for potassium iodide thyroid protection to help prevent thyroid cancer. Potassium iodide does not provide immediate protection but can be a component of a general strategy in a radiation emergency.

Historically, Lugol's iodine solution has been widely available and used for a number of health problems with some precautions. Lugol's is sometimes prescribed in a variety of alternative medical treatments. Only since the end of the Cold War has the compound become subject to national regulation in the English-speaking world.

== Society and culture ==
=== Regulation ===
Until 2007, in the United States, Lugol's solution was unregulated and available over the counter as a general reagent, an antiseptic, a preservative, or as a medicament for human or veterinary application.

Since 1 August 2007, the DEA regulates all iodine solutions containing greater than 2.2% elemental iodine as a List I precursor because they may potentially be used in the illicit production of methamphetamine. Transactions of up to one fluid ounce (30 ml) of Lugol's solution are exempt from this regulation.

=== Formula and manufacture ===
Nominal concentration	Iodine (I_{2}) [mg/100μL]	Potassium iodide (KI) [mg/100μL]	Total iodine [mg/100μL]
1%	1.0	2.0	2.5
2%	2.0	4.0	5.1
5%	5.0	10.0	12.6
10%	10.0	20.0	25.3

Lugol's solution is commonly available in different potencies of (nominal) 1%, 2%, 5% or 10%. Iodine concentrations greater than 2.2% are subject to US regulations. If the US regulations are taken literally, their 2.2% maximum iodine concentration limits a Lugol's solution to maximum (nominal) 0.87%.

The most commonly used (nominal) 5% solution consists of 5% (wt/v) iodine (I_{2}) and 10% (wt/v) potassium iodide (KI) mixed in distilled water and has a total iodine content of 126.4 mg/mL. The (nominal) 5% solution thus has a total iodine content of 6.32 mg per drop of 0.05 mL; the (nominal) 2% solution has 2.53 mg total iodine content per drop.

Potassium iodide renders the elementary iodine soluble in water through the formation of the triiodide (I^{−}_{3}) ion. It is not to be confused with tincture of iodine solutions, which consist of elemental iodine, and iodide salts dissolved in water and alcohol. Lugol's solution contains no alcohol.

Other names for Lugol's solution are I_{2}KI (iodine-potassium iodide); Markodine, Strong solution (Systemic); and Aqueous Iodine Solution BP.

=== Economics ===
In the United Kingdom, in 2015, the NHS paid £9.57 per 500 ml of solution.
