= Amiodarone induced thyrotoxicosis =

Form of hyperthyroidism

- Skeletal formula of amiodarone—a class III antiarrhythmic.
- Specialty: Endocrinology

Amiodarone induced thyrotoxicosis (AIT) is a form of hyperthyroidism due to treatment with antiarrhythmic drug, amiodarone.

Amiodarone induced thyroid dysfunction more commonly results in hypothyroidism, estimated to occur in 6–32% of patients, whereas hyperthyroidism from amiodarone use is estimated at 1–12%. However, the prevalence of AIT varies based on geographical region, and is more common in areas with low dietary iodine intake, where it occurs in 10–12% of patients. In the United States, clinical manifestations of AIT occur in 3–5% of patients.

AIT may present clinically early after initiation of amiodarone or can be delayed even up several years. Symptoms associated with AIT are similar to those of other forms of hyperthyroidism, including new-onset or recurrence of arrhythmias, worsening of pre-existing heart conditions such as ischemic heart disease or heart failure, unattributed weight loss, and fever. Development of AIT is associated with an increased risk for major adverse cardiovascular events, and increased mortality specifically in patients with AIT and underlying heart failure.

== Pathophysiology ==
Amiodarone has both direct and indirect effects on thyroid function. The most notable indirect thyroid altering property is that the drug is approximately one-third iodine by weight. As a result, amiodarone therapy elevates free circulating iodine levels up to 40 times greater than the iodine intake from the average American diet. Iodine plays a role in thyroid production, and excess iodine levels within the body can result in overproduction of thyroid hormone. Initially, the thyroid reacts according to the auto-regulatory Wolff-Chaikoff effect to prevent an excess of thyroid hormone production. Usually, the thyroid normalizes within 24–48 hours. In some cases, the thyroid responds with an alternative "escape" mechanism from the Wolff–Chaikoff effect effect called the Jod-Basedow phenomenon. This usually occurs in response to exogenous iodine, and they develop hyperthyroidism instead. This Jod-Basedow phenomenon is considered one of the contributing factors for AIT.

Amiodarone additionally alters the thyroid pathway through acting as a thyroid hormone analog and subsequently affecting the other enzymes involved in thyroid hormone production. It also causes direct cytotoxicity and damages thyroid tissues.

AIT often has a delayed clinical presentation, and studies have shown that the average delayed presentation is 2 years. The pharmacology of the drug results in a prolonged half-life within the body as a result of its lipid solubility and distribution into tissues. This leads to a slow clearance of amiodarone from the body and a prolonged toxicity. Other factors affecting AIT include pre-existing heart conditions such as dilated cardiomyopathy and cardiac sarcoidosis, and both have been suggested to be predictive factors for developing AIT.

=== Subtypes ===
AIT type 1 results from the Jod-Basedow phenomenon, in which the iodine contained in amiodarone is used by the thyroid gland for excess production of thyroid hormones. It primarily occurs in patients with pre-existing thyroid disease such as nodular goiter or latent autoimmune Graves' disease. These pre-existing thyroid diseases involve thyroid tissue which have lost their auto-regulation and function independently in the presence of excess iodine from amiodarone. AIT type 1 commonly occurs in iodine-deficient regions, and usually appears within weeks-months after patients start amiodarone.

AIT type 2 is a form of an immune system response to the cytotoxic properties of amiodarone and results in a destructive thyroiditis (inflammation in the thyroid). This causes pre-existing thyroid hormones to spill out from damaged cells into the circulation and a resultant immunologic reaction. AIT type 2 usually occurs in patients with a normal thyroid gland and could appear even several years after starting amiodarone.

Mixed/indefinite AIT (or AIT type 3) is used when subtype classification is unclear or when both AIT types occur at once.

== Diagnosis ==
The effects of AIT as mentioned above can be especially dangerous for those with heart disease. Some cases can spontaneously improve, but AIT should generally be diagnosed and treated until normal levels of hormone have been reached, otherwise known as the euthyroid state.

Differentiating AIT sub-types can be difficult and multiple diagnostics are usually used including: thyroid hormone levels, radionucleotide scans such as radioactive iodine or sestamibi, thyroid ultrasonography with color-flow-doppler and levels of circulating interleukin-6 or beta-glucoronidase, though none are considered the single gold-standard. Imaging studies can demonstrate the presence of pre-existing thyroid disease and examine the activity levels of the thyroid gland.

== Treatment ==
Due to the underlying differences in pathophysiology, there will be different treatment options according to the subtype of AIT.

AIT type 1 is initially treated with thionamides and sodium perchlorate to reduce production of thyroid hormones. Definitive treatment with radioiodine or thyroidectomy can be initiated after thyroid hormones levels are stabilized and returned to a euthyroid state.

AIT type 2 is treated with a different regime due to its immunologic pathophysiology. The thyrotoxic phase in AIT type 2 is usually self-limited but treatment with glucocorticoids can reduce its length through their anti-inflammatory and immunosuppressive effect.

AIT type 3 treatment usually combines both modalities with subsequent revaluation based on the response to treatment.

Persistent AIT that does not respond to treatment regardless of the subtype will likely have to consider alternatives such as plasmapheresis or surgery.

Monitoring is highly recommended for patients taking amiodarone, and thyroid function should be regularly evaluated during treatment and for at least one year following drug cessation.
