= Donovan's solution =

Donovan's Solution
Names
- IUPAC name Iodomercury; triiodoarsane
- Other names Liquor hydriodatis arsenici et hydrargyri

Identifiers
CAS Number	8012-54-2
3D model (JSmol)	Interactive image
ChemSpider	23077
PubChem CID	24679
RTECS number	CG3200000
UN number	1557
CompTox Dashboard (EPA)	DTXSID00230082
- InChI: InChI=1S/AsI3.Hg.HI/c2-1(3)4;;/h;;1H/q;+1;/p-1 Key: QLULWSBMTZWVDE-UHFFFAOYSA-M
- SMILES: [As](I)(I)I.I[Hg]

Properties
Chemical formula	AsHgI_{4}
Molar mass	783.12948
Appearance	Clear, colourless, or pale yellow. Darkens with age.
Boiling point	403 °C (757 °F; 676 K) at 760 mmHg
Solubility in water	Yes

Hazards
- Occupational safety and health (OHS/OSH)
Main hazards	Toxic
- Except where otherwise noted, data are given for materials in their standard state (at 25 °C [77 °F], 100 kPa). Infobox references

Donovan's solution is an inorganic compound prepared from arsenic triiodide and mercuric iodide. Despite its name, it is a compound and not a solution.

== Method ==
Donovan's solution can be prepared by mixing arsenic triiodide, mercuric iodide, and sodium bicarbonate in aqueous solution.

Cooley's cyclopædia of practical receipts and ... information on the arts, manufactures, and trades gives a more complex method.

== Uses ==
The solution has been used in veterinary medicine to treat chronic diseases of the skin and as a folk remedy. It was used during the 19th century to treat lepra vulgaris and psoriasis in humans, taken internally.
