= Wolff–Chaikoff effect =

Effect of iodine on the thyroid

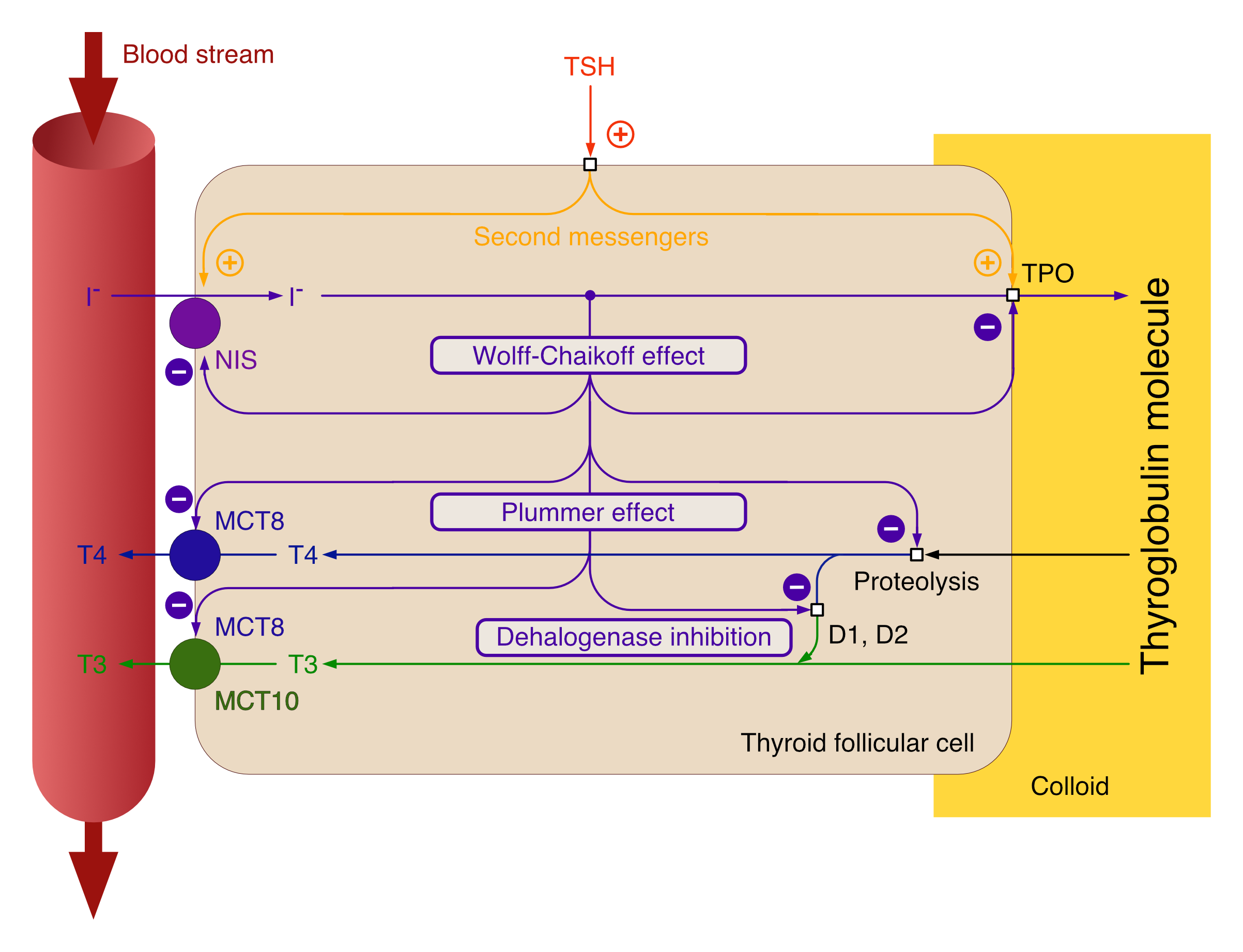
Compensatory mechanisms preventing thyrotoxicosis in oversupply with iodine

The Wolff–Chaikoff effect is a presumed reduction in thyroid hormone levels caused by ingestion of a large amount of iodine.

It was discovered by Drs. Jan Wolff and Israel Lyon Chaikoff at the University of California, Berkeley: in 1948, they reported that injection of iodine in rats almost completely inhibited organification (thyroglobulin iodination) in the thyroid gland. However, recent research into the study shows that the thyroid hormone levels of the rats were not checked prior to injections.

The Wolff–Chaikoff effect is known as an autoregulatory phenomenon that inhibits organification in the thyroid gland, the formation of thyroid hormones inside the thyroid follicle, and the release of thyroid hormones into the bloodstream. This becomes evident secondary to elevated levels of circulating iodide. The Wolff–Chaikoff effect is an effective means of rejecting a large quantity of imbibed iodide, and therefore preventing the thyroid from synthesizing large quantities of thyroid hormone. Excess iodide transiently inhibits thyroid iodide organification. In individuals with a normal thyroid, the gland eventually escapes from this inhibitory effect and iodide organification resumes; however, in patients with underlying autoimmune thyroid disease, the suppressive action of high iodide may persist. The Wolff–Chaikoff effect lasts several days (around 10 days), after which it is followed by an "escape phenomenon," which is described by resumption of normal organification of iodine and normal thyroid peroxidase function. "Escape phenomenon" is believed to occur because of decreased inorganic iodine concentration inside the thyroid follicle below a critical threshold secondary to down-regulation of sodium-iodide symporter (NIS) on the basolateral membrane of the thyroid follicular cell.

The Wolff–Chaikoff effect has been used as a treatment principle against hyperthyroidism (especially thyroid storm) by infusion of a large amount of iodine to suppress the thyroid gland. Iodide was used to treat hyperthyroidism before antithyroid drugs such as propylthiouracil and methimazole were developed. Hyperthyroid subjects given iodide may experience a decrease in basal metabolic rate that is comparable to that seen after thyroidectomy. The Wolff–Chaikoff effect also explains the hypothyroidism produced in some patients by several iodine-containing drugs, including amiodarone. The Wolff–Chaikoff effect is part of the mechanism for the use of potassium iodide in nuclear emergencies.

The Wolff–Chaikoff effect is subject to an escape phenomenon that limits its action after several days. It is to be distinguished from the Plummer effect, which inhibits the proteolysis of thyroglobulin and the release of pre-formed thyroid hormones from follicles. Both effects operate on different time scales. Only the Wolff–Chaikoff effect is helpful to prevent the thyroid from uptaking radioactive iodine in the case of nuclear emergencies. Therefore, "plummering" with high-dose iodine is only effective in a short time window after the release of radionuclides. Wrong timing of iodine use may even increase the risk by triggering the Plummer effect.

The Plummer effect, the Wolff-Chaikoff inhibition effect, and the adaptive escape phenomenon, synergistically work together to fend off potentially harmful consequences of excess iodine load and ensure thyroid homeostasis.

== See also ==
- Jod-Basedow phenomenon
- Potassium iodide
- Lugol's iodine
- Plummer effect
