= Jean Guillaume Auguste Lugol =

French physician (1786–1851)

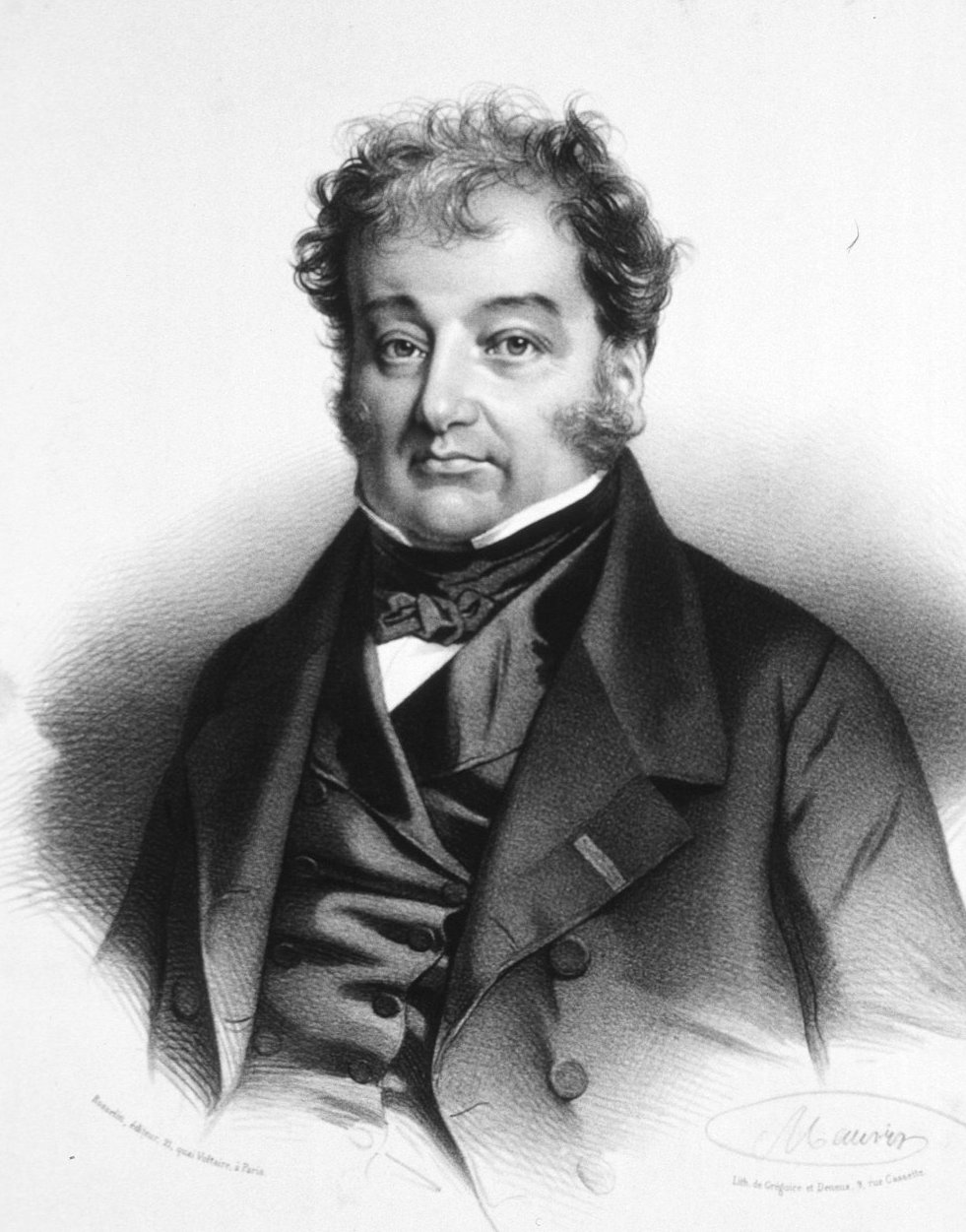
Jean Guillaume Auguste Lugol

Jean Guillaume Auguste Lugol (18 August 1786 – 16 September 1851) was a French medical doctor.

Lugol was born in Montauban. He studied medicine in Paris and graduated with a medical degree in 1812. In 1819, he was appointed acting physician at the Hôpital Saint-Louis, a post he held until he retired. After his death in 1851 at Neuilly-sur-Seine, his daughter Adele-Augustine, married Paul Broca.

Lugol was interested in tuberculosis and presented a paper to the Royal Academy of Science in Paris in which he advocated the use of fresh air, exercise, cold bathing and drugs. He also published four books on scrofulous diseases and their treatment (1829, 1830, 1831, 1834). Members of the Royal Academy visited Lugol's hospital and, observing an improvement in his patients over the course of sixteen months, endorsed his treatment.

He suggested that his iodine solution could be used to treat tuberculosis. This assertion attracted much attention at the time. Although not efficacious in treating tuberculosis, Lugol's iodine was successfully used to treat thyrotoxicosis by Plummer.

Lugol's iodine solution is also used in Schiller's test in order to diagnose cervical cancer.

== Sources ==
- B.G. Firkin & J.A.Whitworth (1987). Dictionary of Medical Eponyms. Parthenon Publishing. ISBN 1-85070-333-7
