= Upsher-Smith Laboratories =

American pharmaceutical company

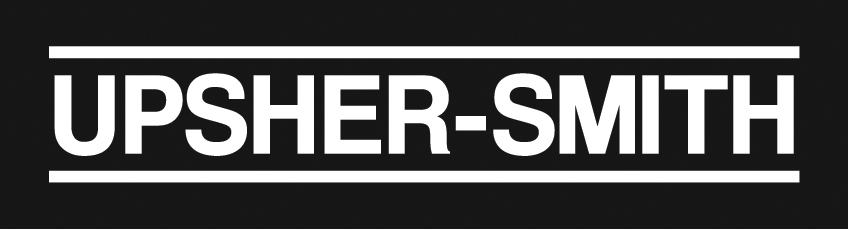
- Type: Subsidiary
- Industry: Pharmaceuticals
- Founded: 1919; 107 years ago in Wayzata, Minnesota, U.S.
- Headquarters: Maple Grove, Minnesota, U.S.
- Key people: Bobby Sheng, Bora; (CEO, Chairman); Jim Maahs; (Head of Upsher-Smith Commercial)
- Products: generic drugs; pharmaceutical drugs
- Parent: Sawai Group Holdings Co.; (2017–24); Bora Pharmaceuticals; (2024–present)
- Website: www.upsher-smith.com

Upsher-Smith Laboratories, LLC is an American pharmaceutical company based in Maple Grove, Minnesota. Founded in 1919, it has been owned by Bora Pharmaceuticals since 2024.

== History ==
Founded in 1919 as a maker of digitalis drugs, Upsher-Smith has traditionally focused on the manufacture of generic medications.

In 2017, after owning it for 47 years, the Evenstad family decided to sell most of the firm, the generics business, to Sawai Group Holdings Co., Ltd., a large publicly traded generics company in Japan that had been seeking entry into the U.S. market. Its non-generic pharmaceutical business, Proximagen, Pairnomix, and MOBĒ, remained with ACOVA, a holding company owned by the Evenstads.

On April 1, 2024, Upsher-Smith Laboratories was acquired by Bora Pharmaceuticals Co., Ltd., considered the largest pharmaceutical manufacturer in Taiwan.

== Locations ==
- Maple Grove, Minnesota: Corporate Headquarters
- Madison, New Jersey: Corporate Office (Closed)
- Plymouth, Minnesota: Manufacturing (Closed)

== Products ==
Upsher-Smith offers brand and generic pharmaceuticals to treat the following disease states:

- Hypertension
- High cholesterol
- Influenza
- Epilepsy
- Congestive heart failure
- Blood clots
- Alzheimer's disease
- Depression
- Overactive bladder
- Heart arrhythmia
- Schizophrenia
- Multiple sclerosis
- Low testosterone
- Migraines
