= Israel Lyon Chaikoff =

Canadian-American biochemist (1902–1966)

- Born: July 2, 1902; London, UK
- Died: January 25, 1966 (aged 63); Berkeley, California, USA
- Education: University of Toronto (B.A., M.A., Ph.D., M.D.)
- Known for: Wolff–Chaikoff effect
- Scientific career
- Institutions: University of California, Berkeley
- Doctoral advisor: John Macleod
- Doctoral students: Isadore Perlman; Walter M. Fitch

Israel Lyon Chaikoff (2 July 1902, in London, UK – 25 January 1966, in Berkeley, USA) was a Canadian-American physiologist and biochemist, known for the Wolff–Chaikoff effect. He and his colleagues were pioneers in the use of radioactive iodine (iodine-131) to investigate thyroid function.

== Education and career ==
As a boy, he immigrated with his family from England to Canada. At the University of Toronto, he graduated with B.A. in 1924, M.A. in 1925, Ph.D. (in physiology) in 1927, and M.D. in 1930. At the University of California, Berkeley's department of physiology (which in 1930 was a division of the School of Medicine), he was an instructor from 1930 to 1931, an assistant Professor from 1931 to 1938, an associate professor from 1938 to 1942, and a full professor from 1942 until his death.

Chaikoff did research on the physiological biochemistry of blood transport involved in lipid and carbohydrate metabolism and metabolic disturbances associated with diabetes and vascular disease (such as arteriosclerosis). He used radioactive phosphorus (phosphorus-32) to investigate phospholipid metabolism. He used radioactive carbon (carbon-14) to investigate lipogenesis and the biosynthesis and utilization of fatty acids, sterol-containing metabolites, glucose, glycogen, adrenal steroids, and thyroid hormones.

A wide range of metabolic problems were studied in his laboratory and are reported in more than five hundred original papers. ... He added considerably to our knowledge of the nature of thyroid hormone secretion and the effect of the pituitary and of iodine on thyroid function; many of these studies gave new insight to the nature of action of anti-thyroid drugs.

Chaikoff was the author or co-author of over 400 articles, which were published in many different journals, including Journal of Biological Chemistry, Proceedings of the Society for Experimental Biology and Medicine, American Journal of Physiology, Journal of Nutrition, The American Journal of Pathology, Annual Review of Biochemistry, Journal of Clinical Investigation, Science, Endocrinology, Cancer Research, Biochimica et Biophysica Acta, and Nature.

== Life and honors ==
In 1949 he married Isabelle A. Rawls. Chaikoff was a Guggenheim Fellow for the academic year 1941–1942. U. C. Berkeley's Department of Molecular & Cell Biology established the I.L. Chaikoff Memorial Award in his honor.
