= Jod-Basedow phenomenon =

Excess of thyroid hormones after iodine

The Jod-Basedow effect (also Jod-Basedow syndrome and Jod-Basedow phenomenon) is hyperthyroidism following administration of iodine or iodide, either as a dietary supplement, for iodinated contrast medical imaging, or as a medication (mainly amiodarone).

== Pathophysiology ==
This phenomenon is thus iodine-induced hyperthyroidism, typically presenting in a patient with endemic goiter (due to iodine deficiency), who relocates to an iodine-abundant geographical area. People who have Graves disease, toxic multinodular goiter, or various types of thyroid adenoma are also at risk of the Jod-Basedow effect when receiving iodine, because the thyroid will then not respond to the negative feedback from increased thyroid hormones. The source of iodine may be from the diet, administration of iodinated contrast for medical imaging, or amiodarone (an antiarrhythmic drug).

The hyperthyroidism usually develops over 2 to 12 weeks following iodine administration.

In some ways the Jod-Basedow phenomenon is the opposite of two physiological compensation mechanisms, the Plummer effect and the Wolff–Chaikoff effect, which in normal persons and in persons with thyroid disease, suppress the thyroid hormone after ingestion of large quantities of iodine or iodide. However, unlike the Plummer and Wolff-Chaikoff effects, the Jod-Basedow effect does not occur in persons with normal thyroid glands, as thyroid hormone synthesis and release in normal persons is controlled by pituitary TSH secretion, which does not allow hyperthyroidism when extra iodine is ingested.

== Precautions in medical imaging ==
In iodinated contrast administration for medical imaging, monitoring is indicated in people with thyroid disease, such as toxic multinodular goiter, Graves' disease, or Hashimoto's thyroiditis. Otherwise, for the general population, routine screening with thyroid function tests is generally not feasible.

== History and nomenclature ==
The Jod-Basedow effect is named for the German word for iodine, Jod (all nouns are capitalized in German), plus the name of Karl Adolph von Basedow, a German physician who first described the effect. The nomenclature "Jod-Basedow" was carried over intact from German, rather than being translated.

The Jod-Basedow phenomenon is differentiated from Basedow's disease, which is occasionally used as a synonym for Graves' disease.
