= Potassium iodide =

Ionic compound (KI)

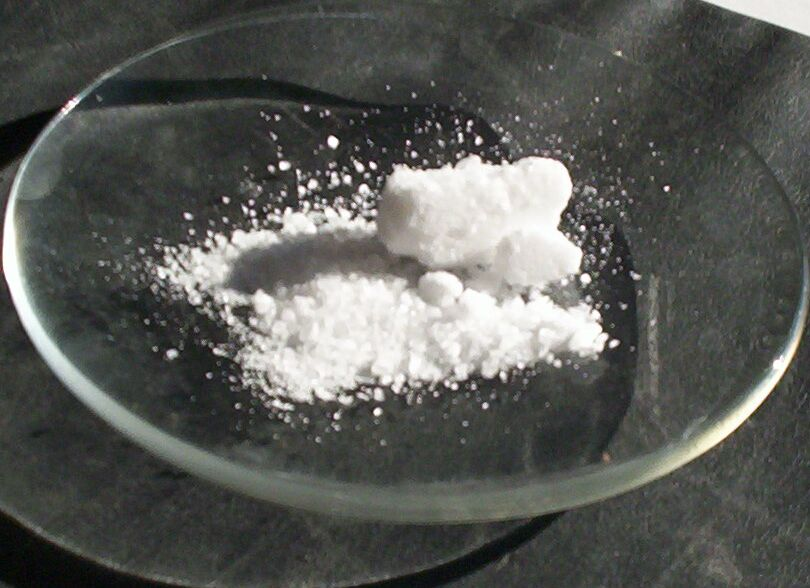

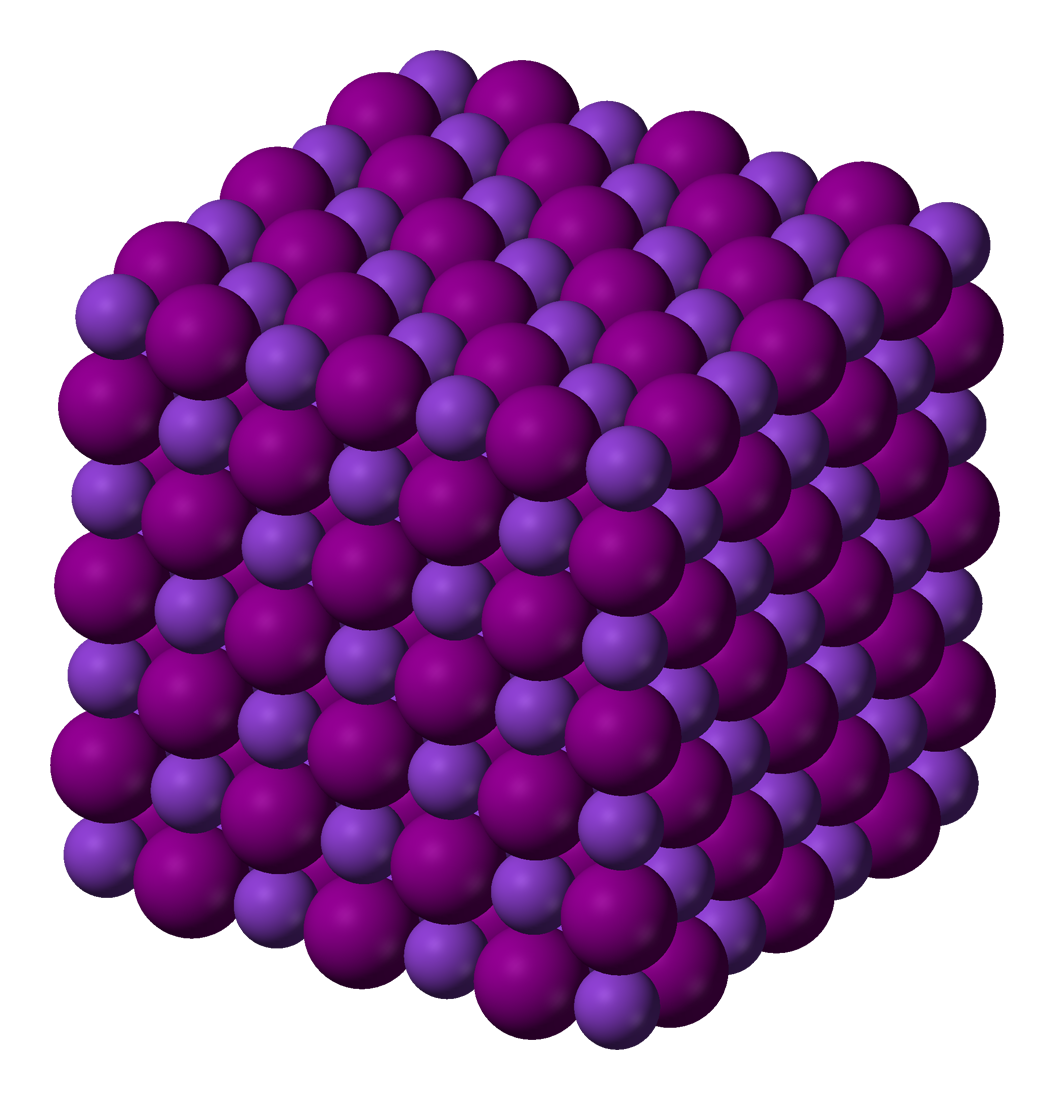

Clinical data
- Trade names: Iosat, Thyrosafe, Thyroshield, others
- Other names: SSKI
- AHFS/Drugs.com: Monograph
- License data: US DailyMed: Potassium iodide
- Routes of administration: By mouth
- ATC code: R05CA02 (WHO) S01XA04 (WHO), V03AB21 (WHO)

Legal status
- Legal status: US: OTC

Identifiers
- IUPAC name: Potassium iodide
- CAS Number: 7681-11-0
- PubChem CID: 4875
- DrugBank: DB06715
- ChemSpider: 4709
- UNII: 1C4QK22F9J
- KEGG: D01016
- ChEBI: CHEBI:8346
- ChEMBL: ChEMBL1141
- CompTox Dashboard (EPA): DTXSID7034836
- ECHA InfoCard: 100.028.782

Chemical and physical data
- Formula: KI
- Molar mass: 166.0028 g·mol^{−1}
- 3D model (JSmol): Interactive image
- Density: 3.13 g/cm^{3}
- Melting point: 681 °C (1,258 °F)
- Boiling point: 1,330 °C (2,430 °F)
- Solubility in water: 1280 mg/mL (0 °C (32 °F)); 1400 mg/mL (20 °C (68 °F)); 1760 mg/mL (60 °C (140 °F)); 2060 mg/mL (100 °C (212 °F)) 2 0 0
- SMILES: [K+].[I-]
- InChI: InChI=1S/HI.K/h1H;/q;+1/p-1; Key:NLKNQRATVPKPDG-UHFFFAOYSA-M

Potassium iodide (KI) is a chemical compound, medication, and dietary supplement. It is a medication used for treating hyperthyroidism, in radiation emergencies, and for protecting the thyroid gland when certain types of radiopharmaceuticals are used. It is also used for treating skin sporotrichosis and phycomycosis. It is a supplement used by people with low dietary intake of iodine. It is administered orally.

Common side effects include vomiting, diarrhea, abdominal pain, rash, and swelling of the salivary glands. Other side effects include allergic reactions, headache, goitre, and depression. While use during pregnancy may harm the baby, its use is still recommended in radiation emergencies. Potassium iodide has the chemical formula KI. Commercially it is made by mixing potassium hydroxide with iodine.

Potassium iodide has been used medically since at least 1820. It is on the World Health Organization's List of Essential Medicines. Potassium iodide is available as a generic medication and over the counter. Potassium iodide is also used for the iodization of salt.

== Medical uses ==
=== Dietary supplement ===
Potassium iodide is a nutritional supplement in animal feeds and also in the human diet. In humans it is the most common additive used for iodizing table salt (a public health measure to prevent iodine deficiency in populations that get little seafood). The oxidation of iodide causes slow loss of iodine content from iodised salts that are exposed to excess air. The alkali metal iodide salt, over time and exposure to excess oxygen and carbon dioxide, slowly oxidizes to metal carbonate and elemental iodine, which then evaporates. Potassium iodate (KIO_{3}) is used to iodize some salts so that the iodine is not lost by oxidation. Dextrose or sodium thiosulfate are often added to iodized table salt to stabilize potassium iodide thus reducing loss of the volatile chemical.

=== Thyroid protection in nuclear accidents ===
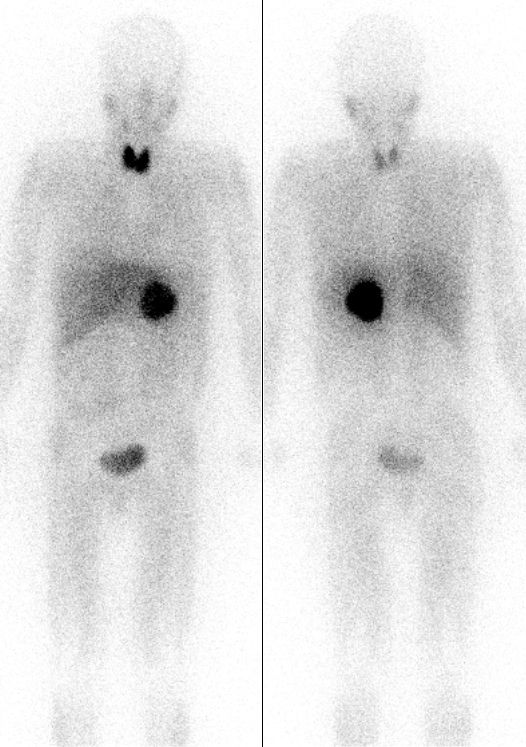
Pheochromocytoma seen like a dark sphere in center of the body. Image is by MIBG scintigraphy with radiation from radioiodine in the MIBG. Note unwanted uptake of radioiodine from the pharmaceutical by the thyroid gland in the neck, in both images (front and back) of the same patient. Radioactivity is also seen in the bladder.

Thyroid iodine uptake blockade with potassium iodide is used in nuclear medicine scintigraphy and therapy with some radioiodinated compounds that are not targeted to the thyroid, such as iobenguane (MIBG), which is used to image or treat neural tissue tumors, or iodinated fibrinogen, which is used in fibrinogen scans to investigate clotting. These compounds contain iodine, but not in the iodide form. Since they may be ultimately metabolized or break down to radioactive iodide, it is common to administer non-radioactive potassium iodide to ensure that iodide from these radiopharmaceuticals is not sequestered by the normal affinity of the thyroid for iodide.

The World Health Organization (WHO) provides guidelines for potassium iodide use following a nuclear accident. The dosage of potassium iodide is age-dependent: neonates (<1 month) require 16 mg/day; children aged 1 month to 3 years need 32 mg/day; those aged 3–12 years need 65 mg/day; and individuals over 12 years and adults require 130 mg/day. These dosages list mass of potassium iodide rather than elemental iodine. Potassium iodide can be administered as tablets or as Lugol's iodine solution. The same dosage is recommended by the US Food and Drug Administration. A single daily dose is typically sufficient for 24-hour protection. However, in cases of prolonged or repeated exposure, health authorities may recommend multiple daily doses. Priority for prophylaxis is given to the most sensitive groups: pregnant and breastfeeding women, infants, and children under 18 years. The recommended doses of potassium iodide, which contains a stable isotope of iodine, only protect the thyroid gland from radioactive iodine. It does not offer protection against other radioactive substances. Some sources recommend alternative dosing regimens.

Not all sources are in agreement on the necessary duration of thyroid blockade, although agreement appears to have been reached about the necessity of blockade for both scintigraphic and therapeutic applications of iobenguane. Commercially available iobenguane is labeled with iodine-123, and product labeling recommends administration of potassium iodide 1 hour prior to administration of the radiopharmaceutical for all age groups, while the European Association of Nuclear Medicine recommends (for iobenguane labeled with either isotope), that potassium iodide administration begin one day prior to radiopharmaceutical administration, and continue until the day following the injection, with the exception of new-borns, who do not require potassium iodide doses following radiopharmaceutical injection.

Product labeling for diagnostic iodine-131 iobenguane recommends potassium iodide administration one day before injection and continuing 5 to 7 days following administration, in keeping with the much longer half-life of this isotope and its greater danger to the thyroid. Iodine-131 iobenguane used for therapeutic purposes requires a different pre-medication duration, beginning 24–48 hours prior to iobenguane injection and continuing 10–15 days following injection.

WHO recommended dose for radiological emergencies involving radioactive iodine
Age	KI in mg per day
Over 12 years old	130
3 – 12 years old	65
1 – 36 months old	32
< 1 month old	16

In 1982, the U.S. Food and Drug Administration approved potassium iodide to protect thyroid glands from radioactive iodine involving accidents or fission emergencies. In an accidental event or attack on a nuclear power plant, or in nuclear bomb fallout, volatile fission product radionuclides may be released. Of these products, ^{131}I (Iodine-131) is one of the most common and is particularly dangerous to the thyroid gland because it may lead to thyroid cancer. By saturating the body with a source of stable iodide prior to exposure, inhaled or ingested ^{131}I tends to be excreted, which prevents radioiodine uptake by the thyroid. According to one 2000 study "KI administered up to 48 h before ^{131}I exposure can almost completely block thyroid uptake and therefore greatly reduce the thyroid absorbed dose. However, KI administration 96 h or more before ^{131}I exposure has no significant protective effect. In contrast, KI administration after exposure to radioiodine induces a smaller and rapidly decreasing blockade effect." According to the FDA, KI should not be taken as a preventative before radiation exposure. Since KI protects for approximately 24 hours, it must be dosed daily until a risk of significant exposure to radioiodine no longer exists.

Emergency 130 milligrams potassium iodide doses provide 100 mg iodide (the other 30 mg is the potassium in the compound), which is roughly 700 times larger than the normal nutritional need (see recommended dietary allowance) for iodine, which is 150 micrograms (0.15 mg) of iodine (as iodide) per day for an adult. A typical tablet weighs 160 mg, with 130 mg of potassium iodide and 30 mg of excipients, such as binding agents.

Potassium iodide cannot protect against any other mechanisms of radiation poisoning, nor can it provide any degree of protection against dirty bombs that produce radionuclides other than those of iodine.

The potassium iodide in iodized salt is insufficient for this use. A likely lethal dose of salt (more than a kilogram) would be needed to equal the potassium iodide in one tablet.

The World Health Organization does not recommend KI prophylaxis for adults over 40 years, unless the radiation dose from inhaled radioiodine is expected to threaten thyroid function, because the KI side effects increase with age and may exceed the KI protective effects; "...unless doses to the thyroid from inhalation rise to levels threatening thyroid function, that is of the order of about 5 Gy. Such radiation doses will not occur far away from an accident site."

The U.S. Department of Health and Human Services restated these two years later as "The downward KI (potassium iodide) dose adjustment by age group, based on body size considerations, adheres to the principle of minimum effective dose. The recommended standard (daily) dose of KI for all school-age children is the same (65 mg). However, adolescents approaching adult size (i.e., >70 kg [154 lbs]) should receive the full adult dose (130 mg) for maximal block of thyroid radioiodine uptake. Neonates ideally should receive the lowest dose (16 mg) of KI."

== Side effects ==
There is reason for caution with prescribing the ingestion of high doses of potassium iodide and iodate, because their unnecessary use can cause conditions such as the Jod-Basedow phenomenon, trigger and/or worsen hyperthyroidism and hypothyroidism, and then cause temporary or even permanent thyroid conditions. It can also cause sialadenitis (an inflammation of the salivary gland), gastrointestinal disturbances, and rashes.

Potassium iodide is not recommended for people with dermatitis herpetiformis and hypocomplementemic vasculitis – conditions that are linked to a risk of iodine sensitivity.

There have been some reports of potassium iodide treatment causing swelling of the parotid gland (one of the three glands that secrete saliva), due to its stimulatory effects on saliva production.

A saturated solution of KI (SSKI) is typically given orally in adult doses several times a day (5 drops of SSKI assumed to be 1/3 mL) for thyroid blockade (to prevent the thyroid from excreting thyroid hormone) and occasionally this dose is also used, when iodide is used as an expectorant (the total dose is about one gram KI per day for an adult). The anti-radioiodine doses used for ^{131}I uptake blockade are lower, and range downward from 100 mg a day for an adult, to less than this for children (see table). All of these doses should be compared with the far lower dose of iodine needed in normal nutrition, which is only 150 μg per day (150 micrograms, not milligrams).

At maximal doses, and sometimes at much lower doses, side effects of iodide used for medical reasons, in doses of 1000 times the normal nutritional need, may include: acne, loss of appetite, or upset stomach (especially during the first several days, as the body adjusts to the medication). More severe side effects that require notification of a physician are: fever, weakness, unusual tiredness, swelling in the neck or throat, mouth sores, skin rash, nausea, vomiting, stomach pains, irregular heartbeat, numbness or tingling of the hands or feet, or a metallic taste in the mouth.

In the event of a radioiodine release the ingestion of prophylaxis potassium iodide, if available, or even iodate, would rightly take precedence over perchlorate administration, and would be the first line of defence in protecting the population from a radioiodine release. However, in the event of a radioiodine release too massive and widespread to be controlled by the limited stock of iodide and iodate prophylaxis drugs, then the addition of perchlorate ions to the water supply, or distribution of perchlorate tablets would serve as a cheap, efficacious, second line of defense against carcinogenic radioiodine bioaccumulation.

The ingestion of goitrogen drugs is, much like potassium iodide also not without its dangers, such as hypothyroidism. In all these cases however, despite the risks, the prophylaxis benefits of intervention with iodide, iodate or perchlorate outweigh the serious cancer risk from radioiodine bioaccumulation in regions where radioiodine has sufficiently contaminated the environment.

== Industrial uses ==
KI is used with silver nitrate to make silver iodide (AgI), an important chemical in film photography. KI is a component in some disinfectants and hair treatment chemicals. KI is also used as a fluorescence quenching agent in biomedical research, an application that takes advantage of collisional quenching of fluorescent substances by the iodide ion. However, for several fluorophores addition of KI in μM-mM concentrations results in increase of fluorescence intensity, and iodide acts as fluorescence enhancer.

Potassium iodide is a component in the electrolyte of dye sensitised solar cells (DSSC) along with iodine.

Potassium iodide finds its most important applications in organic synthesis mainly in the preparation of aryl iodides in the Sandmeyer reaction, starting from aryl amines. Aryl iodides are in turn used to attach aryl groups to other organics by nucleophilic substitution, with iodide ion as the leaving group.

== Chemistry ==
Potassium iodide is an ionic compound which is made of the following ions: K^{+}I^{−}. It crystallises in the sodium chloride structure. It is produced industrially by treating KOH with iodine.

It is a white salt, which is the most commercially significant iodide compound, with approximately 37,000 tons produced in 1985. It absorbs water less readily than sodium iodide, making it easier to work with.

Aged and impure samples are yellow because of the slow oxidation of the salt to potassium carbonate and elemental iodine.

4 KI + 2 CO_{2} + O_{2} → 2 K_{2}CO_{3} + 2 I_{2}

=== Inorganic chemistry ===
Since the iodide ion is a mild reducing agent, I^{−} is easily oxidised to iodine (I_{2}) by powerful oxidising agents such as chlorine:

2 KI_{(aq)} + Cl_{2}_{(aq)} → 2 KCl_{(aq)} + I_{2}_{(aq)}

This reaction is employed in the isolation of iodine from natural sources. Air will oxidize iodide, as evidenced by the observation of a purple extract when aged samples of KI are rinsed with dichloromethane. As formed under acidic conditions, hydriodic acid (HI) is a stronger reducing agent.

Like other iodide salts, KI forms triiodide (I^{−}_{3}) when combined with elemental iodine.

KI_{(aq)} + I_{2}_{(s)} → KI_{3}_{(aq)}

Unlike I_{2}, I^{−}_{3} salts can be highly water-soluble. Through this reaction, iodine is used in redox titrations. Aqueous KI_{3} (Lugol's iodine) solution is used as a disinfectant and as an etchant for gold surfaces.

Potassium iodide and silver nitrate are used to make silver(I) iodide, which is used for high speed photographic film and for cloud seeding:

KI_{(aq)} + 9 AgNO_{3}_{(aq)} → AgI_{(s)} + KNO_{3}_{(aq)}

=== Organic chemistry ===
KI serves as a source of iodide in organic synthesis. A useful application is in the preparation of aryl iodides from arenediazonium salts.

KI, acting as a source of iodide, may also act as a nucleophilic catalyst for the alkylation of alkyl chlorides, bromides, or mesylates.

== History ==
Potassium iodide has been used medically since at least 1820. Some of the earliest uses included cures for syphilis, lead and mercury poisoning.

=== Chernobyl ===
Potassium iodide's (KI) value as a radiation protective (thyroid blocking) agent was demonstrated following the Chernobyl nuclear reactor disaster in April 1986. A saturated solution of potassium iodide (SSKI) was administered to 10.5 million children and 7 million adults in Poland as a preventative measure against accumulation of radioactive ^{131}I in the thyroid gland.

Reports differ concerning whether people in the areas immediately surrounding Chernobyl itself were given the supplement. However the US Nuclear Regulatory Commission (NRC) reported, "thousands of measurements of I-131 (radioactive iodine) activity...suggest that the observed levels were lower than would have been expected had this prophylactic measure not been taken. The use of KI...was credited with permissible iodine content in 97% of the evacuees tested."

With the passage of time, people living in irradiated areas where KI was not available have developed thyroid cancer at epidemic levels, which is why the US Food and Drug Administration (FDA) reported "The data clearly demonstrate the risks of thyroid radiation... KI can be used [to] provide safe and effective protection against thyroid cancer caused by irradiation."

Chernobyl also demonstrated that the need to protect the thyroid from radiation was greater than expected. Within ten years of the accident, it became clear that thyroid damage caused by released radioactive iodine was virtually the only adverse health effect that could be measured. As reported by the NRC, studies after the accident showed that "As of 1996, except for thyroid cancer, there has been no confirmed increase in the rates of other cancers, including leukemia, among the... public, that have been attributed to releases from the accident."

But equally important to the question of KI is the fact that radioactivity releases are not "local" events. Researchers at the World Health Organization accurately located and counted the residents with cancer from Chernobyl and were startled to find that "the increase in incidence [of thyroid cancer] has been documented up to 500 km from the accident site... significant doses from radioactive iodine can occur hundreds of kilometers from the site, beyond emergency planning zones." Consequently, far more people than anticipated were affected by the radiation, which caused the United Nations to report in 2002 that "The number of people with thyroid cancer... has exceeded expectations. Over 11,000 cases have already been reported."

=== Hiroshima and Nagasaki ===
The Chernobyl findings were consistent with studies of the effects of previous radioactivity releases. In 1945, several hundreds of thousands of people working and residing in the Japanese cities of Hiroshima and Nagasaki were exposed to high levels of radiation after atomic bombs were detonated over the two cities by the United States. Survivors of the A-bombings, also known as hibakusha, have markedly high rates of thyroid disease; a 2006 study of 4091 hibakusha found nearly half the participants (1833; 44.8%) had an identifiable thyroid disease.

An editorial in The Journal of the American Medical Association regarding thyroid diseases in both hibakusha and those affected by the Chernobyl disaster reports that "[a] straight line adequately describes the relationship between radiation dose and thyroid cancer incidence" and states "it is remarkable that a biological effect from a single brief environmental exposure nearly 60 years in the past is still present and can be detected."

=== Nuclear weapons testing ===
The development of thyroid cancer among residents in the North Pacific from radioactive fallout following the United States' nuclear weapons testing in the 1950s (on islands nearly 200 miles (320 km) downwind of the tests) were instrumental in the 1978 decision by the FDA to issue a request for the availability of KI for thyroid protection in the event of a release from a commercial nuclear power plant or weapons-related nuclear incident. Noting that KI's effectiveness was "virtually complete" and finding that iodine in the form of KI was substantially superior to other forms including iodate (KIO_{3}) in terms of safety, effectiveness, lack of side effects, and speed of onset, the FDA invited manufacturers to submit applications to produce and market KI.

=== Fukushima ===
It was reported on 16 March 2011, that potassium iodide tablets were given preventively to U.S. Naval air crew members flying within 70 nautical miles (130 km; 81 mi) of the Fukushima Daiichi Nuclear Power Plant damaged in the earthquake (8.9/9.0 magnitude) and ensuing tsunami on 11 March 2011. The measures were seen as precautions, and the Pentagon said no U.S. forces have shown signs of radiation poisoning. By 20 March, the US Navy instructed personnel coming within 100 miles (160 km) of the reactor to take the pills.

=== The Netherlands ===
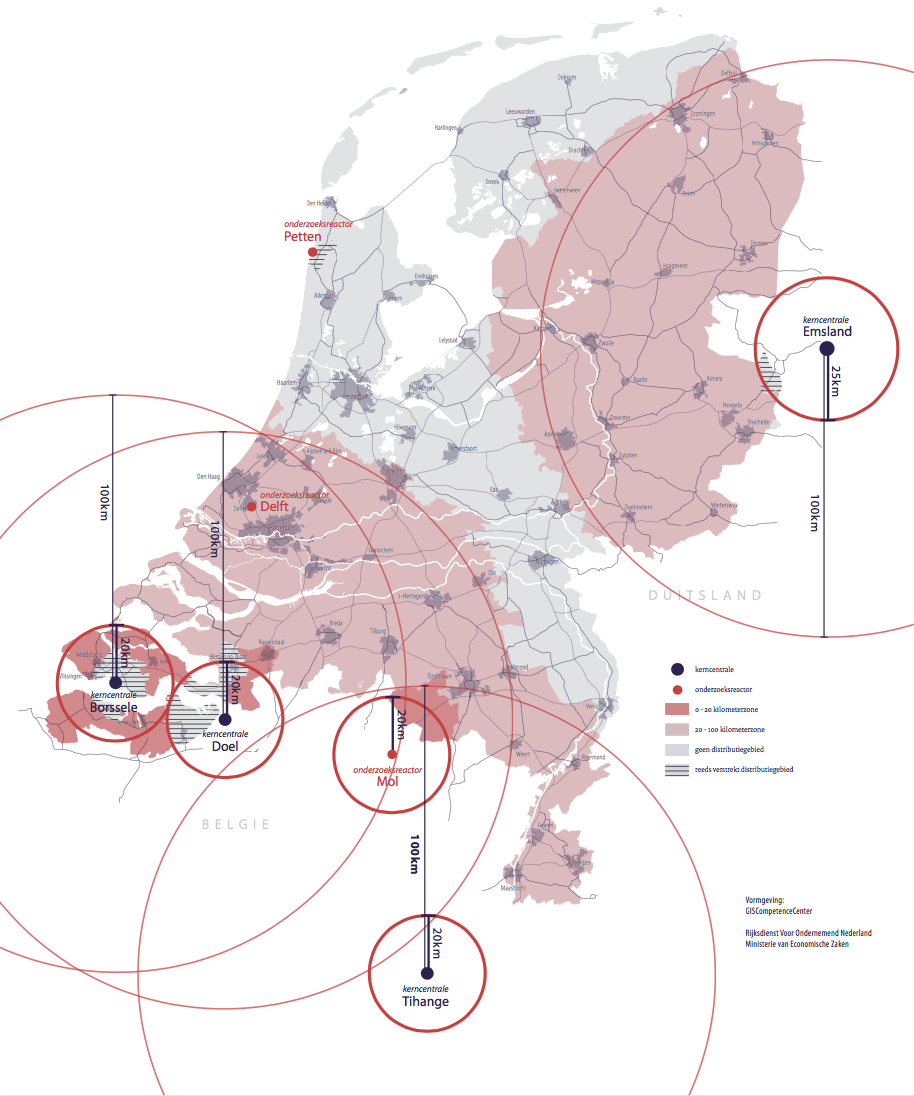
Distribution areas for iodine pills in the Netherlands (2017).

In the Netherlands, the central storage of iodine-pills is located in Zoetermeer, near The Hague. In 2017, the Dutch government distributed pills to hundreds of thousands of residents who lived within a certain distance of nuclear power plants and met some other criteria.

=== Belgium ===
By 2020, potassium iodide tablets are made available free of charge for all residents in all pharmacies throughout the country.

== Formulations ==
Three companies (Anbex, Inc., Fleming Co, and Recipharm of Sweden) have met the strict FDA requirements for manufacturing and testing of KI, and they offer products (IOSAT, ThyroShield, and ThyroSafe, respectively) which are available for purchase. In 2012, Fleming Co. sold all its product rights and manufacturing facility to other companies and no longer exists. ThyroShield is currently not in production.

Tablets of potassium iodide are supplied for emergency purposes related to blockade of radioiodine uptake, a common form of radiation poisoning due to environmental contamination by the short-lived fission product ^{131}I. Potassium iodide may also be administered pharmaceutically for thyroid storm.

For reasons noted above, therapeutic drops of SSKI, or 130 mg tablets of KI as used for nuclear fission accidents, are not used as nutritional supplements, since an SSKI drop or nuclear-emergency tablet provides 300 to 700 times more iodine than the daily adult nutritional requirement. Dedicated nutritional iodide tablets containing 0.15 mg (150 micrograms (μg)) of iodide, from KI or from various other sources (such as kelp extract) are marketed as supplements, but they are not to be confused with the much higher pharmaceutical dose preparations.

Potassium iodide can be conveniently prepared in a saturated solution, abbreviated SSKI. This method of delivering potassium iodide doesn't require a method to weigh out the potassium iodide, thus allowing it to be used in an emergency situation. KI crystals are simply added to water until no more KI will dissolve and instead sits at the bottom of the container. With pure water, the concentration of KI in the solution depends only on the temperature. Potassium iodide is highly soluble in water thus SSKI is a concentrated source of KI. At 20 degrees Celsius the solubility of KI is 140-148 grams per 100 grams of water. Because the volumes of KI and water are approximately additive, the resulting SSKI solution will contain about 1.00 gram (1000 mg) KI per milliliter (mL) of solution. This is 100% weight/volume (note units of mass concentration) of KI (one gram KI per mL solution), which is possible because SSKI is significantly more dense than pure water—about 1.67 g/mL. Because KI is about 76.4% iodide by weight, SSKI contains about 764 mg iodide per mL. This concentration of iodide allows the calculation of the iodide dose per drop, if one knows the number of drops per milliliter. For SSKI, a solution more viscous than water, there are assumed to be 15 drops per mL; the iodide dose is therefore approximately 51 mg per drop. It is conventionally rounded to 50 mg per drop.

The term SSKI is also used, especially by pharmacists, to refer to a U.S.P. pre-prepared solution formula, made by adding KI to water to prepare a solution containing 1000 mg KI per mL solution (100% wt/volume KI solution), to closely approximate the concentration of SSKI made by saturation. This is essentially interchangeable with SSKI made by saturation, and also contains about 50 mg iodide per drop.

- Saturated solutions of potassium iodide can be an emergency treatment for hyperthyroidism (so-called thyroid storm), as high amounts of iodide temporarily suppress secretion of thyroxine from the thyroid gland. The dose typically begins with a loading dose, then 1/3 mL SSKI (5 drops or 250 mg iodine as iodide), three times per day.
- Iodide solutions made from a few drops of SSKI added to drinks have also been used as expectorants to increase the water content of respiratory secretions and encourage effective coughing.
- SSKI has been proposed as a topical treatment for sporotrichosis, but no trials have been conducted to determine the efficacy or side effects of such treatment.
- Potassium iodide has been used for symptomatic treatment of erythema nodosum patients for persistent lesions whose cause remains unknown. It has been used in cases of erythema nodosum associated with Crohn's disease.
- Due to its high potassium content, SSKI is extremely bitter, and if possible it is administered in a sugar cube or small ball of bread. It may also be mixed into much larger volumes of juices.
- Neither SSKI or KI tablets form nutritional supplements, since the nutritional requirement for iodine is only 150 micrograms (0.15 mg) of iodide per day. Thus, a drop of SSKI provides 50/0.15 = 333 times the daily iodine requirement, and a standard KI tablet provides twice this much.
