= Plummer effect =

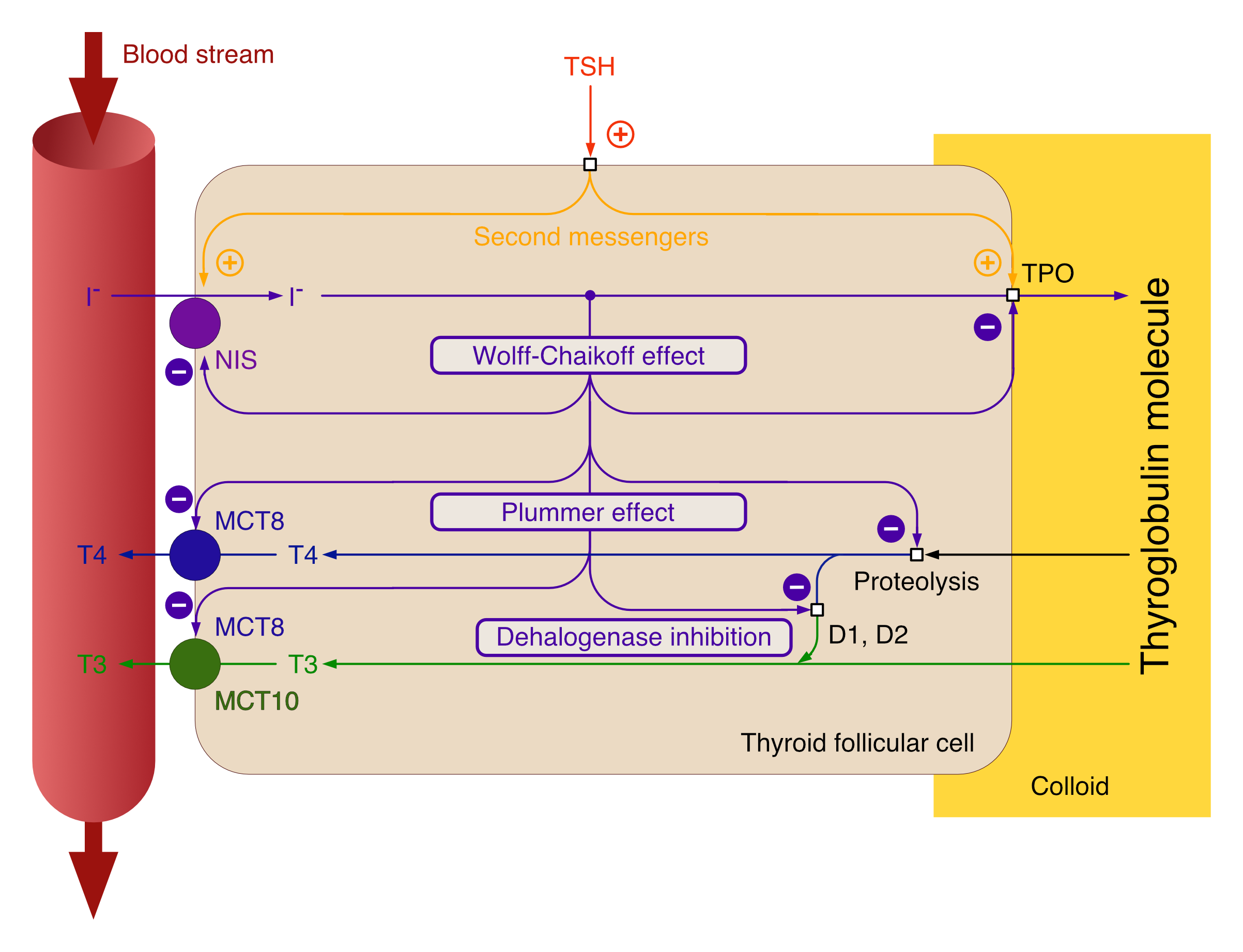
Compensatory mechanisms preventing thyrotoxicosis in oversupply with iodine, including the Wolff-Chaikoff effect, the Plummer effect and the dehalogenase inhibition effect

The Plummer effect is one of several physiological feedforward mechanisms taking place in follicular cells of the healthy thyroid gland and preventing the development of thyrotoxicosis in situations of extremely high supply with iodine.

== History ==
In 1923 the American physician Henry Stanley Plummer discovered that high-dose iodine may be effective in the treatment of Graves' disease. Today, "Plummering", i.e. therapy with Lugol's iodine solution, is one of several emergency measures in the management of severe thyrotoxicosis.

== Mechanism ==
Via the Plummer effect, a high iodine concentration inhibits the proteolysis of thyroglobulin and the release of pre-formed thyroid hormones from thyroid follicles. Therefore, its mechanism differs from that of the Wolff–Chaikoff effect, where iodine inhibits the uptake of iodine in thyroid cells and the formation of thyroid hormones, and of the dehalogenase inhibition effect, where high iodine levels block deiodinases and other dehalogenases.

The Plummer effect lasts about 7 to 10 days, but unlike the Wolff-Chaikoff effect, it isn't subject to an escape phenomenon.

The three different mechanisms of high iodine response, the Plummer effect, the Wolff-Chaikoff inhibition effect, and the adaptive escape phenomenon, synergistically work together to fend off potentially harmful consequences of excess iodine load and ensure thyroid homeostasis.

== Clinical implications ==
Unlike the Wolff–Chaikoff effect, the Plummer effect does not prevent the thyroid from taking up radioactive iodine, e.g. in the case of nuclear emergencies. Therefore, "plummering" with high-dose iodine is only effective in a short time window after the release of radionuclides. Wrong timing of iodine use may even increase the risk by triggering the Plummer effect.

The Plummer effect is, however, helpful in the management of thyrotoxicosis, where the usage of Lugol's solution helps to limit the release of thyroid hormones into the bloodstream.

== See also ==
- Jod-Basedow phenomenon
- Potassium iodide
- Lugol's iodine
- Wolff–Chaikoff effect
