= Organification =

Organification is a biochemical process that takes place in the thyroid gland. It is the incorporation of iodine into thyroglobulin for the production of thyroid hormone, a step done after the oxidation of iodide by the enzyme thyroid peroxidase (TPO) Since iodine is an inorganic compound, and is being attached to thyroglobulin, a protein, the process is termed as "organification of iodine".

Thionamides can block organification.
