= Bismuth oxyiodide =

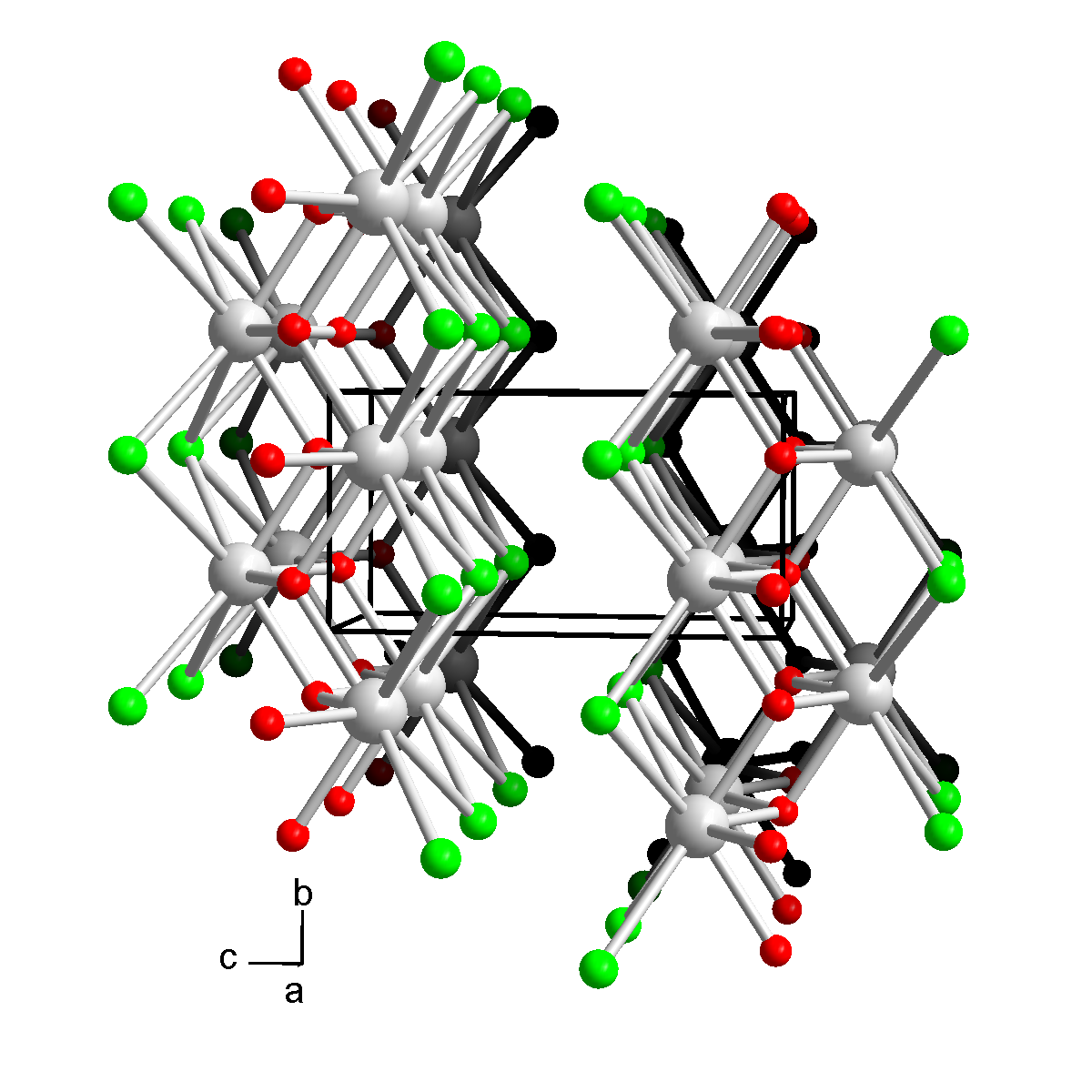

Names
- Other names Bismuth oxide iodide Bismuth iodide oxide Bismuthyl iodide

Identifiers
CAS Number	7787-63-5
3D model (JSmol)	Interactive image
ChemSpider	21170828
ECHA InfoCard	100.029.206
PubChem CID	21863085
UNII	LFR582VS4X
CompTox Dashboard (EPA)	DTXSID401316462
- InChI: InChI=1S/Bi.HI.O/h;1H;/q+3;;-2/p-1 Key: ORZGULPODBRYCV-UHFFFAOYSA-M
- SMILES: I[Bi]=O

Properties
Chemical formula	BiIO
Molar mass	351.88 g·mol^{−1}
Appearance	brick red solid
Density	8.0 g·cm^{−3}
Boiling point	300 °C (573 K) (decomposes)
- Except where otherwise noted, data are given for materials in their standard state (at 25 °C [77 °F], 100 kPa). Infobox references

Bismuth oxyiodide is an inorganic compound, an oxyiodide of bismuth, with the chemical formula BiOI.

== Preparation ==
Bismuth oxyiodide can be obtained by reacting bismuth(III) oxide with hydroiodic acid:

$$\mathrm{Bi_2 O_3 + 2 \ HI \longrightarrow 2 \ BiOI + H_2 O}$$

It can also be obtained by reacting bismuth nitrate pentahydrate and potassium iodide in ethylene glycol at 160 °C in a reactor. The aqueous solution of bismuth nitrate acidified with nitric acid is adjusted by sodium hydroxide and then added dropwise with potassium iodide to obtain the reaction product, and other proportions of oxyiodides will also be produced according to different adjustments.

== Properties ==
Bismuth oxyiodide forms a brick red crystalline powder or copper-colored crystals. It is insoluble in water and ethanol, is only slightly attacked by water even when heated, and melts with decomposition when red hot. It has a tetragonal crystal structure (isotypical with bismuth oxychloride) with space group P4/nmm (No. 129).
