= Bismuth perchlorate =

Names
- IUPAC name Bismuth triperchlorate
- Other names Bismuth(III) perchlorate

Identifiers
| CAS Number | 14059-45-1 |
| 3D model (JSmol) | Interactive image |
| ChemSpider | 23349723 |
| ECHA InfoCard | 100.034.441 |
| EC Number | 237-901-5 |
| PubChem CID | 44146570 |
- InChI: InChI=1S/Bi.3ClHO4/c;3*2-1(3,4)5/h;3*(H,2,3,4,5)/q+3;;;/p-3 Key: VDQDGCAHVVNVDM-UHFFFAOYSA-K
- SMILES: [Bi+3].[O-]Cl(=O)(=O)=O.[O-]Cl(=O)(=O)=O.[O-]Cl(=O)(=O)=O

Properties
| Chemical formula | Bi(ClO_{4})_{3} |
| Molar mass | 507.33 g/mol |
- Except where otherwise noted, data are given for materials in their standard state (at 25 °C [77 °F], 100 kPa). Infobox references

Bismuth perchlorate is an inorganic compound of bismuth and perchloric acid with the formula Bi(ClO_{4})_{3}. It contains bismuth in the +3 oxidation state. Both anhydrous bismuth perchlorate and hydrated forms are known; the normal hydrated salt has been isolated as the pentahydrate, Bi(ClO_{4})_{3}·5H_{2}O. Bismuth perchlorate undergoes extensive hydrolysis in aqueous solution, producing oxo- and hydroxo-bismuth species.

== Preparation ==
Bismuth perchlorate pentahydrate can be prepared by dissolving bismuth(III) oxide in concentrated perchloric acid. Crystallization from 70% perchloric acid gives the pentahydrate.

Bi_{2}O_{3} + 6 HClO_{4} → 2 Bi(ClO_{4})_{3} + 3 H_{2}O

Anhydrous bismuth perchlorate has been prepared by reacting anhydrous bismuth(III) chloride with anhydrous perchloric acid at approximately 25 °C.

BiCl_{3} + 3 HClO_{4} → Bi(ClO_{4})_{3} + 3 HCl

Direct reaction of metallic bismuth with concentrated perchloric acid is unsuitable as a preparative method because violent explosive reactions have been reported on heating.

== Properties ==
=== Hydrolysis and aqueous chemistry ===
Bismuth perchlorate is readily hydrolyzed. One solid product of hydrolysis is bismuthyl perchlorate, BiOClO_{4}, which can be obtained by hydrolysis of bismuth perchlorate in moderately concentrated perchloric acid.

Bi(ClO_{4})_{3} + H_{2}O → BiOClO_{4} + 2 HClO_{4}

The chemistry in solution is more complicated than this overall reaction suggests. Bismuth(III) undergoes hydrolysis even in strongly acidic aqueous media, forming polynuclear oxo-hydroxo species. In perchlorate solutions, the [Bi_{6}O_{4}(OH)_{4}]^{6+} ion becomes significant as the acidity decreases; hydrolysis was detected even in solutions containing an excess strong-acid concentration of about 1 mol dm^{−3}.

In sufficiently acidic aqueous perchlorate solution, the hydrated Bi^{3+} ion is approximately eight-coordinate. EXAFS and large-angle X-ray scattering measurements gave a mean Bi–O distance of 2.41 ± 0.01 Å (241 ± 1 pm). Raman spectroscopy of acidified bismuth perchlorate solutions gives a polarized band near 393 cm^{−1}, assigned to the symmetric Bi–O stretching vibration of the hydrated bismuth(III) ion.

=== Complex formation ===
Addition of hydrochloric acid to bismuth perchlorate solutions causes the hydrated bismuth(III) ions to be replaced progressively by chloro complexes. Raman studies have identified species including BiCl_{4}^{−}, BiCl_{5}^{2−} and BiCl_{6}^{3−} at increasing chloride concentrations. In a bismuth perchlorate solution containing a large excess of hydrochloric acid, the 393 cm^{−1} Bi–O band disappears and a new polarized Raman band appears at 266.5 cm^{−1}, consistent with formation of chlorobismuth complexes.

Bismuth perchlorate also forms well-defined solvates with oxygen-donor solvents. The crystalline dimethyl sulfoxide complex [Bi(DMSO)_{8}](ClO_{4})_{3} contains eight-coordinate bismuth in a distorted square-antiprismatic environment, with a mean Bi–O distance of about 2.43 Å (243 pm). In the corresponding complex with N,N′-dimethylpropyleneurea, [Bi(DMPU)_{6}](ClO_{4})_{3}, bismuth is six-coordinate with an approximately octahedral arrangement and a mean Bi–O distance of 2.324 ± 0.005 Å (232.4 ± 0.5 pm).
