= Bismuth bronze =

Copper alloy

Bismuth bronze or bismuth brass is a copper alloy which typically contains 1-3% bismuth by weight, although some alloys contain over 6% bismuth. This bronze alloy is very corrosion-resistant, a property which makes it suitable for use in environments such as the ocean. Bismuth bronzes and brasses are more malleable, thermally conductive, and polish better than regular brasses. The most common industrial application of these metals is as bearings; however, the material has been in use since the late nineteenth century as kitchenware and mirrors. Bismuth bronze was also found in ceremonial Inca knives at Machu Picchu. Recently, pressure for the substitution of hazardous metals has increased and with it bismuth bronze is being marketed as a green alternative to leaded bronze bearings and bushings.

== History ==
The earliest known artefact containing bismuth bronze is an Inca knife from Peru, found in 1912, dated to AD 1476-1534, and formed from an alloy of 78% copper, 18% bismuth, and 3% tin. Whether the alloy was chosen because of metallurgical properties which facilitated casting or because of its whiter, more lustrous finish is a matter of conjecture. It is unlikely that the inclusion of the bismuth was accidental, as was likely the case for most other early bronzes which contained bismuth, which makes this the earliest evidence of intentional addition of bismuth to an alloy.

Bismuth was conflated with lead or tin until its first definitive identification by Claude François Geoffroy in 1753. Bismuth bronze was intentionally alloyed in the 1880s by James Webster for telegraph wires. Webster developed two bismuth-tin-bronze alloys. One alloy was developed as an early attempt at producing corrosion-resistant bronze, and was described as "hard, tough, and sonorous." Webster also indicated that this particular alloy was also well suited to piano wires. Another early Webster alloy was described as "durable and bright" and later used in kitchenware due to its luster and slow tarnishing. This particular alloy's ability to hold polish made it useful as a light reflector or mirror material as well, which it continued to be used for into the twentieth century

In the 1990s, autoparts manufacturer Federal Mogul began developing bismuth bronzes as an alternative to lead-containing bronzes because of increasing pressure on the removal of lead from both consumer and industrial applications. Bismuth is a non-toxic heavy metal, and as legislation such as the EU Restriction of Hazardous Substances or the American Reduction of Lead in Drinking Water Act continue to regulate the amount of lead that can be in a product or environment, more lead-free alternative materials have been developed which maintain properties of their lead predecessors without containing lead. Bismuth is an especially appropriate replacement for lead leaded bronze bearings because, like lead, bismuth is insoluble in copper and forms similar micro-globules that mimic lead.

== Characteristics ==
=== Structure ===
Modern "bismuth bronze" is technically neither an alloy nor a bronze, but a composite material containing brass and bismuth (though some bronzes are still used). Because bismuth, like lead, is insoluble in copper, it exists as discrete micro-globules of bismuth within the grain boundaries of the alloy which behave as bismuth particles. These particles deform easily within the crystal structure and across the surface of the metal to act as a low-shear solid lubricant in cases of low lubrication. Selenium is added to red copper-bismuth alloys because it strengthens properties of the bismuth of the material. Because liquid bismuth can lead to embrittlement in an alloy, care must be taken in processing and recycling of these materials.

=== Properties ===
Modern bismuth bronzes on the market are developed to hold similar properties to leaded bronzes, and many of them bear nearly identical mechanical properties to common leaded alloys, such as machinability and high thermal conductivity. They also have a high lubricity, which makes them ideal for outer layers in machine parts which are subject to wear such as bearings and swashplates. Bismuth-tin bronze is not easily corroded by water; preliminary bismuth is not easily oxidized.

Used in faucets, pump components, pipe fittings, plumbing goods, water pump impellers, housings and small gears, Alloy C89835 Bismuth-Tin Bronze has density 0.321 lb/in^{3}, while Alloy C89844 (which is used for fittings or valves for potable water) has a density of 0.31 lb/in^{3}.

=== Applications ===
Originally, bismuth-tin bronze was developed for telegraph wires. However, in the late nineteenth and early twentieth century, the bronze became more commonly used in mirrors, reflectors, kitchenware, and piano wires. It fell out of common use in the first half of the twentieth century.

Modern bismuth bronze alloys are marketed as a green alternative to lead, often chosen over the less expensive leaded bronzes because of environmental regulation. They are found as a surface layer on automotive or mechanical components which receive heavy wear such as hydraulic piston pumps. These alloys are also commonly used in bearings or bushes in tribologic systems. Also, some bismuth-bronze plumbing fittings are manufactured.

== Processing ==
=== Casting ===
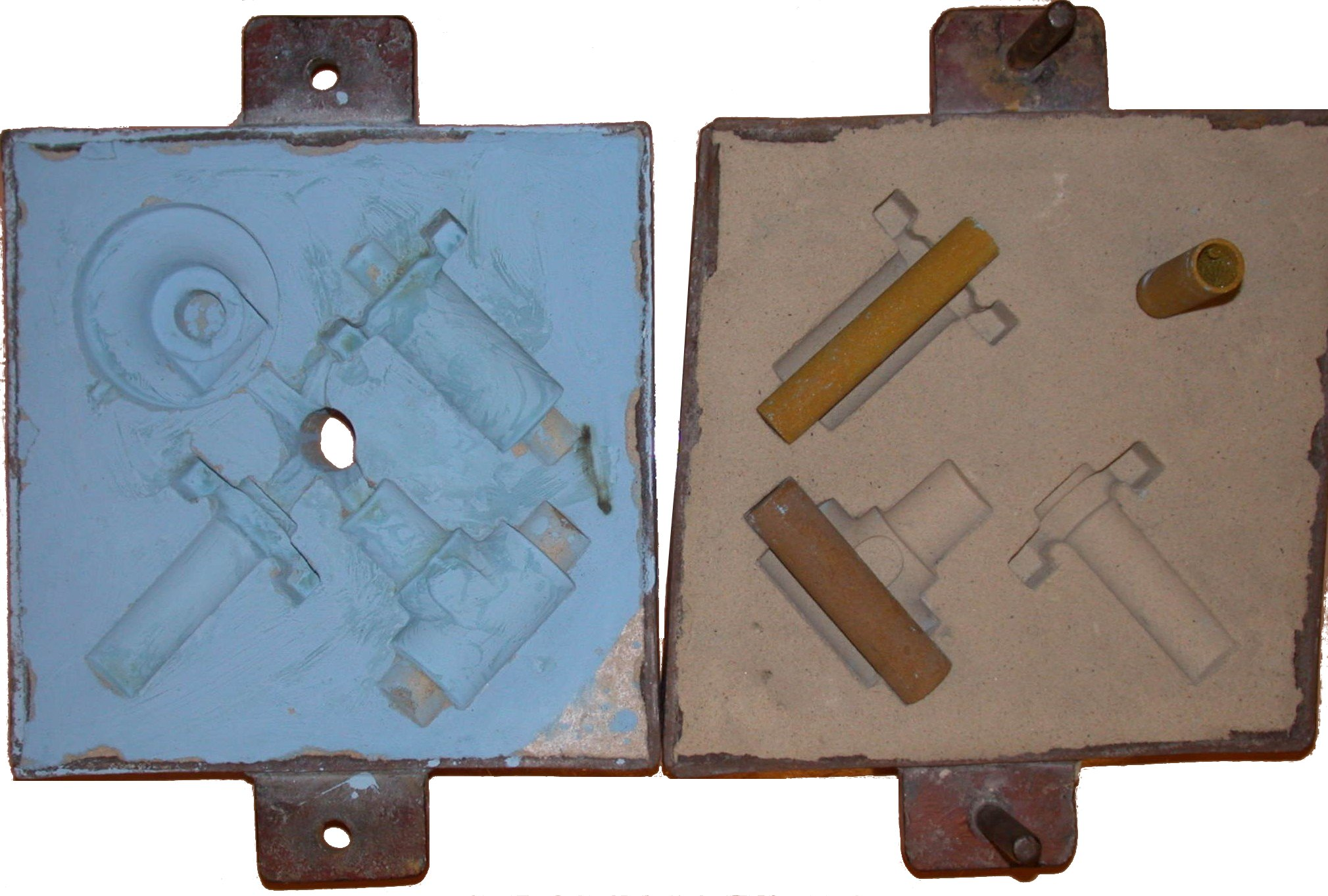
Cope & drag (top and bottom halves of a sand mold), with cores in place on the drag

Lead-free bismuth bronze castings are produced by frozen molds. Sand characteristics are used to increase the rate of cooling of the bronze castings because the sand particles have a higher thermal conductivity, greater grain size and spherical shape. The mold has a high cooling potential. When the mold is frozen, the ice near the surface contracts to molten metal and thaws immediately.

=== Extruding and annealing ===
Another way bismuth brass can be processed includes the extrusion brass rod through machining to form the material into a desired shape. The material is then annealed to relieve stress that was caused by the machining. The material is annealed at a certain annealing temperature and time depending on the material’s composition. The time is selected to limit diffusional movement of bismuth. This reduces cracking of the fixture.

Aluminium hot extrusion die. Similar to the brass extrusion dies.

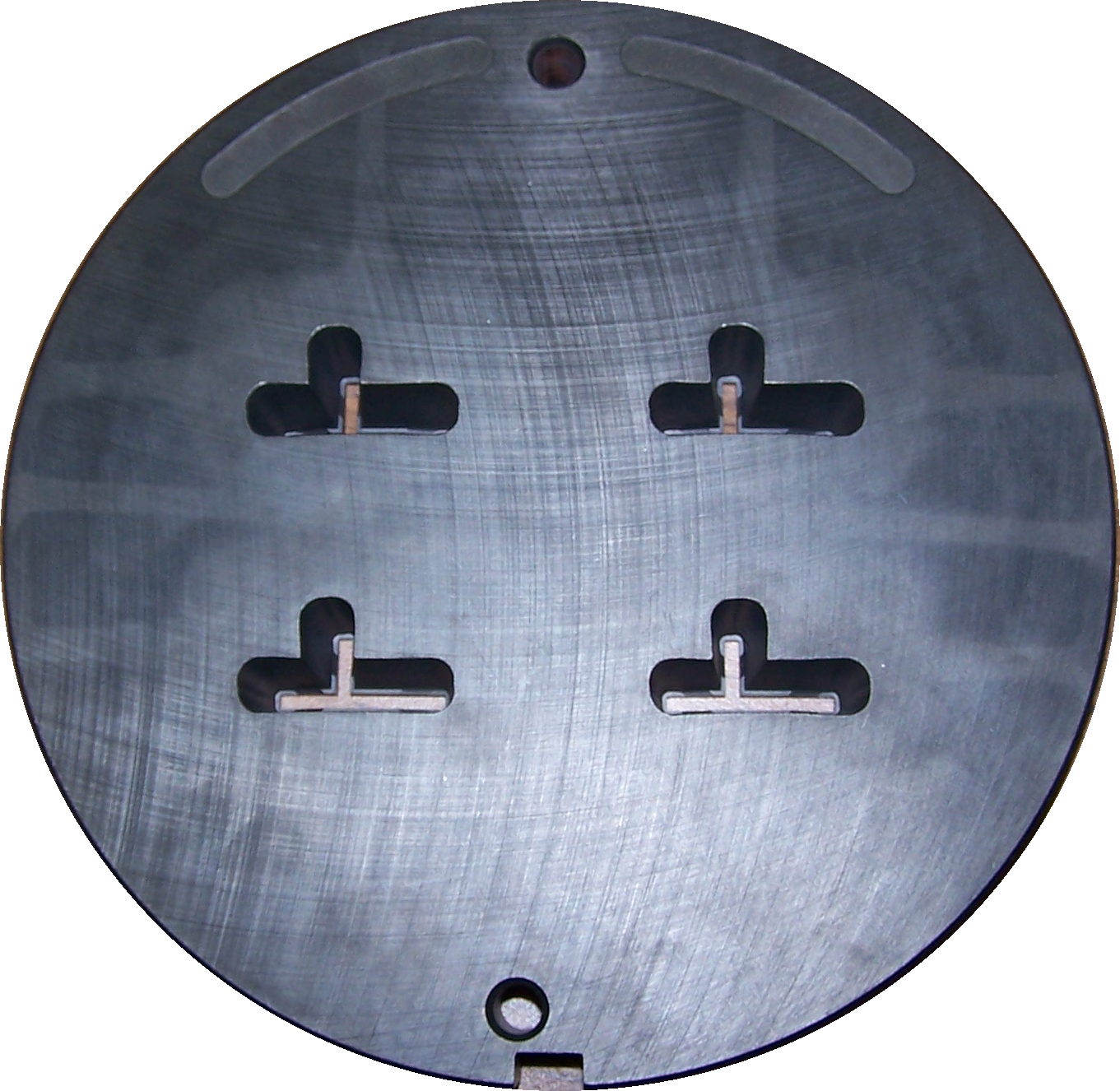
Front side of a four family die. For reference, the die is 228 mm (9.0 in) in diameter.

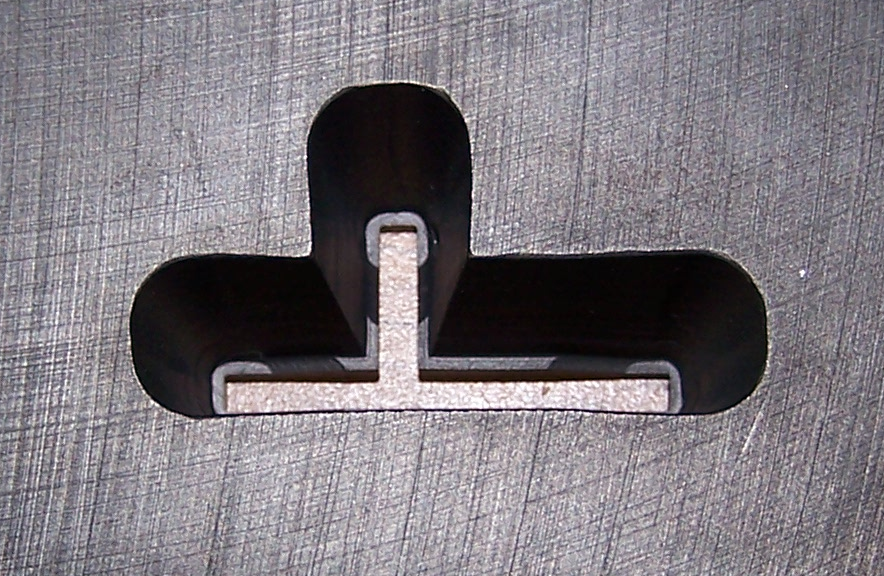
Close up of the shape cut into the die. Notice that the walls are drafted and that the back wall thickness varies.

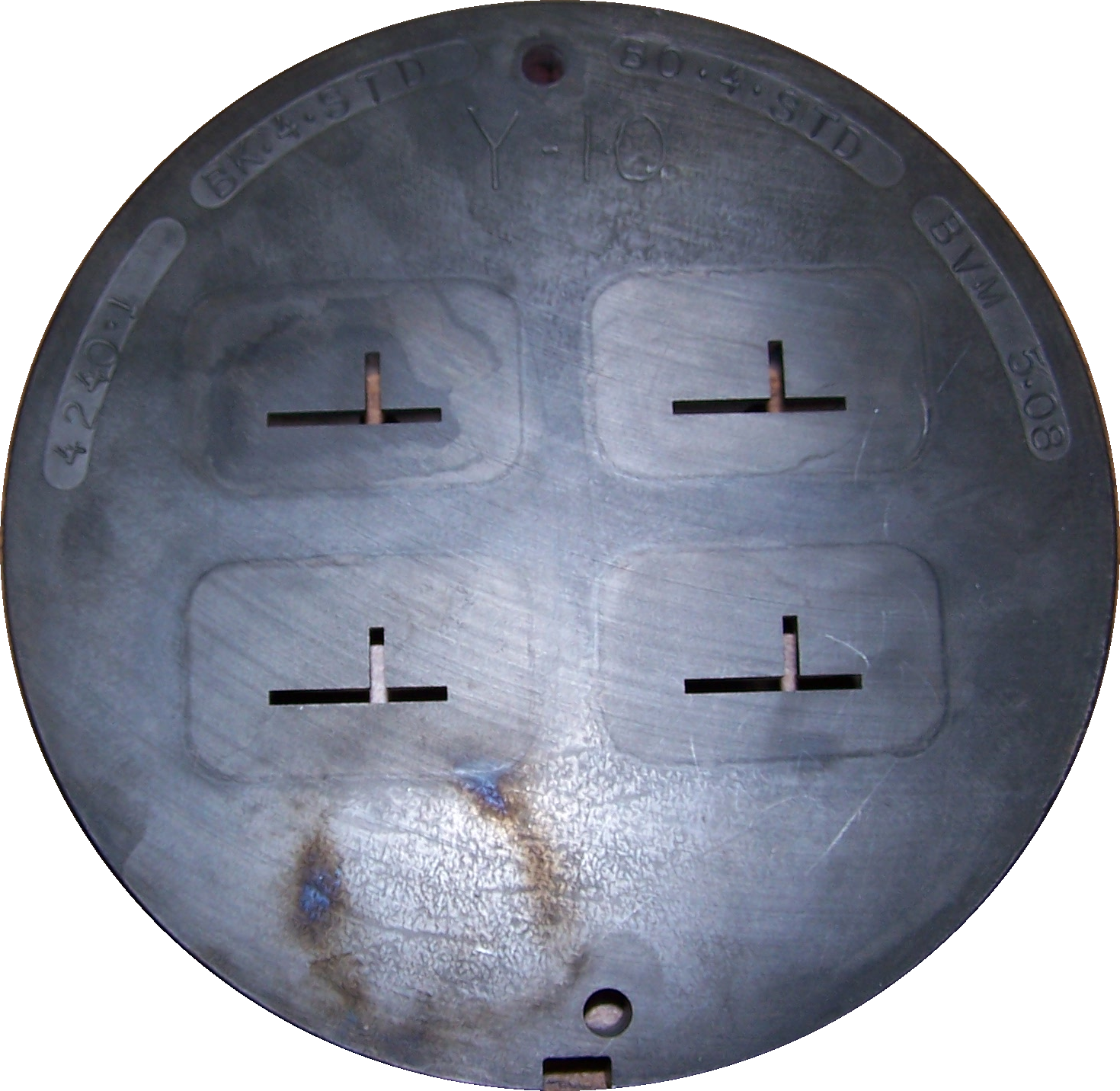
Back side of die. The wall thickness of the extrusion is 3 mm (0.12 in).

=== Water atomization ===
High-pressure water atomization is a processing method of bismuth brass. This is a way of rapidly solidifying the metal alloy. A liquid metal is dispersed into droplets by the impingement of high-pressure jets of water. It is a low-cost process to achieve a distribution of fine particles in iron, stainless steel, and low-alloy metal powders. This is a way of rapidly solidifying the metal alloy. A limitation of water atomization is the powder purity. For metals that are inclined to oxidation, this is a major problem.
