= Bismuth iodate =

Identifiers
CAS Number	13702-39-1 anhydrous; dihydrate: 945228-38-6
3D model (JSmol)	Interactive image; dihydrate: Interactive image
ChemSpider	2283066
ECHA InfoCard	100.033.834
EC Number	237-233-4
PubChem CID	3014773
CompTox Dashboard (EPA)	DTXSID20160034
- InChI: InChI=1S/Bi.3HIO3/c;3*2-1(3)4/h;3*(H,2,3,4)/q+3;;;/p-3 Key: FGQDLCIITXBKAR-UHFFFAOYSA-K; dihydrate: InChI=1S/Bi.3HIO3.2H2O.6H/c;3*2-1(3)4;;;;;;;;/h;3*(H,2,3,4);2*1H2;;;;;;/q+3;;;;;;;;;;;/p-3 Key: ZXENQEZTERBKRJ-UHFFFAOYSA-K
- SMILES: [Bi+3].[O-][I](=O)=O.[O-][I](=O)=O.[O-][I](=O)=O; dihydrate: [Bi+3].[O-][I](=O)=O.[O-][I](=O)=O.[O-][I](=O)=O.O.O

Properties
Chemical formula	Bi(IO_{3})_{3}
Molar mass	733.69
Appearance	colourless crystals (dihydrate)
Density	6.096 g (anhydrous)
- Except where otherwise noted, data are given for materials in their standard state (at 25 °C [77 °F], 100 kPa). Infobox references

Bismuth iodate is an inorganic compound with the chemical formula Bi(IO_{3})_{3}. Its anhydrate can be obtained by reacting bismuth nitrate and iodic acid, dissolving the resulting precipitate in 7.8 mol/L nitric acid, and heating to volatilize and crystallize at 70 °C; The dihydrate can be obtained by reacting bismuth nitrate and potassium iodate or sodium iodate. It is obtained by evaporation and crystallization in 7 mol/L nitric acid at 50 °C. Its basic salt BiOIO_{3} is known.
