= Hopper crystal =

Form of a crystal that resembles a hopper container

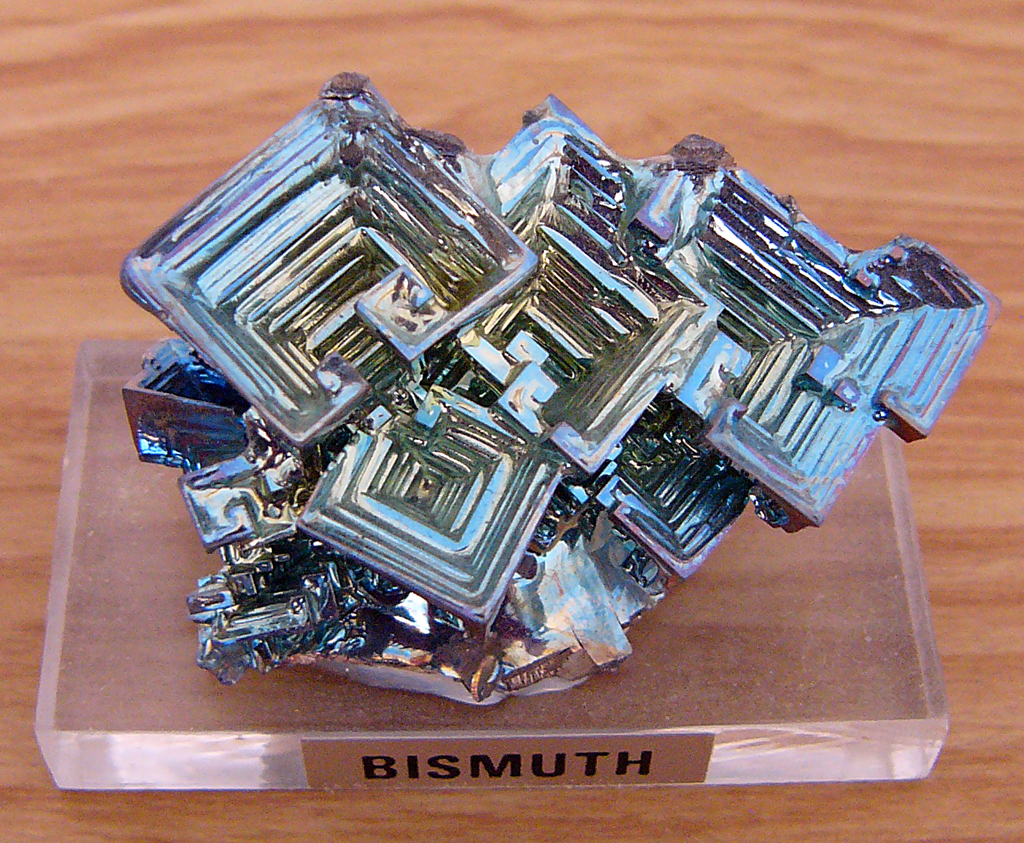
A possibly synthetic bismuth hopper crystal

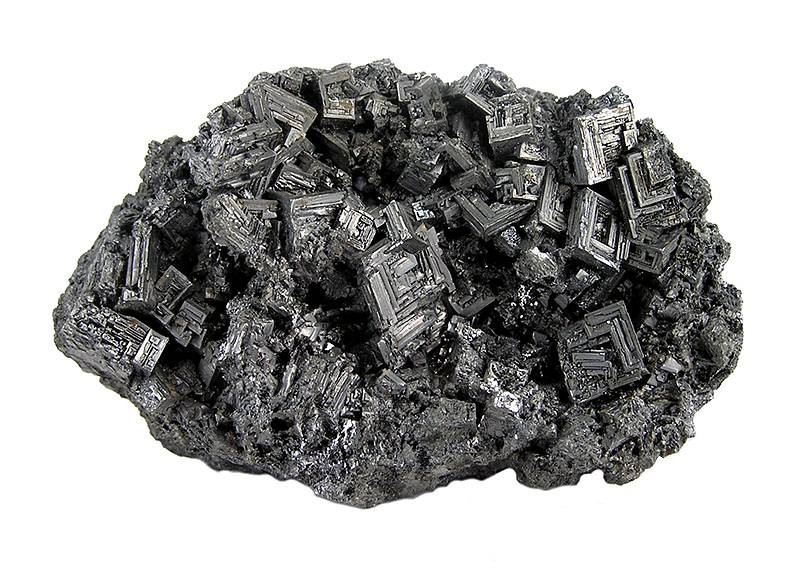
Hoppered galena

A hopper crystal is a form of crystal, the shape of which resembles that of a pyramidal hopper container.

The edges of hopper crystals are fully developed, but the interior spaces are not filled in. This results in what appears to be a hollowed-out step lattice formation, as if someone had removed interior sections of the individual crystals. In fact, the "removed" sections never filled in, because the crystal was growing so rapidly that there was not enough time (or material) to fill in the gaps. The interior edges of a hopper crystal still show the crystal form characteristic to the specific mineral, and so appear to be a series of smaller and smaller stepped down miniature versions of the original crystal.

Hoppering occurs when electrical attraction is higher along the edges of the crystal; this causes faster growth at the edges than near the face centers. This attraction draws the mineral molecules more strongly than the interior sections of the crystal, thus the edges develop more quickly. However, the basic physics of this type of growth is the same as that of dendrites but, because the anisotropy in the solid–liquid interfacial energy is so large, the dendrite so produced exhibits a faceted morphology.

Hoppering is common in many minerals, including lab-grown bismuth, galena, quartz (called skeletal or fenster crystals), gold, calcite, halite (salt), and water (ice).

In 2017, Frito-Lay filed for (and later received) a patent for a salt cube hopper crystal. Because the shape increases surface area to volume, it allows people to taste more salt compared to the amount actually consumed.
