= Bismuth subgallate =

Chemical compound

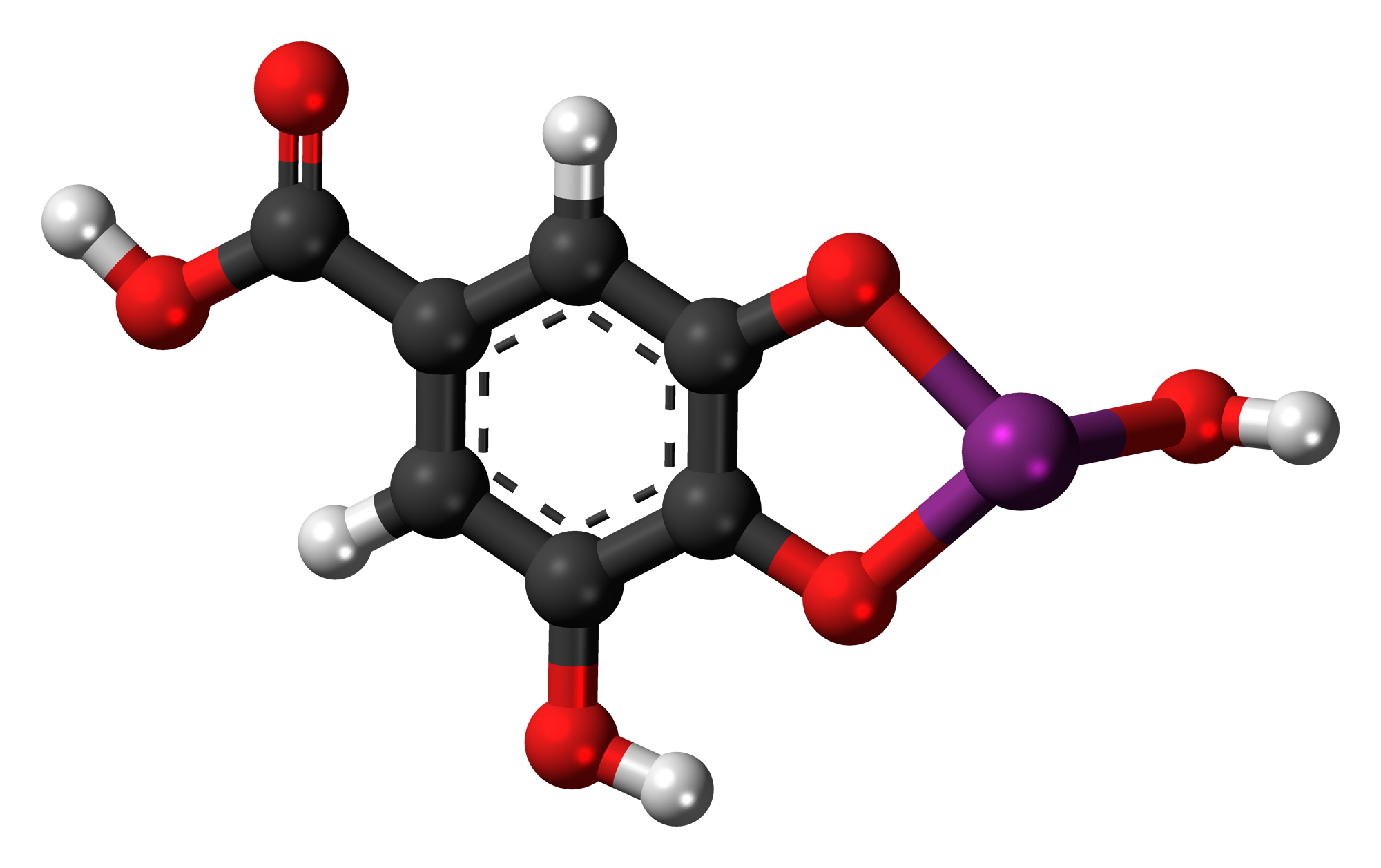

Clinical data
- AHFS/Drugs.com: International Drug Names
- Routes of administration: Oral
- ATC code: A07BB (WHO)

Legal status
- Legal status: US: OTC

Identifiers
- IUPAC name: 2,7-dihydroxy-1,3,2-benzodioxabismole-5-carboxylic acid
- CAS Number: 99-26-3
- PubChem CID: 16682999
- DrugBank: DB13909
- ChemSpider: 10607905
- UNII: YIW503MI7V
- ChEBI: CHEBI:31292
- CompTox Dashboard (EPA): DTXSID3046588
- ECHA InfoCard: 100.002.493

Chemical and physical data
- Formula: C_{7}H_{5}BiO_{6}
- Molar mass: 394.091 g·mol^{−1}
- 3D model (JSmol): Interactive image
- Density: 1.1 g/cm^{3}
- SMILES: OC(=O)c2cc1O[Bi](O)Oc1c(O)c2
- InChI: InChI=1S/C7H6O5.Bi.H2O/c8-4-1-3(7(11)12)2-5(9)6(4)10;;/h1-2,8-10H,(H,11,12);;1H2/q;+3;/p-3; Key:JAONZGLTYYUPCT-UHFFFAOYSA-K

Bismuth subgallate, with a chemical formula C_{7}H_{5}BiO_{6}, is commonly used to treat malodor by deodorizing flatulence and stools. In the United States, it (bismuth subgallate) is the active ingredient in Devrom (internal deodorant), an over-the-counter FDA-approved medicine. Also, it has been used to treat Helicobacter pylori infection and is used in wound therapy. As an internal deodorant, it is commonly used by individuals who have had gastrointestinal stoma surgery, bariatric surgery, fecal incontinence, and irritable bowel syndrome.

Also, a double blind study in 1974 reported its effectiveness as a flatulence/stool deodorant in ileostomy patients.

== Adverse effects ==
It can cause darkening of the tongue and stools, which is temporary.

In 1974, a reversible encephalopathy was noted and examined in four colon cancer patients taking bismuth subgallate after abdominoperineal resection.

Bismuth subgallate is contraindicated in case of hypersensitivity to the substance, and should be used with caution in people with liver disease or kidney disease. It is grouped in pregnancy category C (risk not ruled out: Animal reproduction studies have shown an adverse effect on the fetus and there are no adequate and well-controlled studies in humans, but potential benefits may warrant use of the drug in pregnant women despite potential risks). During lactation, very little bismuth subgallate passes over to the child.

== Structure ==
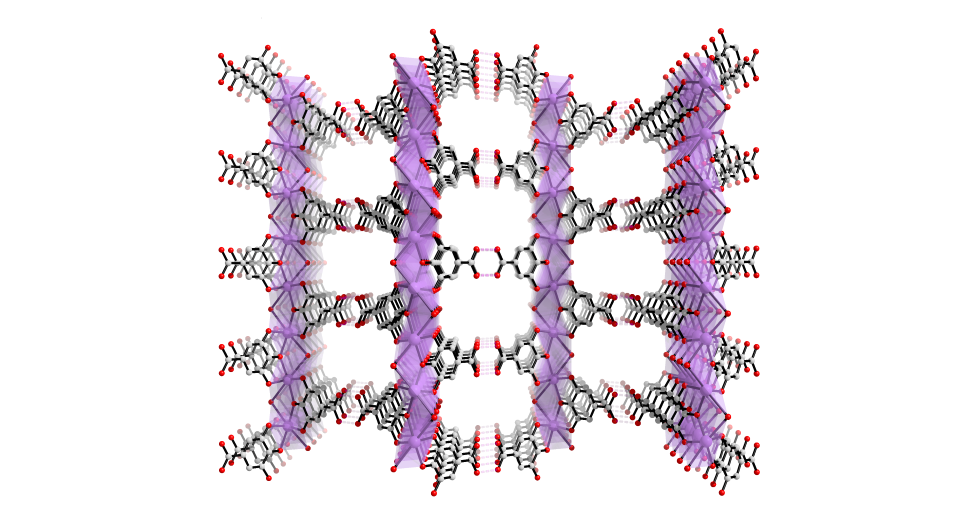
The crystal structure of bismuth subgallate.

Crystal structure determination of bismuth subgallate revealed it is a coordination polymer with the formula [Bi(C_{6}H_{2}(O)_{3}COOH)(H_{2}O)]_{n}2nH_{2}O. The phenolate oxygen atoms of the gallate ligand chelate to bismuth cations and form chains. The material is nanoporous and the open-channels can be filled with small gas molecules such as carbon dioxide.

== See also ==
- Bismuth
- Gallic acid
