= Bismuthide =

The bismuthide ion is Bi^{3−} but the term is often used to describe less reduced forms of bismuth.

Bismuthides are compounds of bismuth with more electropositive elements. A wide variety are known.

The stoichiometry of bismuthides ranges from lithium bismuthide (Li_{3}Bi), which can be viewed as the Li^{+} salt of Bi^{3-}. The corresponding sodium and potassium derivatives are also known. They all prepared by heating the elements.

In terms of Bi-rich phases, examples are LiBi, KBi_{2}, CaBi_{3}, which exhibit strong Bi-Bi bonding. Some are intermetallic compounds, containing partially metallic and partially ionic bonds. The majority of bismuthides adopt efficient packing arrangements and become densely packed structures, which is a characteristic of intermetallic compounds.

== See also ==
- Bismanol, a magnetic alloy of bismuth and manganese
- Zintl phase
