= Bismuthyl (ion) =

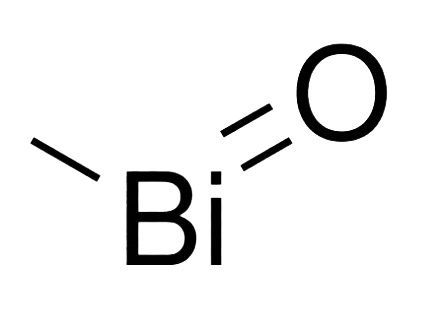
- Bismuthyl (structural formula)

Identifiers
CAS Number	62905-81-1
3D model (JSmol)	Interactive image
ChemSpider	4406792
PubChem CID	5237718
CompTox Dashboard (EPA)	DTXSID30412298
- InChI: InChI=1S/Bi.O/q+1; Key: AFQPDONMRFOLIJ-UHFFFAOYSA-N
- SMILES: [Bi+]=O

Properties
Chemical formula	BiO^{+}
Molar mass	224.979 g·mol^{−1}
- Except where otherwise noted, data are given for materials in their standard state (at 25 °C [77 °F], 100 kPa). Infobox references

Bismuthyl is an inorganic oxygen-containing singly charged ion with the chemical formula BiO^{+}. In inorganic chemistry bismuthyl has been used to describe compounds such as BiOCl which were assumed to contain the bismuthyl cation, and it was also presumed to exist in aqueous solution. This diatomic ion is not now believed to exist. Unlike other inorganic radicals such as hydroxyl, carbonyl, chromyl, uranyl or vanadyl, according to the current IUPAC rules, the name bismuthyl for BiO^{+} is not recommended, since individual molecules of these groups are not identifiable but atomic layers of Bi and O. Their presence in compounds preferably should be referred to as oxides.

== In the history of chemistry ==
Until the last quarter of the 20th century, the real existence of the bismuthyl ion was not in doubt; it was fully present in all reference books and manuals on inorganic chemistry, including German and English ones. The most famous compound of this class was considered bismuthyl chloride, the chemical properties of which were studied in detail and were considered titular for all other bismuth compounds. In addition, the compound with the calculation formula BiOCl exists in nature in the form of bismoclite, one of the secondary metamorphosed minerals from the class of halides.

== In mineralogy and geochemistry ==
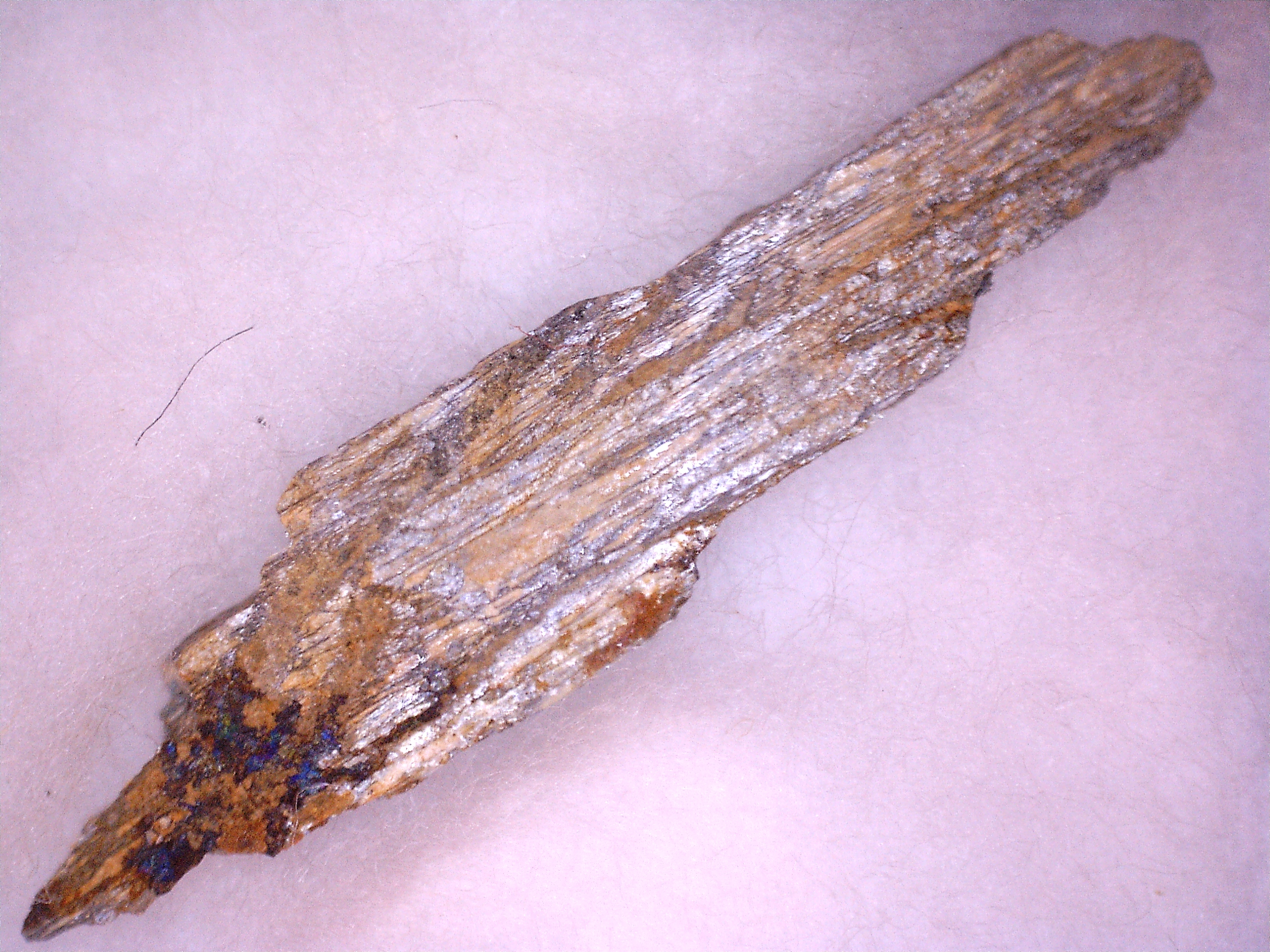
Bismoclite (Brazil)

Previously, it was believed that bismuthyl plays almost the main role in the geochemistry of bismuth and metamorphic processes taking place in a liquid medium. Already in ore waters, bismuth and its main compounds are oxidized, forming a sparingly soluble oxychloride — bismoclite, which, when mixed with bicarbonate background waters, is replaced by an even more sparingly soluble — bismuthite. As a result, small amounts of bismuth circulate in both ore and background waters precisely in the form of bismuthyl ion.

The migration of bismuth in neutral and slightly alkaline groundwater in the form of a simple bismuth ion is hindered as a result of the low threshold pH for the precipitation of its hydroxide from solution. According to thermodynamic calculations carried out in the late 1960s for the stability fields of native bismuth, bismuthinite, bismuth oxides and bismuthyl chloride, in the pH–Eh coordinates the main ion form of bismuth migration was the bismuthyl ion BiO^{+}. According to calculations, it occupied a leading place in the metabolic and oxidative processes that constantly take place in the erosion zones of bismuth minerals.

Bismuthyl chloride, along with BiONO_{3} nitrate, which was originally considered the title compound of this cation, actually exists in nature in the form of bismoclite, one of the secondary metamorphosed minerals from the class of halides. According to the chemical formula conventionally recognized back in the 19th century, bismoclite consisted precisely of bismuthyl cations (BiO^{+}) and chlorine anions (Cl^{–}). Thus, previously the chemical composition of this mineral was traditionally called bismuthyl chloride. However, by the end of the 20th century, based on the results of targeted chemical analyses, the reality of the existence of the diatomic bismuthyl ion was called into question. Since then, bismoclite has been characterized as bismuth oxide-chloride (oxychloride). In the same way, it was proposed to rename all similar bismuthyl compounds, primarily the remaining halides (from fluoride to iodide) and nitrate.

== See also ==
- Bismuthyl
- Bismuthyl chloride
- Bismuthyl carbonate
- Bismuthyl nitrate
- Bismoclite
