= Bismuth(III) nitrate =

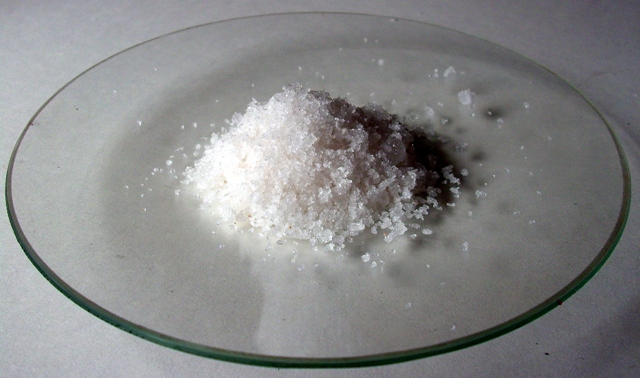

Names
- Other names Bismuth trinitrate, Bismuth(III) nitrate pentahydrate

Identifiers
CAS Number	anhydrous: 10361-44-1; pentahydrate: 10035-06-0
3D model (JSmol)	anhydrous: Interactive image
ChemSpider	anhydrous: 96880; pentahydrate: 141368
ECHA InfoCard	100.030.707
EC Number	anhydrous: 600-076-0
PubChem CID	anhydrous: 107711; pentahydrate: 160911
UNII	anhydrous: 4R459R54N0; pentahydrate: FO2ICY167B
CompTox Dashboard (EPA)	anhydrous: DTXSID30883121
- InChI: anhydrous: InChI=1S/Bi.3NO3/c;3*2-1(3)4/q+3;3*-1 Key: PPNKDDZCLDMRHS-UHFFFAOYSA-N
- SMILES: anhydrous: [N+](=O)([O-])[O-].[N+](=O)([O-])[O-].[N+](=O)([O-])[O-].[Bi+3]

Properties
Chemical formula	Bi(NO_{3})_{3}·5H_{2}O
Molar mass	485.07 g/mol (pentahydrate)
Appearance	colorless, white
Density	2.90 g/cm^{3} (pentahydrate)
Solubility in water	Decomposes to form bismuth oxynitrate
Solubility	Slightly soluble in acid
Magnetic susceptibility (χ)	−91.0·10^{−6} cm^{3}/mol

Hazards
- GHS labelling
Pictograms	(GHS03: Oxidizing) (GHS07: Exclamation mark) (GHS09: Environmental hazard)
Signal word	Warning
Hazard statements	H272, H315, H319, H335, H411
Precautionary statements	P210, P220, P221, P261, P264, P271, P273, P280, P302+P352, P304+P340, P305+P351+P338, P312, P321, P332+P313, P337+P313, P362, P370+P378, P391, P403+P233, P405, P501
- Except where otherwise noted, data are given for materials in their standard state (at 25 °C [77 °F], 100 kPa). Infobox references

Bismuth(III) nitrate is a salt composed of bismuth in its cationic +3 oxidation state and nitrate anions. The most common solid form is the pentahydrate. It is used in the synthesis of other bismuth compounds. It is available commercially. It is the only nitrate salt formed by a group 15 element, indicative of bismuth's metallic nature.

== Preparation and reactions ==
Bismuth nitrate can be prepared by the reaction of bismuth metal and concentrated nitric acid.

Bi + 4HNO_{3} → Bi(NO_{3})_{3} + 2H_{2}O + NO

It dissolves in nitric acid but is readily hydrolysed to form a range of oxynitrates when the pH increases above 0.

It is also soluble in acetone, acetic acid and glycerol but practically insoluble in ethanol and ethyl acetate.

Some uses in organic synthesis have been reported for example the nitration of aromatic compounds and selective oxidation of sulfides to sulfoxides.

Bismuth nitrate forms insoluble complexes with pyrogallol and cupferron and these have been the basis of gravimetric methods of determining bismuth content.

On heating bismuth nitrate can decompose forming nitrogen dioxide, NO_{2}.

== Structure ==
The crystal form is triclinic, and contains 10 coordinate Bi^{3+}, (three bidentate nitrate ions and four water molecules).
