= Claude François Geoffroy =

French chemist (1729–1753)

Claude François Geoffroy (1729 – 18 June 1753) was a French chemist. In 1753 he proved the chemical element bismuth to be distinct from lead, becoming the official discoverer of the element. Before this time, bismuth-containing minerals were frequently misidentified as either lead, tin, or antimony ores. His observations on the matter were published in the Mémoires de l’académie française in 1753.

He became a master apothecary in 1748, and in 1752 he was admitted to the Académie des sciences as a supernumerary adjoint chemist. He died on 18 June 1753, (age 23 or 24).

He is known as Claude Geoffroy the Younger to distinguish him from his father Claude Joseph Geoffroy the Older (1685–1752), also a French chemist and apothecary, member of the Académie des sciences.
