= Bismuth oxychloride =

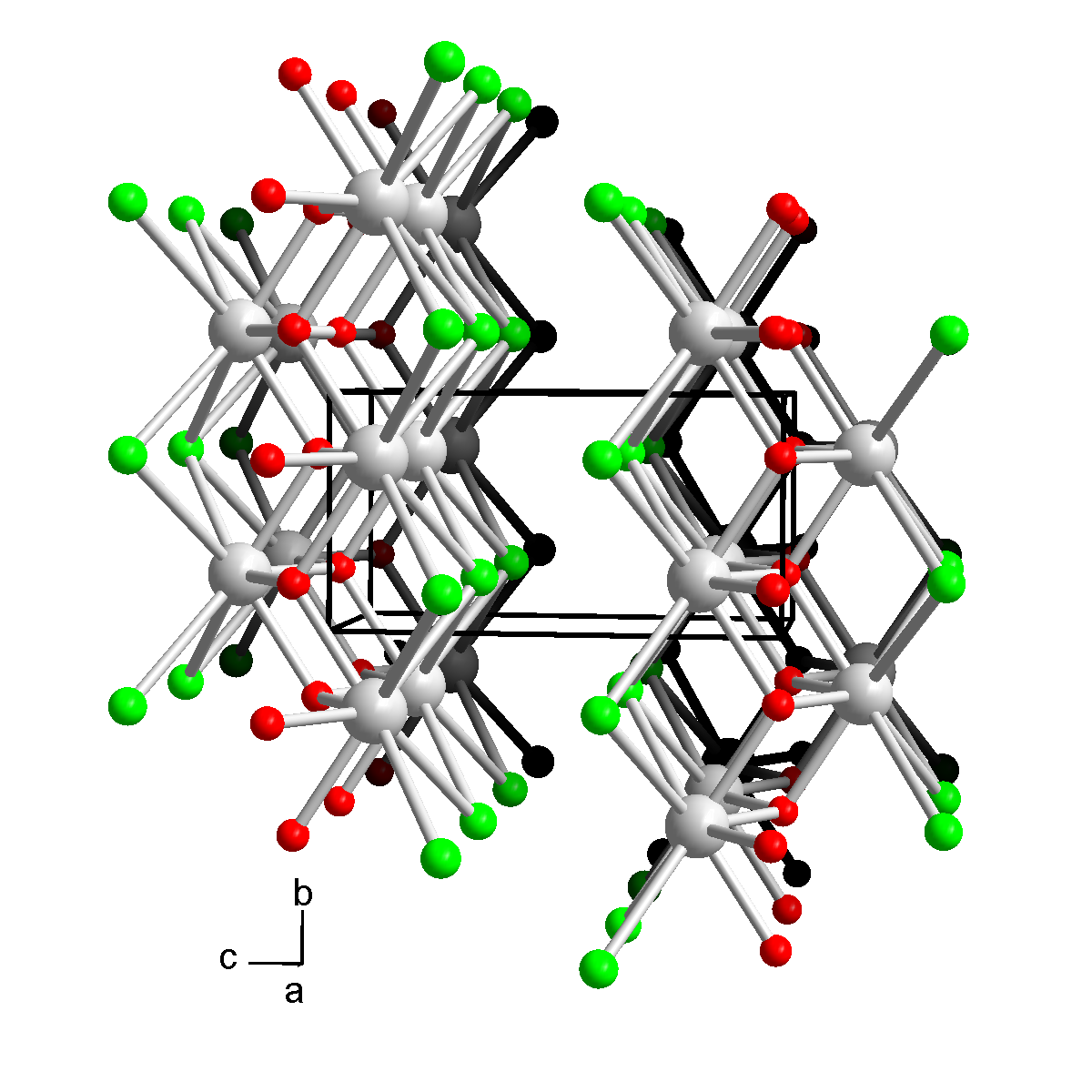

Names
- Other names bismuthyl chloride bismuth oxochloride bismuth oxide chloride bismuth(III) oxide chloride bismoclite

Identifiers
CAS Number	7787-59-9
3D model (JSmol)	Interactive image
ChemSpider	10606415
ECHA InfoCard	100.029.202
EC Number	232-122-7
PubChem CID	6328152
UNII	4ZR792I587
CompTox Dashboard (EPA)	DTXSID2020181
- InChI: InChI=1S/Bi.ClH.O/h;1H;/q+1;;/p-1 Key: GLQBXSIPUULYOG-UHFFFAOYSA-M; InChI=1/Bi.ClH.O/h;1H;/q+1;;/p-1/rBiClO/c2-1-3 Key: GLQBXSIPUULYOG-JKOFJLRAAJ
- SMILES: Cl[Bi]=O

Properties
Chemical formula	BiOCl
Molar mass	260.43 g·mol^{−1}
Appearance	Lustrous white crystals with a pearly iridescent light reflectivity
Density	7.36 g/cm^{3} (measured); 7.78 g/cm^{3} (calculated)
Solubility in water	negligible
Solubility	soluble in acids

Structure
Crystal structure	Tetragonal, tP6
Space group	P4/nmm, No. 129
Lattice constant	a = 0.3887 nm, c = 0.7354 nm

Hazards
- GHS labelling
Pictograms	(GHS07: Exclamation mark)
Signal word	Warning
Hazard statements	H315, H319, H335
Precautionary statements	P261, P264, P271, P280, P302+P352, P304+P340, P305+P351+P338, P312, P321, P332+P313, P337+P313, P362, P403+P233, P405, P501
- Except where otherwise noted, data are given for materials in their standard state (at 25 °C [77 °F], 100 kPa). verify (what is ?) Infobox references

Bismuth oxychloride is an inorganic compound of bismuth with the formula BiOCl. It is a lustrous white solid used since antiquity, notably in ancient Egypt. Light wave interference from its plate-like structure gives a pearly iridescent light reflectivity similar to nacre. Previously, until the last decade of the twentieth century, bismuth oxochloride was known as bismuthyl chloride. It is also known as pigment pearl white.

== Structure ==
The structure of bismuth oxychloride has a tetragonal symmetry that can be thought of as consisting of layers of Cl^{−}, Bi^{3+} and O^{2−} ions (in the image Bi = grey, O = red, Cl = green). These ions are ordered as Cl–Bi–O–Bi–Cl–Cl–Bi–O–Bi–Cl, i.e., with alternating anions (Cl^{−}, O^{2−}) and cations (Bi^{3+}). The layered structure gives rise to the pearlescent properties and the relatively low hardness of this material.

Focusing on the coordination environment of the individual ions, the bismuth centers adopt a distorted square antiprismatic coordination geometry. The Bi atom is coordinated to four Cl atoms, forming one of the square faces, each at a distance of 3.06 Å from Bi, and four O atoms forming the other square face, each at a distance of 2.32 Å from Bi. The O atoms are tetrahedrally coordinated by four Bi atoms.

== Synthesis and reactions ==
BiOCl is formed during the reaction of bismuth chloride with water, i.e. the hydrolysis:

BiCl_{3} + H_{2}O → BiOCl + 2 HCl

When heated above 600 °C, BiOCl converts to Bi_{24}O_{31}Cl_{10}, called the "Arppe compound" which has a complex layer structure.

== Use and occurrence ==
It has been used in cosmetics since the days of ancient Egypt. It is part of the "pearly pigment found in eye shadow, hair sprays, powders, nail polishes, and other cosmetic products". Owing to the plate-like structure of the BiOCl, its suspensions exhibit optical properties like nacre. In cosmetic its name is C.I. 77163.

BiOCl exists in nature as the rare mineral bismoclite, which is part of the matlockite mineral group.

An analogous compound, bismuth oxynitrate, is used as a white pigment.
