= Bismuthyl =

Bismuthyl means a chemical species formally derived from the element bismuth and can refer to substituents bonded to the rest of a molecule through a bismuth atom, including:

- derivatives of bismuthanes, BiR_{3}, such as the diphenylbismuthyl group, Ph_{2}Bi–, found in the ion [Ph_{2}Bi−(Ge_{9})−BiPh_{2}]^{2−}
- trivalent bismuth species when considered as ligands, such as the tribromobismuthyl ligand, Br_{3}Bi→

In inorganic chemistry bismuthyl has been used to describe compounds such as BiOCl which were assumed to contain the diatomic bismuthyl, BiO^{+}, cation, that was also presumed to exist in aqueous solution. This diatomic ion is not now believed to exist.
