= Bismuth =

Bismuth, _{83}Bi
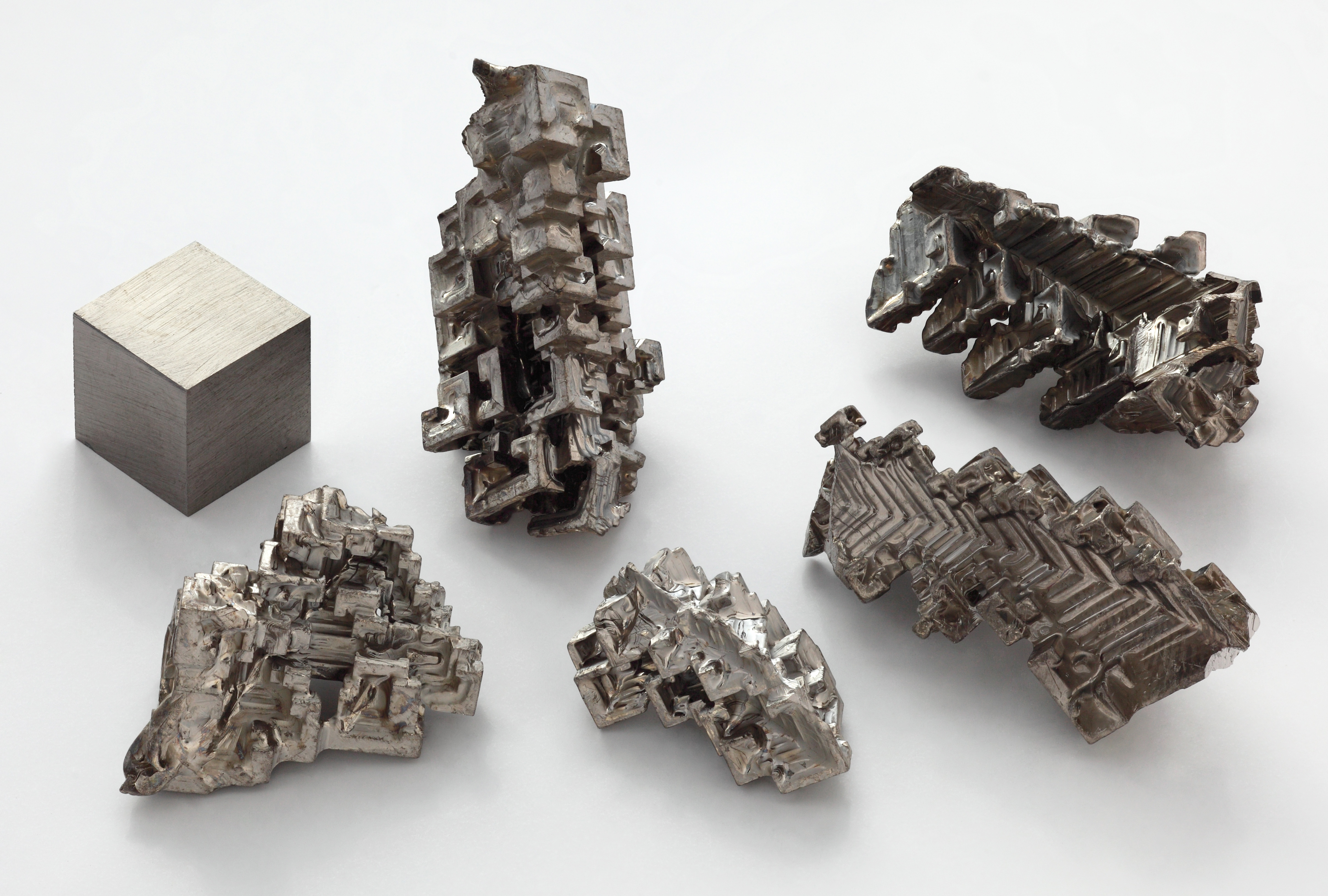

Bismuth
- Pronunciation: /ˈbɪzməθ/ (BIZ-məth)
- Appearance: lustrous brownish silver

Standard atomic weight A_{r}°(Bi)
- 208.98040±0.00001; 208.98±0.01 (abridged)

Bismuth in the periodic table
Hydrogen																															Helium
Lithium	Beryllium																									Boron	Carbon	Nitrogen	Oxygen	Fluorine	Neon
Sodium	Magnesium																									Aluminium	Silicon	Phosphorus	Sulfur	Chlorine	Argon
Potassium	Calcium															Scandium	Titanium	Vanadium	Chromium	Manganese	Iron	Cobalt	Nickel	Copper	Zinc	Gallium	Germanium	Arsenic	Selenium	Bromine	Krypton
Rubidium	Strontium															Yttrium	Zirconium	Niobium	Molybdenum	Technetium	Ruthenium	Rhodium	Palladium	Silver	Cadmium	Indium	Tin	Antimony	Tellurium	Iodine	Xenon
Caesium	Barium	Lanthanum	Cerium	Praseodymium	Neodymium	Promethium	Samarium	Europium	Gadolinium	Terbium	Dysprosium	Holmium	Erbium	Thulium	Ytterbium	Lutetium	Hafnium	Tantalum	Tungsten	Rhenium	Osmium	Iridium	Platinum	Gold	Mercury (element)	Thallium	Lead	Bismuth	Polonium	Astatine	Radon
Francium	Radium	Actinium	Thorium	Protactinium	Uranium	Neptunium	Plutonium	Americium	Curium	Berkelium	Californium	Einsteinium	Fermium	Mendelevium	Nobelium	Lawrencium	Rutherfordium	Dubnium	Seaborgium	Bohrium	Hassium	Meitnerium	Darmstadtium	Roentgenium	Copernicium	Nihonium	Flerovium	Moscovium	Livermorium	Tennessine	Oganesson
Sb
↑
Bi
↓
Mc
lead ← bismuth → polonium
- Atomic number (Z): 83
- Group: group 15 (pnictogens)
- Period: period 6
- Block: p-block
- Electron configuration: [Xe] 4f^{14} 5d^{10} 6s^{2} 6p^{3}
- Electrons per shell: 2, 8, 18, 32, 18, 5

Physical properties
- Phase at STP: solid
- Melting point: 544.7 K (271.5 °C, 520.7 °F)
- Boiling point: 1837 K (1564 °C, 2847 °F)
- Density (at 20° C): 9.807 g/cm^{3}
- when liquid (at m.p.): 10.05 g/cm^{3}
- Heat of fusion: 11.30 kJ/mol
- Heat of vaporization: 179 kJ/mol
- Molar heat capacity: 25.52 J/(mol·K)
- Specific heat capacity: 122.117 J/(kg·K)
Vapor pressure
P (Pa)	1	10	100	1 k	10 k	100 k
at T (K)	941	1041	1165	1325	1538	1835

Atomic properties
- Oxidation states: common: +3 −3, −2, −1, +1, +2, +4, +5
- Electronegativity: Pauling scale: 2.02
- Ionization energies: 1st: 703 kJ/mol; 2nd: 1610 kJ/mol; 3rd: 2466 kJ/mol; (more)
- Atomic radius: empirical: 156 pm
- Covalent radius: 148±4 pm
- Van der Waals radius: 207 pm
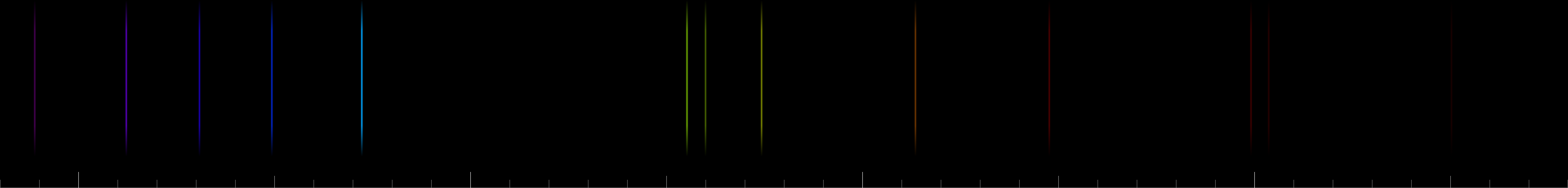
- Spectral lines of bismuth

Other properties
- Natural occurrence: primordial
- Crystal structure: rhombohedral (hR2)
- Lattice constants: a = 0.47458 nm α = 57.236° a_{h} = 0.45462 nm c_{h} = 1.18617 nm (at 20 °C)
- Thermal expansion: 13.09×10^{−6}/K (at 20 °C) (Note: The thermal expansion is anisotropic: the coefficients for each crystal axis (at 20 °C) are α_{ah} = 11.26×10^{−6}/K, α_{ch} = 16.74×10^{−6}/K, and α_{average} = α_{volume}/3 = 13.09×10^{−6}/K.)
- Thermal conductivity: 7.97 W/(m⋅K)
- Electrical resistivity: 1.29 µΩ⋅m (at 20 °C)
- Magnetic ordering: diamagnetic
- Molar magnetic susceptibility: −280.1×10^{−6} cm^{3}/mol
- Young's modulus: 32 GPa
- Shear modulus: 12 GPa
- Bulk modulus: 31 GPa
- Speed of sound thin rod: 1790 m/s (at 20 °C)
- Poisson ratio: 0.33
- Mohs hardness: 2.25
- Brinell hardness: 70–95 MPa
- CAS Number: 7440-69-9

History
- Naming: possibly from German Wismuth, itself perhaps from weiße Masse, "white mass"
- Discovery: Arabic alchemists (before AD 1000)

Isotopes of bismuth
Main isotopes			Decay	
Isotope	abundance	half-life (t_{1/2})	mode	product
^{207}Bi	synth	31.22 y	β^{+}	^{207}Pb
^{208}Bi	synth	3.68×10^{5} y	β^{+}	^{208}Pb
^{209}Bi	100%	2.01×10^{19} y	α	^{205}Tl
^{210}Bi	trace	5.012 d	β^{−}	^{210}Po
^{210}Bi	trace	5.012 d	α	^{206}Tl
^{210m}Bi	synth	3.04×10^{6} y	α	^{206}Tl

Bismuth is a chemical element; it has symbol Bi and atomic number 83. It is a post-transition metal and one of the pnictogens, with chemical properties resembling its lighter group 15 siblings arsenic and antimony. Elemental bismuth occurs naturally, and its sulfide and oxide forms are important commercial ores. The free element is 86% as dense as lead. It is a brittle metal with a silvery-white color when freshly produced. Surface oxidation generally gives samples of the metal a somewhat rosy cast. Further oxidation under heat can give bismuth a vividly iridescent appearance due to thin-film interference. Bismuth is the most diamagnetic element and of all the metals, it is among the most electrically resistive and least thermally conductive known.

Bismuth was formerly understood to be the element with the highest atomic mass whose nuclei do not spontaneously decay, but in 2003, it was found to be very slightly radioactive. The metal's only primordial isotope, bismuth-209, undergoes alpha decay with a half-life roughly a billion times longer than the estimated age of the universe.

Bismuth metal has been known since ancient times. Before modern analytical methods, bismuth's metallurgical similarities to lead and tin often led it to be confused with those metals. The etymology of "bismuth" is uncertain. The name may come from mid-16th-century neo-Latin translations of the German words weiße Masse or Wismuth, meaning "white mass", which were rendered as bisemutum or bisemutium.

Bismuth compounds account for about half the global production of bismuth. They are used in cosmetics, pigments, and a few pharmaceuticals, notably bismuth subsalicylate can be used to treat diarrhea. Bismuth's unusual propensity to expand as it solidifies is responsible for some of its uses, as in the casting of printing type. Bismuth, when in its elemental form, has unusually low toxicity for a heavy metal. As the toxicity of lead and the cost of its environmental remediation became more apparent during the 20th century, suitable bismuth alloys have gained popularity as replacements for lead. Presently, around a third of global bismuth production is dedicated to needs formerly met by lead.

== History and etymology ==
Bismuth was one of the first 11 metals to have been discovered. The name "bismuth" dates to around 1665 and is of uncertain etymology. The name possibly comes from German Bismuth, Wismut, Wissmuth (early 16th century), perhaps related to Old High German hwiz ("white"). The Neo-Latin bisemutium (coined by Georgius Agricola, who Latinized many German mining and technical words) is from the German Wismuth, itself perhaps from weiße Masse, meaning "white mass".

The element was confused in early times with tin and lead because of its resemblance to those elements. Because bismuth has been known since ancient times, no one person is credited with its discovery. The Incas used bismuth (along with the usual copper and tin) in a special bronze alloy for knives, likely intentionally. Agricola (1546) states that bismuth is a distinct metal in a family of metals including tin and lead. This was based on observation of the metals and their physical properties. Miners in the age of alchemy also gave bismuth the name tectum argenti, or "silver being made" in the sense of silver still in the process of being formed within the Earth.

Alchemical symbol used by Torbern Bergman (1775)

Beginning with Johann Heinrich Pott in 1738, Carl Wilhelm Scheele, and Torbern Olof Bergman, the distinctness of lead and bismuth became clear, and Claude François Geoffroy demonstrated in 1753 that this metal is distinct from lead and tin.

== Characteristics ==
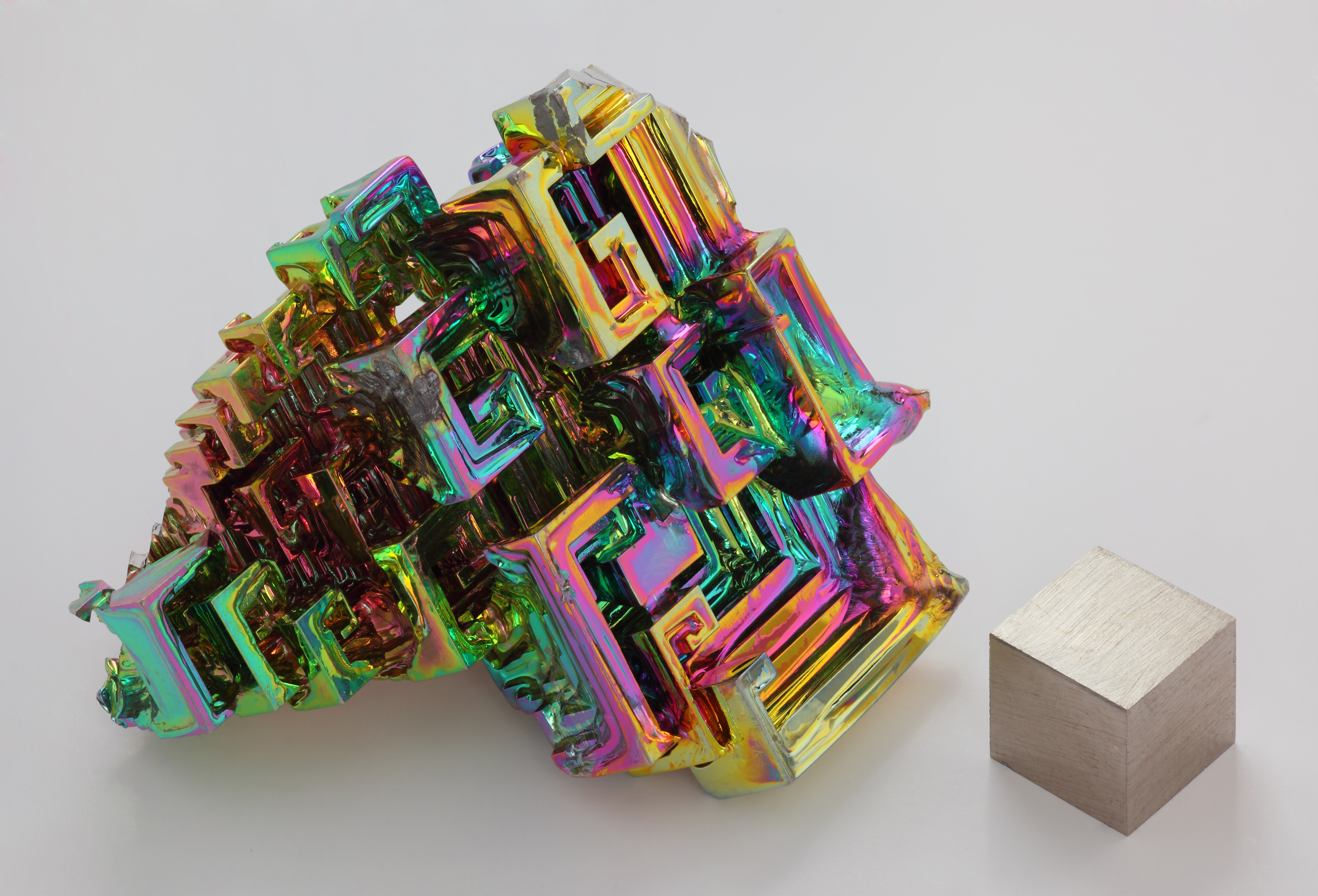
Left: A bismuth hopper crystal is exhibiting the stairstep crystal structure and iridescent colors, which are produced by interference of light within the oxide film on its surface. Right: a 1 cm^{3} cube of unoxidised bismuth metal

=== Physical characteristics ===
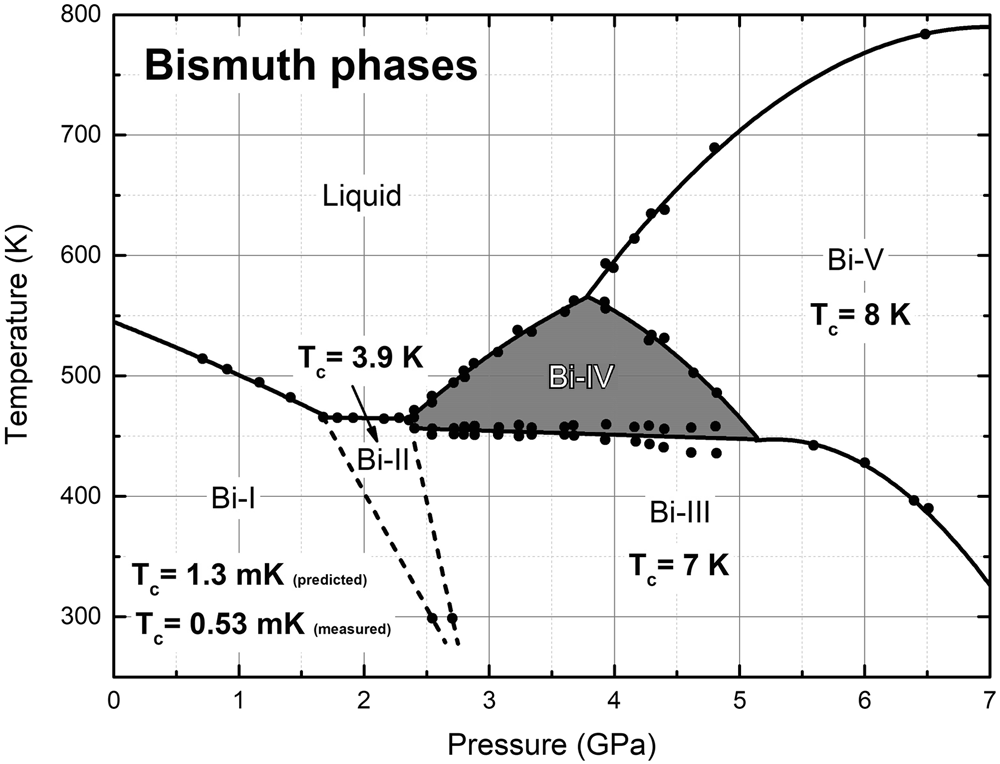
Pressure-temperature phase diagram of bismuth. T_{C} refers to the superconducting transition temperature

Bismuth is a brittle metal with a dark, silver-pink hue, often with an iridescent oxide tarnish showing many colors from yellow to blue. The spiral, stair-stepped structure of bismuth crystals is the result of a higher growth rate around the outside edges than on the inside edges. The variations in the thickness of the oxide layer that forms on the surface of the crystal cause different wavelengths of light to interfere upon reflection, thus displaying a rainbow of colors. When burned in oxygen, bismuth burns with a blue flame and its oxide forms yellow fumes. Its toxicity is much lower than that of its neighbors in the periodic table, such as lead and antimony.

No other metal is verified to be more naturally diamagnetic than bismuth. (Note: Superdiamagnetism is a different physical phenomenon.) Of any metal, it has one of the lowest values of thermal conductivity (after manganese, neptunium, and plutonium) and the highest Hall coefficient. It has the fourth highest electrical resistivity of all the pure metals, only surpassed by gadolinium, manganese and plutonium. (Note: When measured at approximately room temperature.) When deposited in sufficiently thin layers on a substrate, bismuth is a semiconductor, despite being a post-transition metal. Elemental bismuth is denser in the liquid phase than the solid, a characteristic it shares with germanium, silicon, gallium, plutonium, and water. Bismuth expands 3.32% on solidification, so it was long a component of low-melting typesetting alloys, where it compensated for the contraction of the other alloying components to form almost isostatic bismuth-lead eutectic alloys.

Though virtually unseen in nature, high-purity bismuth can form distinctive, colorful hopper crystals. It is relatively nontoxic and has a low melting point just above 267 °C (513 °F), so crystals may be grown using a household stove, although the resulting crystals tend to be of lower quality than laboratory-grown crystals.

At ambient conditions, bismuth shares the same layered structure as the metallic forms of arsenic and antimony, crystallizing in the rhombohedral lattice. When compressed at room temperature, this Bi–I structure changes first to the monoclinic Bi-II at 2.55 GPa, then to the tetragonal Bi-III at 2.7 GPa, and finally to the body-centered cubic Bi-V at 7.7 GPa. The corresponding transitions can be monitored via changes in electrical conductivity; they are rather reproducible and abrupt, so are used for calibration of high-pressure equipment.

=== Chemical characteristics ===
Bismuth is stable to both dry and moist air at ordinary temperatures. At sufficiently high temperatures, it can react with water vapor to make bismuth(III) oxide.

2 Bi + 3 H_{2}O → Bi_{2}O_{3} + 3 H_{2}

It reacts with fluorine to form bismuth(V) fluoride at 500 °C (932 °F) or bismuth(III) fluoride at lower temperatures (typically from Bi melts); with other halogens it yields only bismuth(III) halides. The trihalides are corrosive and easily react with moisture, forming oxyhalides with the formula BiOX.

2 Bi + 3 X_{2} → 2 BiX_{3} (X = F, Cl, Br, I)
BiX_{3} + H_{2}O → BiOX + 2 HX

Bismuth dissolves in concentrated sulfuric acid to make bismuth(III) sulfate and sulfur dioxide.

6 H_{2}SO_{4} + 2 Bi → 6 H_{2}O + Bi_{2}(SO_{4})_{3} + 3 SO_{2}

It reacts with nitric acid to make bismuth(III) nitrate (which decomposes into nitrogen dioxide when heated).

Bi + 6 HNO_{3} → 3 H_{2}O + 3 NO_{2} + Bi(NO_{3})_{3}

It also dissolves in hydrochloric acid, but only with oxygen present.

4 Bi + 3 O_{2} + 12 HCl → 4 BiCl_{3} + 6 H_{2}O

=== Isotopes ===
The only primordial isotope of bismuth, bismuth-209, had long been regarded as the heaviest stable nuclide, but was suspected on theoretical grounds to be unstable to alpha decay. This was finally demonstrated in 2003, when researchers at the Institut d'astrophysique spatiale in Orsay, France, detected this decay; the best value of the half-life is now 2.01×10^{19} years (3 Bq/t), over 10^{9} times longer than the estimated age of the universe. Due to its hugely long half-life, bismuth can be treated as stable for all known medical and industrial applications. The radioactivity is of academic interest because bismuth is one of a few elements whose radioactivity was suspected and theoretically predicted before being detected in the laboratory. Bismuth has the longest known α-decay half-life, though tellurium-128 has the longest known by any mode: double beta decay at about 2.25×10^{24} years.

Six isotopes of bismuth with short half-lives (210–215 inclusive, but not 210m) occur in the natural radioactive decay chains of actinium, radium, thorium, and neptunium, and more have been synthesized. (Though all primordial ^{237}Np has long since decayed, it is continually regenerated by (n,2n) knockout reactions on natural ^{238}U.)

For medical use, bismuth-213 can be produced, as the parent isotope actinium-225, by bombarding radium with bremsstrahlung photons from a linear particle accelerator. In 1997, an antibody conjugate with bismuth-213 (half-life 45.6 minutes, emits alpha particles) was used to treat leukemia patients, and it has been used in other cancer treatment, for example, in the targeted alpha therapy experimental program.

== Chemical compounds ==
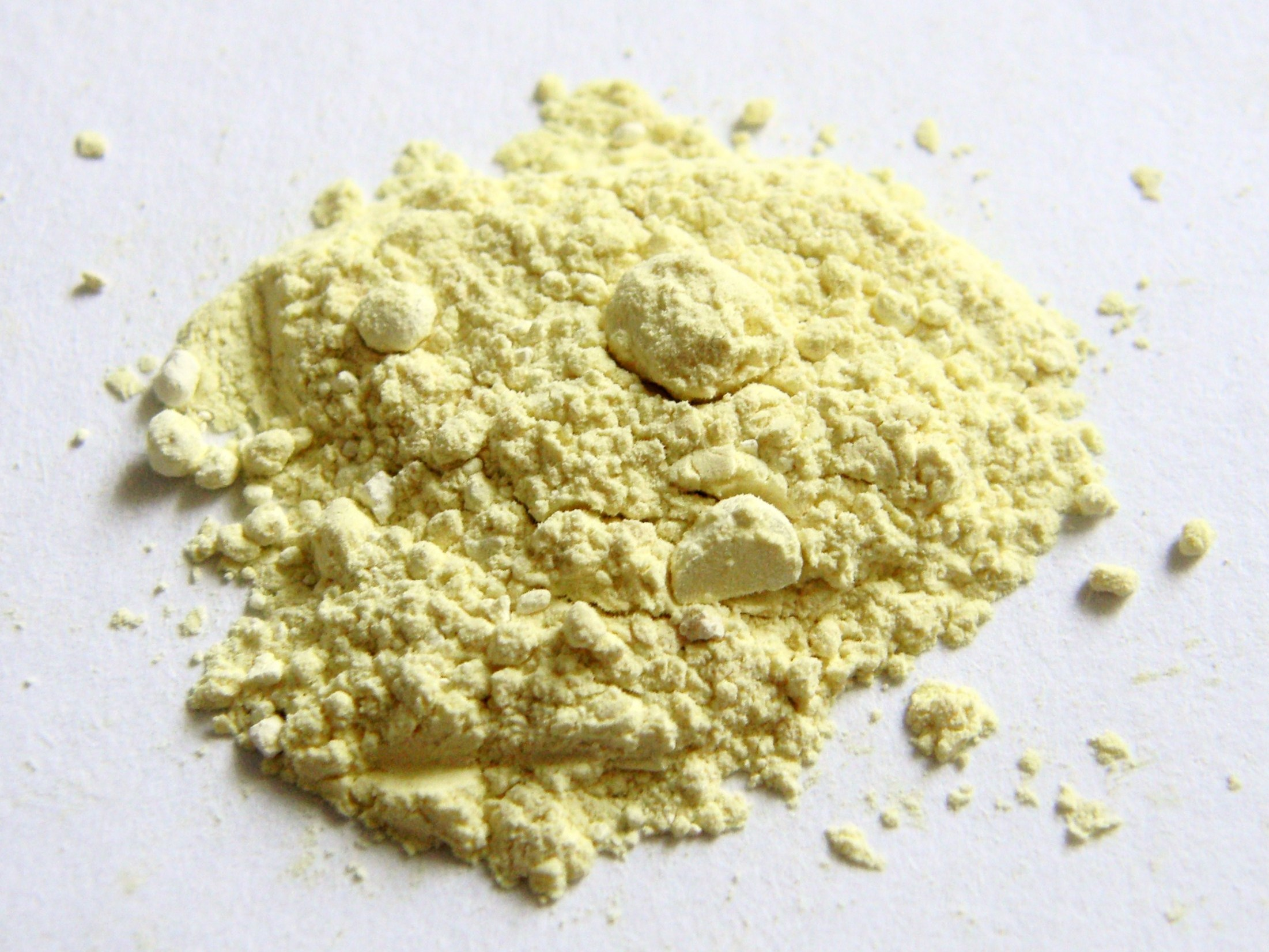
Bismuth(III) oxide powder

Chemically, bismuth resembles arsenic and antimony, but is much less toxic. In almost all known compounds, bismuth has oxidation state +3; a few have states +5 or −3.

The trioxide and trisulfide can both be made from the elements, although the trioxide is extremely corrosive at high temperatures. The pentoxide is not stable at room temperature, and evolves O_{2} gas if heated. Both oxides form complex anions, and NaBiO_{3} is a strong oxidising agent. The trisulfide is common in bismuth ore.

Similarly, bismuth forms all possible trihalides, but the only pentahalide is BiF_{5}. All are Lewis acids. Bismuth forms several formally Bi^{I} halides; these are complex salts with unusually structured polyatomic cations and anions.

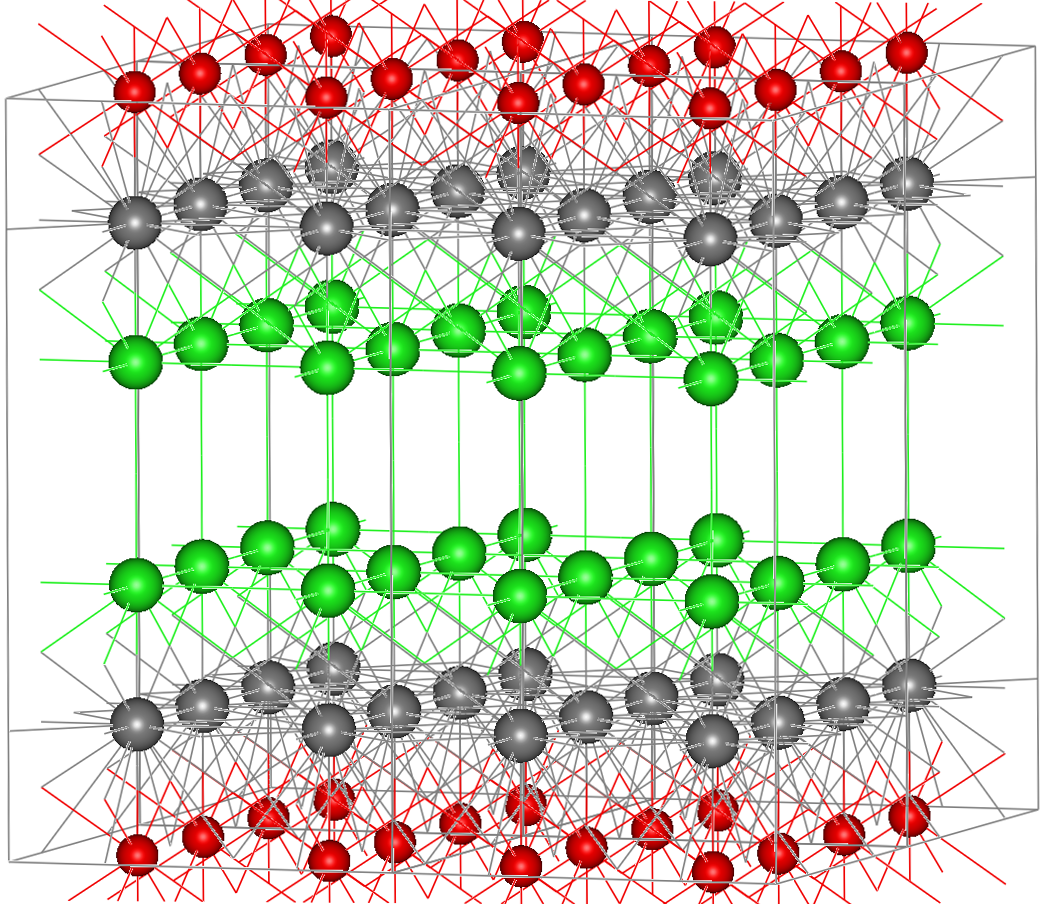
Bismuth oxychloride (BiOCl) structure (mineral bismoclite): Bismuth atoms are shown as grey, oxygen is red, and chlorine is green.

In strongly acidic aqueous solution, the Bi^{3+} ion solvates to form Bi(H_{2}O)^{3+}_{8}. As pH increases, the cations polymerize until the octahedral bismuthyl complex [Bi_{6}O_{4}(OH)_{4}]^{6+}, often abbreviated BiO^{+}. Although bismuth oxychloride and bismuth oxynitrate have stoichiometries suggesting the ion, they are double salts instead. Bismuth nitrate hydrolysys in water, forming oxynitrate.

Bismuth forms very few stable bismuthides, intermetallic compounds in which it attains oxidation state −3. The hydride spontaneously decomposes at room temperature and stabilizes only below −60 °C (−76 °F). Sodium bismuthide has interest as a topological Dirac insulator.

== Occurrence and production ==
=== Production ===
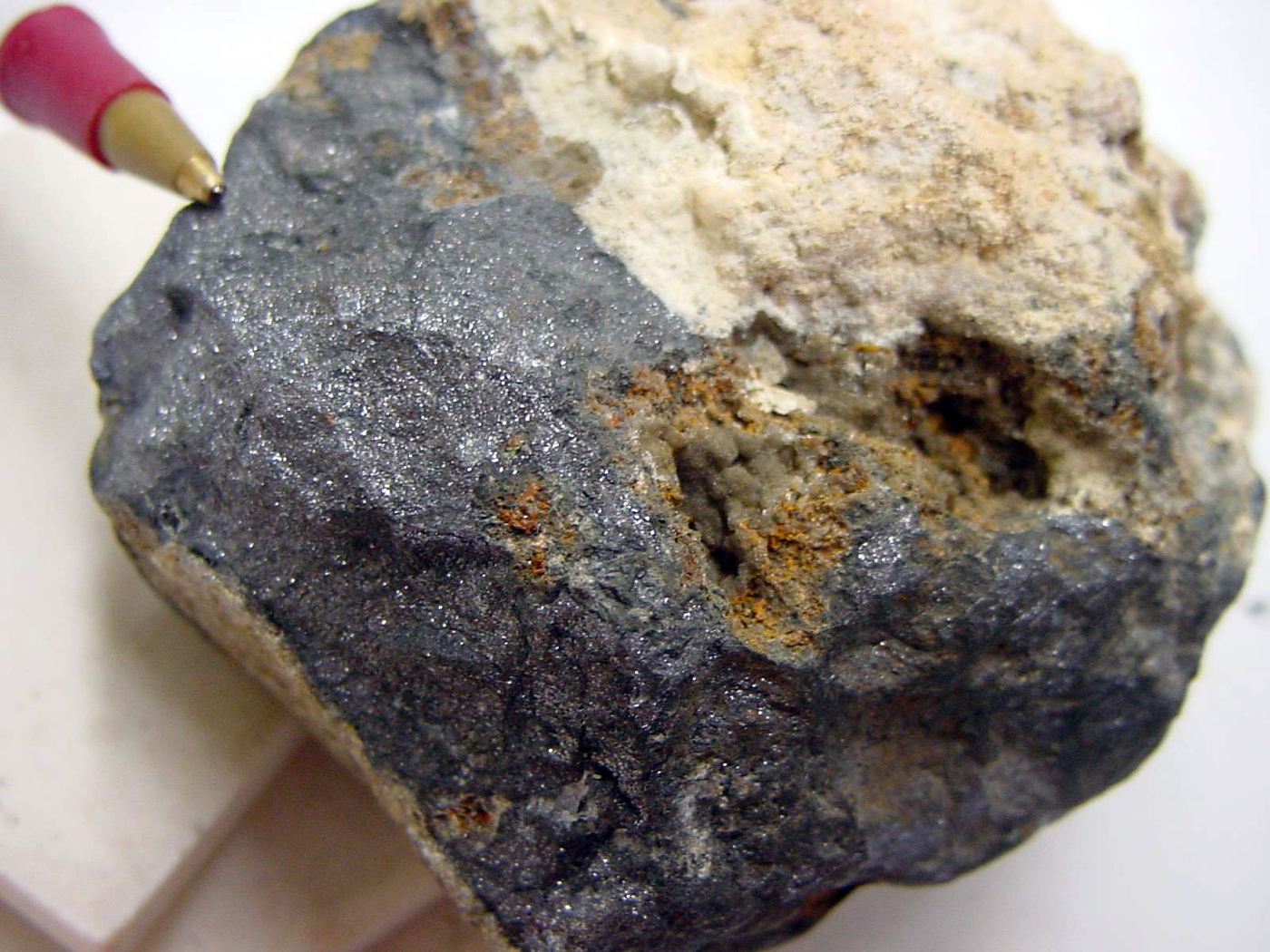
Bismite mineral

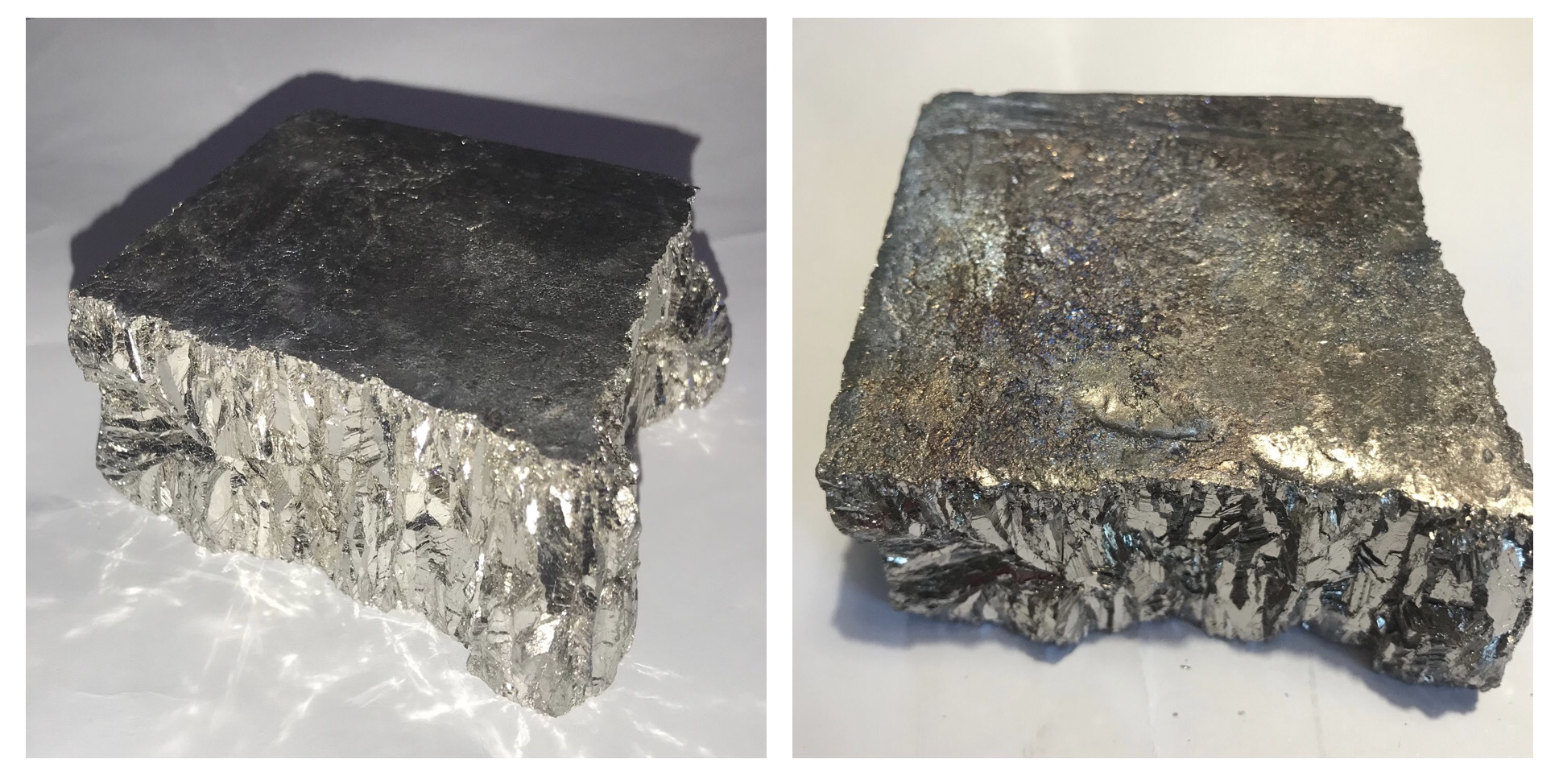
Chunk of a broken bismuth ingot

The reported abundance of bismuth in the Earth's crust varies significantly by source from 180 ppb (similar to that of silver) to 8 ppb (twice as common as gold). The most important ores of bismuth are bismuthinite and bismite. Native bismuth is known from Australia, Bolivia, and China.

World bismuth production
Country	Production (metric tonnes)	Year
World	16,000	2024
China	13,000	2024
Vietnam	1,938	2022
Laos	1,100	2024
South Korea	1,000	2024
Japan	500	2024
Peru	251	2022
Kazakhstan	180	2024
Bolivia	70	2024
Bulgaria	50	2024
Russia	45	2022
Armenia	4	2022

According to the United States Geological Survey (USGS), 10,200 tonnes of bismuth were produced worldwide by mining and 17,100 tonnes by refining in 2016. Since then, USGS does not provide mining data for bismuth, considering them unreliable. Globally, bismuth is mostly produced by refining, as a byproduct of extraction of other metals such as lead, copper, tin, molybdenum, and tungsten, though the refining-to-mining ratio depends on the country.

Bismuth travels in crude lead bullion (which can contain up to 10% bismuth) through several stages of refining, until it is removed by the Kroll-Betterton process, which separates the impurities as slag, or the electrolytic Betts process. Bismuth behaves similarly with another of its major metals, copper. The raw bismuth metal from both processes contains still considerable amounts of other metals, foremost lead. By reacting the molten mixture with chlorine gas, the metals are converted to their chlorides, while bismuth remains unchanged. Impurities can also be removed by various other methods, for example, with fluxes and treatments yielding high-purity bismuth metal (over 99% Bi).

=== Price ===
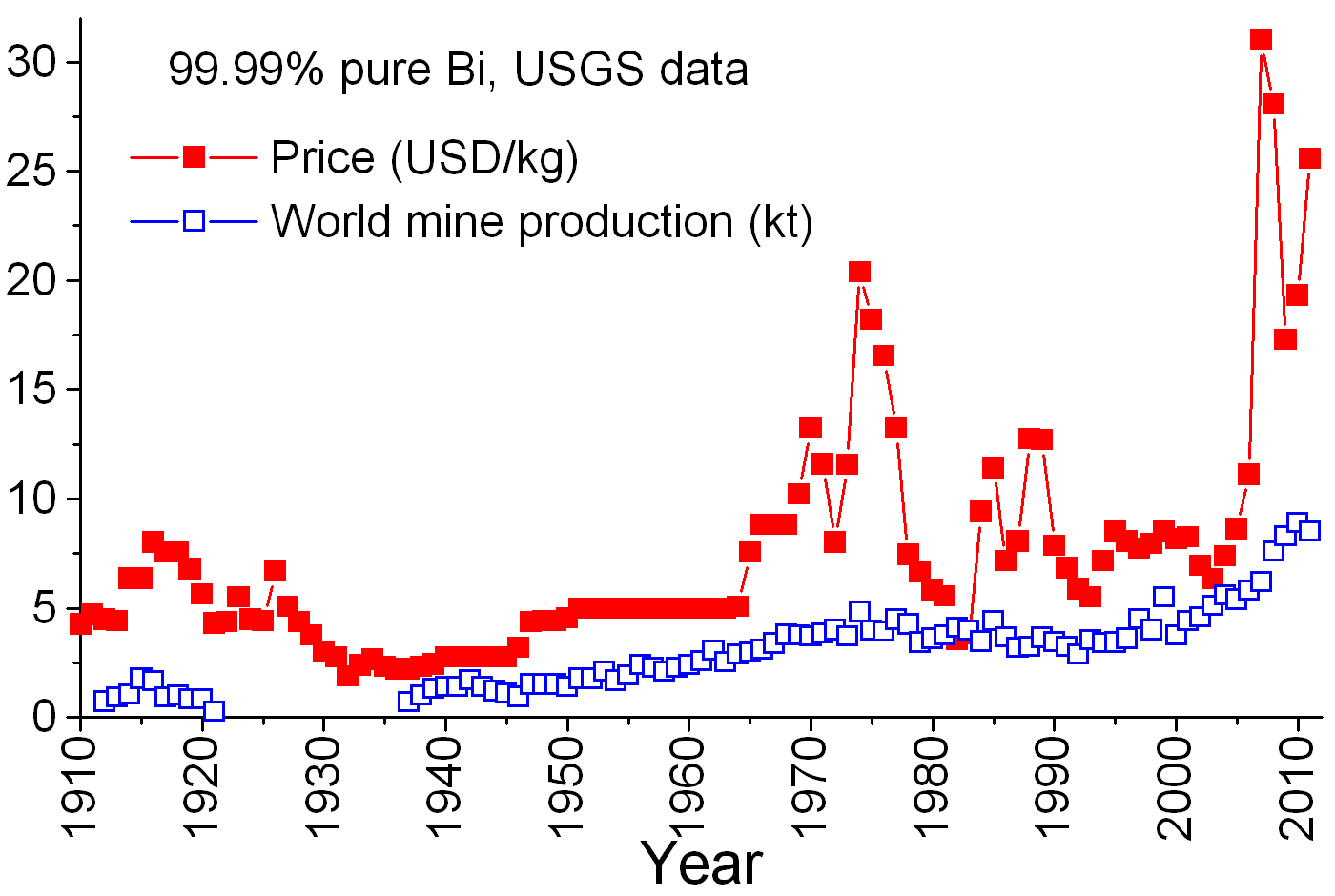
World mine production and annual averages of bismuth price (New York, not adjusted for inflation).

The price for pure bismuth metal was relatively stable through most of the 20th century, except for a spike in the 1970s. Bismuth has always been produced mainly as a byproduct of lead refining, thus the price usually reflected the cost of recovery and the balance between production and demand.

Before World War II, demand for bismuth was small and mainly pharmaceutical—bismuth compounds were used to treat such conditions as digestive disorders, sexually transmitted diseases, and burns. Minor amounts of bismuth metal were consumed in fusible alloys for fire sprinkler systems and fuse wire. During World War II, bismuth was considered a strategic material, used for solders, fusible alloys, medications, and atomic research. To stabilize the market, the producers set the price at $1.25 per pound ($2.75 /kg) during the war and at $2.25 per pound ($4.96 /kg) from 1950 until 1964.

In the early 1970s, the price rose rapidly due to increasing demand for bismuth as a metallurgical additive to aluminium, iron, and steel. This was followed by a decline owing to increased world production, stabilized consumption, and the recessions of 1980 and 1981–1982. In 1984, the price began to climb as consumption increased worldwide, especially in the United States and Japan. In the early 1990s, research began on the evaluation of bismuth as a nontoxic replacement for lead in ceramic glazes, fishing sinkers, food-processing equipment, free-machining brasses for plumbing applications, lubricating greases, and shot for waterfowl hunting. Growth in these areas remained slow during the middle 1990s, in spite of the backing of lead replacement by the United States federal government, but intensified around 2005. This resulted in a rapid and continuing increase in price.

=== Recycling ===
Most bismuth is produced as a byproduct of other metal-extraction processes, including the smelting of lead, tungsten, and copper. Its sustainability is dependent on increased recycling, which is problematic.

Bismuth was once believed to be practically recycled from the soldered joints in electronic equipment. Recent efficiencies in solder application in electronics mean substantially less solder is deposited, thus less is available to recycle. While recovering the silver from silver-bearing solder may remain economic, recovering bismuth is substantially less so.

Dispersed bismuth is used in certain stomach medicines (bismuth subsalicylate), paints (bismuth vanadate), pearlescent cosmetics (bismuth oxychloride), and bismuth-containing bullets. Recycling bismuth from these uses is impractical.

== Applications ==
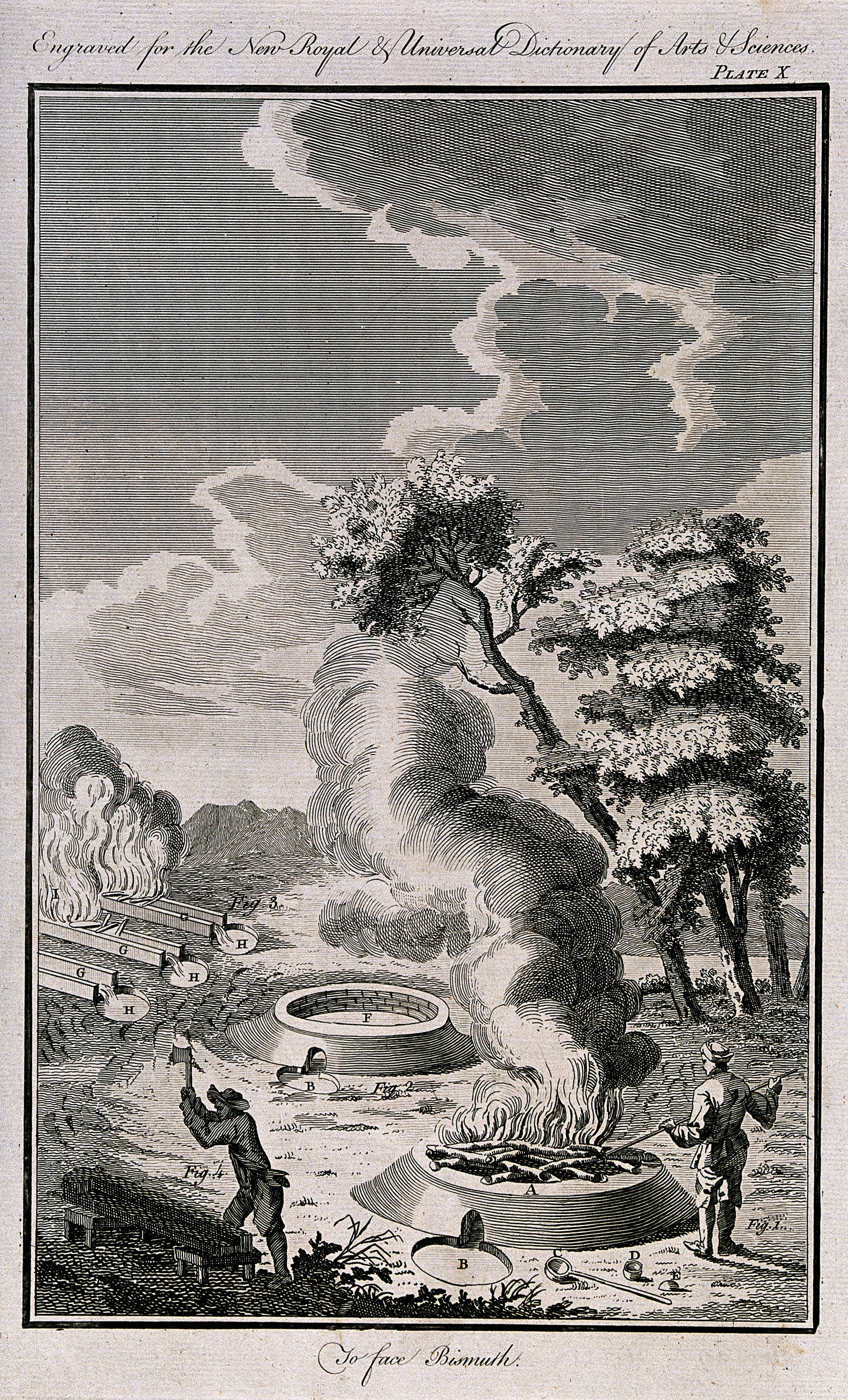
An 18th-century engraving of bismuth processing: During this era, bismuth was used to treat some digestive complaints.

Bismuth has few commercial applications, and those that use it generally require small quantities relative to other raw materials. In the United States, for example, 733 tonnes of bismuth were consumed in 2016, of which 70% went into chemicals (including pharmaceuticals, pigments, and cosmetics) and 11% into bismuth alloys.

=== Medicines ===
Bismuth is an ingredient in some pharmaceuticals, although the use of some of these substances is declining.

- Bismuth subsalicylate is used to treat diarrhea; it is the active ingredient in such "pink bismuth" preparations as Pepto-Bismol, as well as the 2004 reformulation of Kaopectate. It is also used to treat some other gastrointestinal diseases such as shigellosis and cadmium poisoning. The mechanism of action of this substance is still not well documented, although an oligodynamic effect (toxic effect of small doses of heavy metal ions on microbes) may be involved in at least some cases. Salicylic acid from hydrolysis of the compound is antimicrobial for toxogenic E. coli, an important pathogen in traveler's diarrhea.
- A combination of bismuth subsalicylate and bismuth subcitrate is used to treat the bacteria causing peptic ulcers.
- Bibrocathol is an organic bismuth-containing compound used to treat eye infections.
- Bismuth subgallate, the active ingredient in Devrom, is used as an internal deodorant to treat malodor from flatulence and feces.
- Bismuth salts began being used for treatment of congenital syphilis in 1884, expanding to syphilis treatment in the general population between 1921 and 1924. Bismuth salts (including sodium bismuth tartrate) administered via intramuscular injection offered a less toxic alternative or supplement to arsenic-based therapies such as Salvarsan. Bismuth compounds served as a standard treatment for syphilis until 1943, when the introduction of penicillin superseded heavy metal-based protocols. Despite this shift, bismuth therapies persisted in several regions, such as France, where they remained in use for specific stages of the disease until at least the late 1970s.
- "Milk of bismuth" (an aqueous suspension of bismuth hydroxide and bismuth subcarbonate) was marketed as an alimentary cure-all in the early 20th century, and has been used to treat gastrointestinal disorders.
- Bismuth subnitrate (Bi_{5}O(OH)_{9}(NO_{3})_{4}) and bismuth subcarbonate (Bi_{2}O_{2}(CO_{3})) are also used in medicine.

=== Cosmetics and pigments ===
Bismuth oxychloride (BiOCl) is sometimes used in cosmetics, as a pigment in paint for eye shadows, hair sprays, and nail polishes. This compound is found as the mineral bismoclite and in crystal form contains layers of atoms (see figure above) that refract light chromatically, resulting in an iridescent appearance similar to nacre of pearl. It was used as a cosmetic in ancient Egypt and in many places since. Bismuth white (also "Spanish white") can refer to either bismuth oxychloride or bismuth oxynitrate (BiONO_{3}), when used as a white pigment. Bismuth vanadate is used as a light-stable nonreactive paint pigment (particularly for artists' paints), often as a replacement for the more toxic cadmium sulfide yellow and orange-yellow pigments. The most common variety in artists' paints is a lemon yellow, visually indistinguishable from its cadmium-containing alternative.

=== Electronics ===
==== Transistors ====
Bismuth-based materials have been claimed to enable smaller, faster, and more energy-efficient transistors than traditional silicon. Bismuth offers a small bandgap and high electron mobility. It has topological insulator states, conducting along its surface/edges while still insulating internally. Two-dimensional semiconductor (2D) materials can be produced from it, enabling thinner and higher-performance devices. Such 2D bismuth materials support subnanometer channel lengths, surpassing silicon's practical limits. However, bismuth's anisotropic heat transport can complicate chip design.

Bismuth telluride (Bi_{2}Te_{3}) has been investigated for use in thermoelectric transistors that use temperature gradients (e.g., via laser illumination) to generate electricity, yielding 0.7093 μW in experimental setups. They operate by leveraging the Seebeck effect, using a temperature difference to drive charge carrier movement.

Bismuth oxyselenides (Bi_{2}O_{2}Se and Bi_{2}SeO_{5}) have been investigated for use in field-effect transistors (FETs). These 2D materials exhibit high electron mobility (e.g., 10–15 cm2/(V·s)) and stability in air. One study reported that these materials enabled transistors that were 40% faster and 10% more efficient than Intel's 3 nm chips.

Bismuth can reduce contact resistance when paired with 2D semiconductors such as MoS_{2}. This eliminates the Schottky barrier—a common efficiency issue in metal-semiconductor interfaces.

==== Solders ====
Bismuth is utilised in silver-free electronic solders to provide solid solution strengthening. Because bismuth atoms are larger than tin atoms, their insertion into the tin crystal lattice distorts the structure and restricts the movement of crystal defects (dislocations). This atomic lattice distortion provides resistance to mechanical deformation during thermal cycling. Keeping the bismuth content below the solid solubility limit prevents microstructural instability and electromigration across the typical operating temperature range of electronic circuitry. Unlike particle-strengthened alloys (such as SAC305), this solid solution mechanism resists deformation without generating the dislocation pile-ups that drive microstructural recrystallisation, reducing a primary cause of joint failure and loss of electrical continuity.

=== Metal and alloys ===
Bismuth is used in alloys with other metals such as tin and lead. Wood's metal, an alloy of bismuth, lead, tin, and cadmium, is used in automatic sprinkler systems for fires. It forms the largest part (50%) of Rose's metal, a fusible alloy, which also contains 25–28% lead and 22–25% tin. It was also used to make bismuth bronze, which was used during the Bronze Age, having been found in Inca knives at Machu Picchu.

==== Lead replacement ====
The density difference between lead (11.32 g/cm^{3}) and bismuth (9.78 g/cm^{3}) is small enough that for many ballistics and weighting applications, bismuth can substitute for lead. For example, it can replace lead as a dense material in fishing sinkers. It has been used as a replacement for lead in shot, bullets, and less lethal riot gun ammunition. The Netherlands, Denmark, England, Wales, the United States, and many other countries now prohibit the use of lead shot for the hunting of wetland birds, as many birds are prone to lead poisoning owing to mistaken ingestion of lead (instead of small stones and grit) to aid digestion, or even prohibit the use of lead for all hunting, such as in the Netherlands. Bismuth-tin alloy shot is one alternative that provides similar ballistic performance to lead.

Bismuth, as a dense element of high atomic weight, is used in bismuth-impregnated latex shields to shield from X-rays in medical examinations, such as CTs, mostly as it is considered nontoxic.

The European Union's Restriction of Hazardous Substances Directive for reduction of lead has broadened bismuth's use in electronics as a component of low-melting-point solders, as a replacement for traditional tin-lead solders. Its low toxicity is especially important for solders to be used in food-processing equipment and copper water pipes, although it can also be used in other applications, including those in the automobile industry, in the European Union, for example.

Bismuth has been evaluated as a replacement for lead in free-machining brasses for plumbing applications, although it does not equal the performance of leaded steels.

==== Other metal uses and specialty alloys ====
Many bismuth alloys have low melting points and are found in specialty applications such as solders. Many automatic sprinklers, electric fuses, and safety devices in fire detection and suppression systems contain the eutectic In_{19.1}-Cd_{5.3}-Pb_{22.6}-Sn_{8.3}-Bi_{44.7} alloy that melts at 47 °C (117 °F) This is a convenient temperature since it is unlikely to be exceeded in normal living conditions. Low-melting alloys, such as Bi-Cd-Pb-Sn alloy, which melts at 70 °C (158 °F), are also used in automotive and aviation industries. Before deforming a thin-walled metal part, it is filled with a melt or covered with a thin layer of the alloy to reduce the chance of breaking. Then, the alloy is removed by submerging the part in boiling water.

Bismuth is used to make free-machining steels and free-machining aluminium alloys for precision machining properties. It has similar effect to lead and improves the chip breaking during machining. The shrinking on solidification in lead and the expansion of bismuth compensate each other, so lead and bismuth are often used in similar quantities. Similarly, alloys containing comparable parts of bismuth and lead exhibit a very small change (on the order 0.01%) upon melting, solidification, or aging. Such alloys are used in high-precision casting, e.g. in dentistry, to create models and molds. Bismuth is also used as an alloying agent in production of malleable irons and as a thermocouple material.

Bismuth is also used in aluminium-silicon cast alloys to refine silicon morphology. However, it indicated a poisoning effect on modification of strontium. Some bismuth alloys, such as Bi_{35}-Pb_{37}-Sn_{25}, are combined with nonsticking materials such as mica, glass, and enamels because they easily wet them, allowing to make joints to other parts. Addition of bismuth to caesium enhances the quantum yield of caesium cathodes. Sintering of bismuth and manganese powders at 300 °C (572 °F) produces a permanent magnet and magnetostrictive material, which is used in ultrasonic generators and receivers working in the 10–100 kHz range and in magnetic and holographic memory devices.

=== Other uses as compounds ===
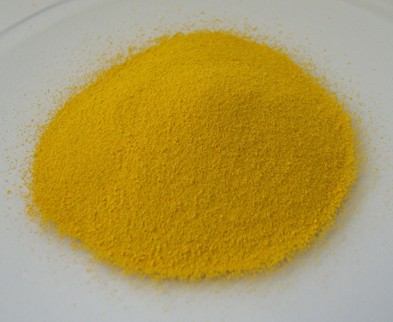
Bismuth vanadate, a yellow pigment

- Bismuth is included in bismuth strontium calcium copper oxide, which is a group of similar superconducting compounds discovered in 1988 that exhibit the highest superconducting transition temperatures.
- Bismuth telluride is a semiconductor and an excellent thermoelectric material. Bi_{2}Te_{3} diodes are used in mobile refrigerators, CPU coolers, and as detectors in infrared spectrophotometers.
- Bismuth oxide, in its delta form, is a solid electrolyte for oxygen. This form normally breaks down below a high-temperature threshold, but can be electrodeposited well below this temperature in a highly alkaline solution.
- Bismuth germanate is a scintillator, widely used in X-ray and gamma ray detectors.
- Bismuth vanadate is an opaque yellow pigment used by some artists' oil, acrylic, and watercolor paint companies, primarily as a replacement for the more toxic cadmium sulfide yellows in the greenish-yellow (lemon) to orange-toned yellow range. It performs practically identically to the cadmium pigments, such as in terms of resistance to degradation from UV exposure, opacity, tinting strength, and lack of reactivity when mixed with other pigments. The most commonly used variety by artists' paint makers is lemon in color. In addition to being a replacement for several cadmium yellows, it also serves as a nontoxic visual replacement for the older chromate pigments made with zinc, lead, and strontium. If a green pigment and barium sulfate (for increased transparency) are added, it can also serve as a replacement for barium chromate, which possesses a more greenish cast than the others. In comparison with lead chromate, it does not blacken due to hydrogen sulfide in the air (a process accelerated by UV exposure) and possesses a particularly brighter color than them, especially the lemon, which is the most translucent, dull, and fastest to blacken due to the higher percentage of lead sulfate required to produce that shade. It is also used, on a limited basis due to its cost, as a vehicle paint pigment. Bismuth vanadate can also be used as electrocatalyst for hydrogen peroxide synthesis.
- Bismuth tungstate can be used as photocatalyst for removal of phenolic compounds as well as for hydrogen generation.
- Bismuth molybdate is a catalyst for propylene oxidation as well as photocatalyst.
- A catalyst for making acrylic fibers.
- As an electrocatalyst in the conversion of CO_{2} to CO.
- Ingredient in lubricating greases.
- In crackling microstars (dragon's eggs) in pyrotechnics, as the oxide, subcarbonate or subnitrate.
- As catalyst for the fluorination of arylboronic pinacol esters through a Bi(III)/Bi(V) catalytic cycle, mimicking transition metals in electrophilic fluorination.

== Toxicology and ecotoxicology ==
Scientific literature indicates that some of the compounds of bismuth are less toxic to humans via ingestion than other heavy metals (lead, arsenic, antimony, etc.) presumably due to the comparatively low solubility of bismuth salts. Its biological half-life for whole-body retention is reported to be 5 days, but it can remain in the kidney for years in people treated with bismuth compounds.

Bismuth poisoning can occur and has, according to some reports, been common in relatively recent times. As with lead, bismuth poisoning can result in the formation of a black deposit on the gingiva, known as a bismuth line. Poisoning may be treated with dimercaprol, but evidence for benefit is unclear.

Bismuth's environmental impacts are not well known; it may be less likely to bioaccumulate than some other heavy metals, and this is an area of active research.

== See also ==
- Bismuth minerals
- Arsenic-bismuth

== Cited sources ==
.
