= Bismuth oxynitrate =

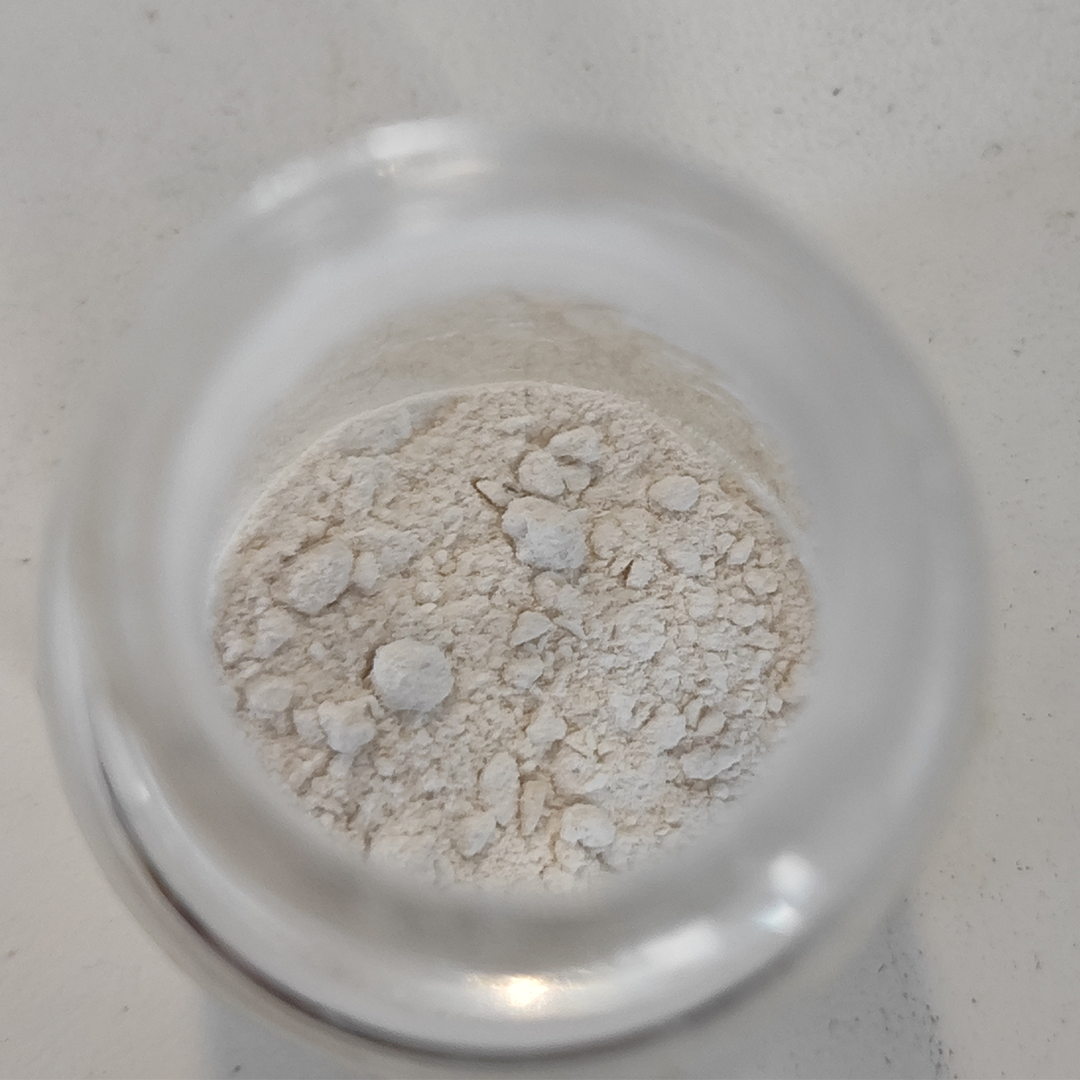

Names
- IUPAC name pentabismuth;oxygen(2-);nonahydroxide;tetranitrate
- Other names Bismuthyl nitrate Basic bismuth nitrate Bismuth subnitrate [USP:JAN] Bismutum subnitricum Magisterium bismuti

Identifiers
CAS Number	1304-85-4
3D model (JSmol)	Interactive image
ChEBI	CHEBI:31293
ChemSpider	65321938
DrugBank	DB13209
MeSH	bismuth+subnitrate
PubChem CID	73415757
UNII	H19J064BA5
- InChI: InChI=1S/5Bi.4NO3.9H2O.O/c;;;;;4*2-1(3)4;;;;;;;;;;/h;;;;;;;;;9*1H2;/q5*+3;4*-1;;;;;;;;;;-2/p-9 Key: QGWDKKHSDXWPET-UHFFFAOYSA-E
- SMILES: [N+](=O)([O-])[O-].[N+](=O)([O-])[O-].[N+](=O)([O-])[O-].[N+](=O)([O-])[O-].[OH-].[OH-].[OH-].[OH-].[OH-].[OH-].[OH-].[OH-].[OH-].[O-2].[Bi+3].[Bi+3].[Bi+3].[Bi+3].[Bi+3]

Properties
Chemical formula	Bi_{5}H_{9}N_{4}O_{22} (Basic formula)
Molar mass	1461.99 g/mol
Density	1.79 g/mL (H_{2}O)
Melting point	Decomposes at 260
Boiling point	Decomposes at 260
Solubility in water	Insoluble

Hazards
- GHS labelling
Pictograms	(GHS03: Oxidizing) (GHS07: Exclamation mark)
- Except where otherwise noted, data are given for materials in their standard state (at 25 °C [77 °F], 100 kPa). Infobox references

Bismuth subnitrate monohydrate
Names
- IUPAC name oxobismuthanyl nitrate;hydrate

Identifiers
CAS Number	13595-83-0
3D model (JSmol)	Interactive image
PubChem CID	129842132
- InChI: InChI=1S/Bi.NO3.H2O.O/c;2-1(3)4;;/h;;1H2;/q+1;-1;; Key: HFJNHTDBULDRRH-UHFFFAOYSA-N
- SMILES: [N+](=O)([O-])O[Bi]=O.O

Properties
Chemical formula	BiH_{2}NO_{5} (Basic formula)
Molar mass	305 g/mol
- Except where otherwise noted, data are given for materials in their standard state (at 25 °C [77 °F], 100 kPa). Infobox references

Bismuth oxynitrate is the name applied to a number of compounds that contain Bi^{3+}, nitrate ions and oxide ions and which can be considered as compounds formed from Bi_{2}O_{3}, N_{2}O_{5} and H_{2}O. Other names for bismuth oxynitrate include bismuth subnitrate and bismuthyl nitrate. In older texts bismuth oxynitrate is often simply described as BiONO_{3} or basic bismuth nitrate. Bismuth oxynitrate was once called magisterium bismuti or bismutum subnitricum, and was used as a white pigment, in beauty care, and as a gentle disinfectant for internal and external use. It is also used to form Dragendorff's reagent, which is used as a TLC stain.

== Hydrates ==
Bismuth oxynitrate is commercially available as Bi_{5}O(OH)_{9}(NO_{3})_{4} (CAS number: 1304-85-4 ) or as BiONO_{3}·H_{2}O (CAS Number: 13595-83-0 ).

Some compounds have been fully characterised with single crystal studies and found to contain the octahedral [Bi_{6}O_{x}(OH)_{8−x}]^{(10−x)+} cation. There is indirect evidence that either the octahedral cation Bi_{6}O_{4}(OH)^{6+}_{4} or the octahedral cation Bi_{6}(OH)^{6+}_{12} is present in aqueous solution following the polymerisation of Bi(H_{2}O)^{3+}_{8}, the Bi^{3+} ion present in acidic solutions. The ion Bi_{6}O_{4}(OH)^{6+}_{4} is found in the perchlorate compound Bi_{6}O_{4}(OH)_{4}ClO_{4}·7H_{2}O and is isoelectronic with the octahedral Sn_{6}O_{4}(OH)_{4} cluster found in the hydrate of tin(II) oxide, 3SnO·H_{2}O. The compounds that contain this are:

Bi_{6}O_{4}(HO)_{4}(NO_{3})_{6}·H_{2}O (equivalent to BiONO_{3}·1/2H_{2}O; Bi_{2}O_{3}·N_{2}O_{5}·H_{2}O )

Bi_{6}O_{4}(OH)_{4}(NO_{3})_{6}·4H_{2}O (equivalent to BiONO_{3}·H_{2}O; Bi_{2}O_{3}·N_{2}O_{5}·6H_{2}O )

[Bi_{6}O_{4}(OH)_{4}][Bi_{6}O_{5}(OH)_{3}](NO_{3})_{11}, which contains two different cations, [Bi_{6}O_{4}(OH)_{4}]^{6+} and [Bi_{6}O_{5}(OH)_{3}]^{5+}

The compound Bi_{6}O_{5}(OH)_{3}(NO_{3})_{5}·3H_{2}O (equivalent to 6Bi_{2}O_{3}·5N_{2}O_{5}·9H_{2}O) also contains the octahedral units but this time they are joined to form {[Bi_{6}O_{5}(OH)_{3}]^{5+}}_{2}.

Additionally some oxynitrates have layer structures (a common motif also found in bismuth(III) oxyhalides):

Bi_{2}O_{2}(OH)NO_{3} (equivalent to BiONO_{3}·1/2H_{2}O) contains "[Bi_{2}O_{2}]^{2+}" layers
Bi_{5}O_{7}NO_{3}, which is isostructural with β-Bi_{5}O_{7}I

== Cluster cation structure ==
The octahedral ion has 6 Bi^{3+} ions at the corners of an octahedron. There is no covalent bond between the Bi atoms, they are held in position by bridging O^{2−} and OH^{−} anions, one at the centre of each of the eight triangular faces, bridging three Bi ions. The Bi ions are essentially four coordinate and are at the apex of a flat square pyramid. An ab initio theoretical study of the hydration mechanism of Bi^{3+} and the structure concludes that the lone pairs on the Bi^{3+} ions are stereochemically active.
