= C2H8N2 =

The molecular formula C_{2}H_{8}N_{2} (molar mass: 60.10 g/mol, exact mass: 60.0688 u) may refer to:

- Dimethylhydrazine
  - Unsymmetrical dimethylhydrazine
  - Symmetrical dimethylhydrazine
- Ethylenediamine, or ethane-1,2-diamine
