= Methylhydrazines =

Methylhydrazines are hydrazines that have additional methyl groups. Heavily methylated versions exist as hydrazinium salts.

Members of this class include:

- Monomethylhydrazine
  - Monomethylhydrazinium (cationic and exists as a variety of salts)
- Dimethylhydrazines
  - Symmetrical dimethylhydrazine (1,2-dimethylhydrazine)
  - Unsymmetrical dimethylhydrazine (1,1-dimethylhydrazine)
- Trimethylhydrazine
  - 1,1,2-trimethylhydrazine
  - 1,1,1-trimethylhydrazinium (cationic and exists as a variety of salts e.g. 1,1,1-trimethylhydrazinium iodide)
- Tetramethylhydrazine
  - 1,1,2,2-tetramethylhydrazine
  - 1,1,1,2-tetramethylhydrazinium (cationic and exists as a variety of salts)
- Pentamethylhydrazinium (cationic and exists as a variety of salts)
- Hexamethylhydrazinediium (dication, exists as a variety of salts)
