= Phosphorus =

Chemical element

Phosphorus, _{15}P
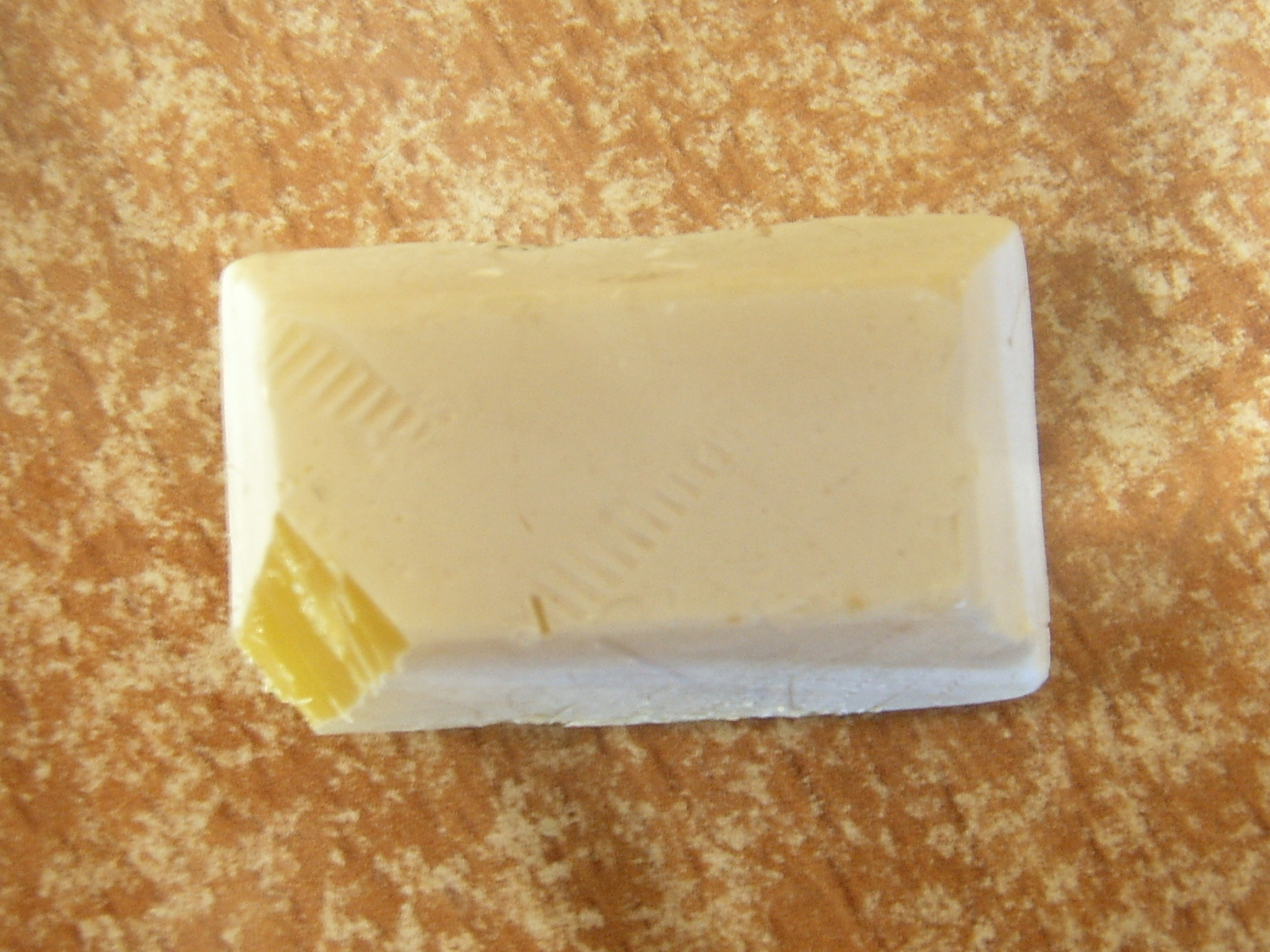
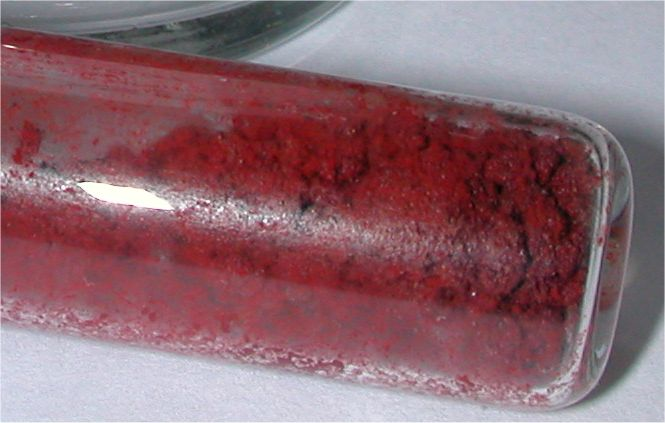
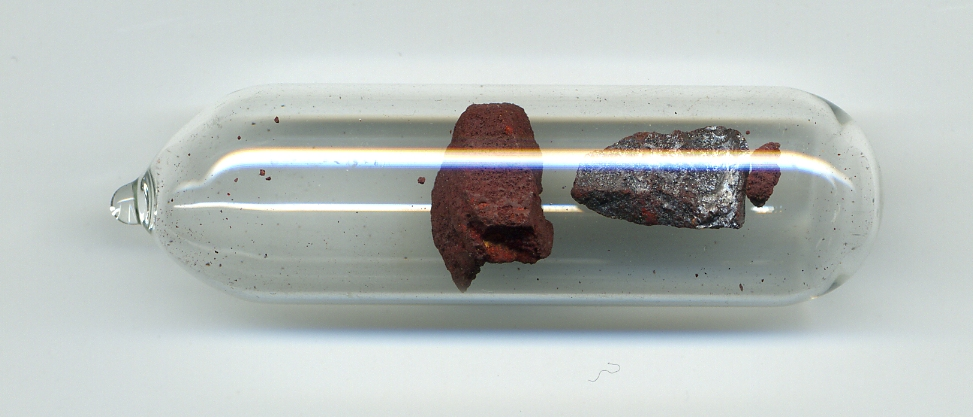
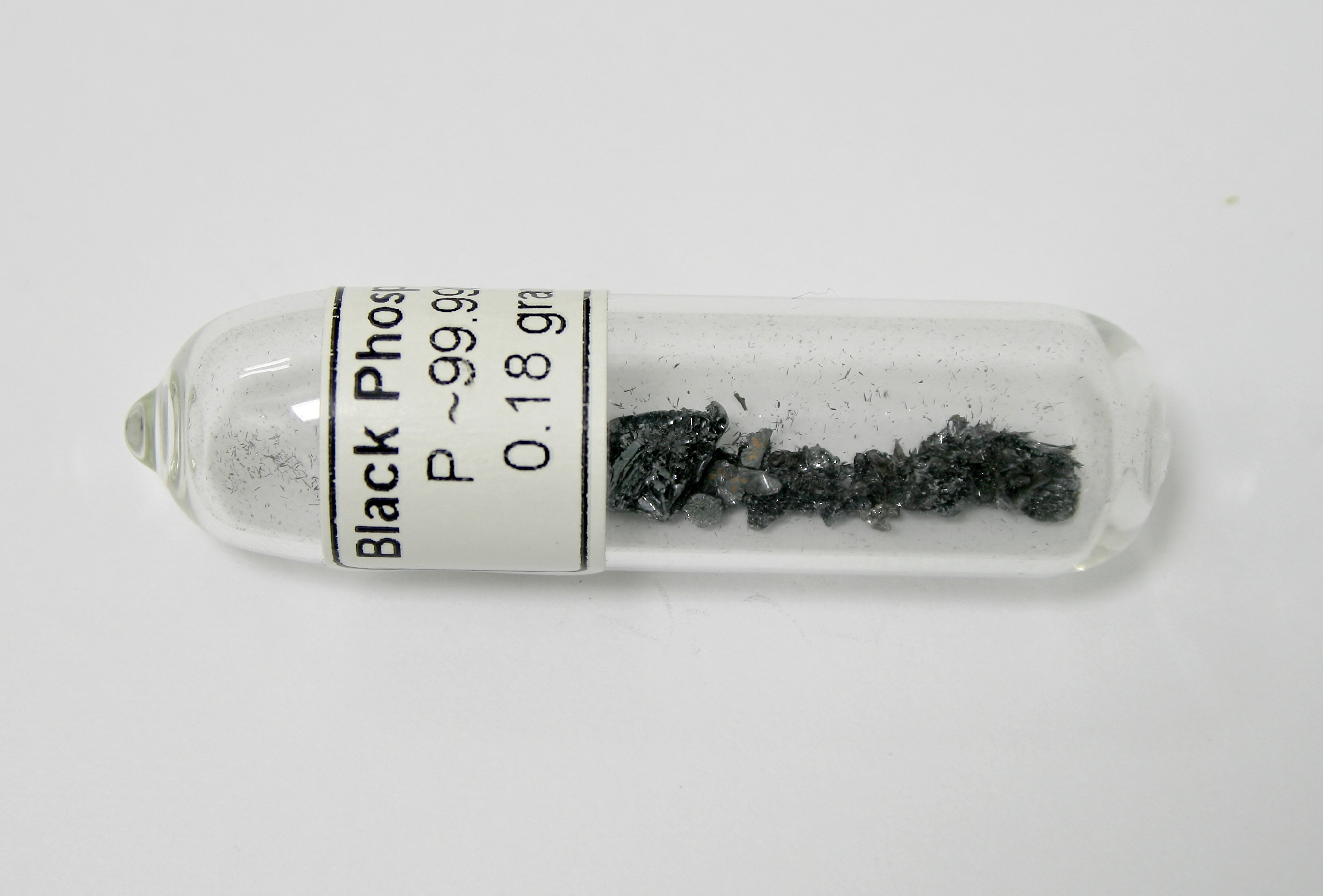
- Forms of phosphorus Waxy white Red Red and violet Black

Phosphorus
- Pronunciation: /ˈfɒsfərəs/ (FOS-fər-əs)
- Allotropes: white, red, violet, black and others (see Allotropes of phosphorus)
- Appearance: white, red and violet are waxy, black is metallic-looking

Standard atomic weight A_{r}°(P)
- 30.973761998±0.000000005; 30.974±0.001 (abridged)

Abundance
- in the Earth's crust: 5.2 (silicon = 100)

Phosphorus in the periodic table
Hydrogen																															Helium
Lithium	Beryllium																									Boron	Carbon	Nitrogen	Oxygen	Fluorine	Neon
Sodium	Magnesium																									Aluminium	Silicon	Phosphorus	Sulfur	Chlorine	Argon
Potassium	Calcium															Scandium	Titanium	Vanadium	Chromium	Manganese	Iron	Cobalt	Nickel	Copper	Zinc	Gallium	Germanium	Arsenic	Selenium	Bromine	Krypton
Rubidium	Strontium															Yttrium	Zirconium	Niobium	Molybdenum	Technetium	Ruthenium	Rhodium	Palladium	Silver	Cadmium	Indium	Tin	Antimony	Tellurium	Iodine	Xenon
Caesium	Barium	Lanthanum	Cerium	Praseodymium	Neodymium	Promethium	Samarium	Europium	Gadolinium	Terbium	Dysprosium	Holmium	Erbium	Thulium	Ytterbium	Lutetium	Hafnium	Tantalum	Tungsten	Rhenium	Osmium	Iridium	Platinum	Gold	Mercury (element)	Thallium	Lead	Bismuth	Polonium	Astatine	Radon
Francium	Radium	Actinium	Thorium	Protactinium	Uranium	Neptunium	Plutonium	Americium	Curium	Berkelium	Californium	Einsteinium	Fermium	Mendelevium	Nobelium	Lawrencium	Rutherfordium	Dubnium	Seaborgium	Bohrium	Hassium	Meitnerium	Darmstadtium	Roentgenium	Copernicium	Nihonium	Flerovium	Moscovium	Livermorium	Tennessine	Oganesson
N
↑
P
↓
As
silicon ← phosphorus → sulfur
- Atomic number (Z): 15
- Group: group 15 (pnictogens)
- Period: period 3
- Block: p-block
- Electron configuration: [Ne] 3s^{2} 3p^{3}
- Electrons per shell: 2, 8, 5

Physical properties
- Phase at STP: solid
- Melting point: white: 317.3 K (44.15 °C, 111.5 °F) red: ∼860 K (∼590 °C, ∼1090 °F)
- Boiling point: white: 553.7 K (280.5 °C, 536.9 °F)
- Sublimation point: red: ≈689.2–863 K (≈416–590 °C, ≈780.8–1094 °F) violet: 893 K (620 °C, 1148 °F)
- Density (near r.t.): white: 1.823 g/cm^{3} red: ≈2.2–2.34 g/cm^{3} violet: 2.36 g/cm^{3} black: 2.69 g/cm^{3}
- Heat of fusion: white: 0.66 kJ/mol
- Heat of vaporisation: white: 51.9 kJ/mol
- Molar heat capacity: 23.824 J/(mol·K) (white)
- Specific heat capacity: 769.161 J/(kg·K) (white)
Vapour pressure (white)
P (Pa)	1	10	100	1 k	10 k	100 k
at T (K)	279	307	342	388	453	549
Vapour pressure (red)
P (Pa)	1	10	100	1 k	10 k	100 k
at T (K)	455	489	529	576	635	704

Atomic properties
- Oxidation states: common: −3, +3, +5 −2, −1, 0, +1, +2, +4
- Electronegativity: Pauling scale: 2.19
- Ionisation energies: 1st: 1011.8 kJ/mol; 2nd: 1907 kJ/mol; 3rd: 2914.1 kJ/mol; (more)
- Covalent radius: 107±3 pm
- Van der Waals radius: 180 pm
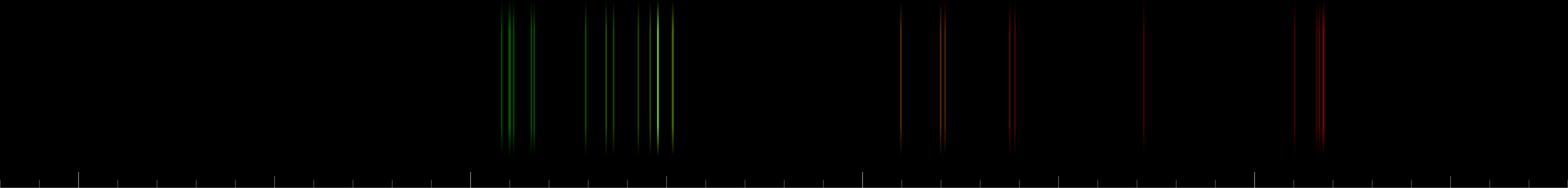
- Spectral lines of phosphorus

Other properties
- Natural occurrence: primordial
- Crystal structure: α-white: body-centred cubic (bcc) (cI232)
- Lattice constant: a = 1.869 nm (at 20 °C)
- Crystal structure: black: orthorhombic (oS8)
- Lattice constants: a = 0.33137 nm b = 1.0477 nm c = 0.43755 nm (at 20 °C)
- Thermal conductivity: white: 0.236 W/(m⋅K) black: 12.1 W/(m⋅K)
- Magnetic ordering: white, red, violet, black: diamagnetic
- Molar magnetic susceptibility: −20.8×10^{−6} cm^{3}/mol (293 K)
- Bulk modulus: white: 5 GPa red: 11 GPa
- CAS Number: 7723-14-0 (red); 12185-10-3 (white)

History
- Naming: from the greek Φωσφόρος, meaning 'light-bearer'
- Discovery: Hennig Brand (1669)
- Recognised as an element by: Antoine Lavoisier (1777)

Isotopes of phosphorus
Main isotopes			Decay	
Isotope	abundance	half-life (t_{1/2})	mode	product
^{31}P	100%	stable		
^{32}P	(unstable)	14.269 d	β^{−}	^{32}S
^{33}P	(unstable)	25.35 d	β^{−}	^{33}S

Phosphorus is a chemical element; it has symbol P and atomic number 15. All elemental forms of phosphorus are highly reactive and are therefore never found in nature. Elemental phosphorus can be prepared artificially, the two most common allotropes being white phosphorus and red phosphorus. With ^{31}P as its only stable isotope, phosphorus has an occurrence in Earth's crust of about 0.1%, generally as phosphate rock. A member of the pnictogen family, phosphorus readily forms a wide variety of organic and inorganic compounds, with as its main oxidation states +5, +3 and −3.

The isolation of white phosphorus in 1669 by Hennig Brand marked the scientific community's first discovery of an element since antiquity.

The name phosphorus is derived from the Greek phōsphoros (Φωσφόρος) 'light-bearer', referring to Phosphorus, the god of the planet Venus, and inspired by the faint glow of white phosphorus when exposed to oxygen. This property is also at the origin of the term phosphorescence, meaning glow after illumination, although white phosphorus itself does not exhibit phosphorescence, but chemiluminescence caused by its oxidation. Its high toxicity makes exposure to white phosphorus very dangerous, while its flammability and pyrophoricity can be weaponised in the form of incendiaries. Red phosphorus is less dangerous and is used in matches and fire retardants.

Most industrial production of phosphorus is focused on the mining and transformation of phosphate rock into phosphoric acid for phosphate-based fertilisers. Phosphorus is an essential and often limiting nutrient for plants, and while natural levels are normally maintained over time by the phosphorus cycle, it is too slow for the regeneration of soil that undergoes intensive cultivation. As a consequence, these fertilisers are vital to modern agriculture. The leading producers of phosphate ore in 2024 were China, Morocco, the United States and Russia, with two-thirds of the estimated exploitable phosphate reserves worldwide in Morocco alone. Other applications of phosphorus compounds include pesticides, food additives, and detergents.

Phosphorus is essential to all known forms of life, largely through organophosphates, organic compounds containing the phosphate ion PO^{3−}_{4} as a functional group. These include DNA, RNA, ATP, and phospholipids, complex compounds fundamental to the functioning of all cells. The main component of bones and teeth, bone mineral, is a modified form of hydroxyapatite, itself a phosphorus mineral.

== History ==
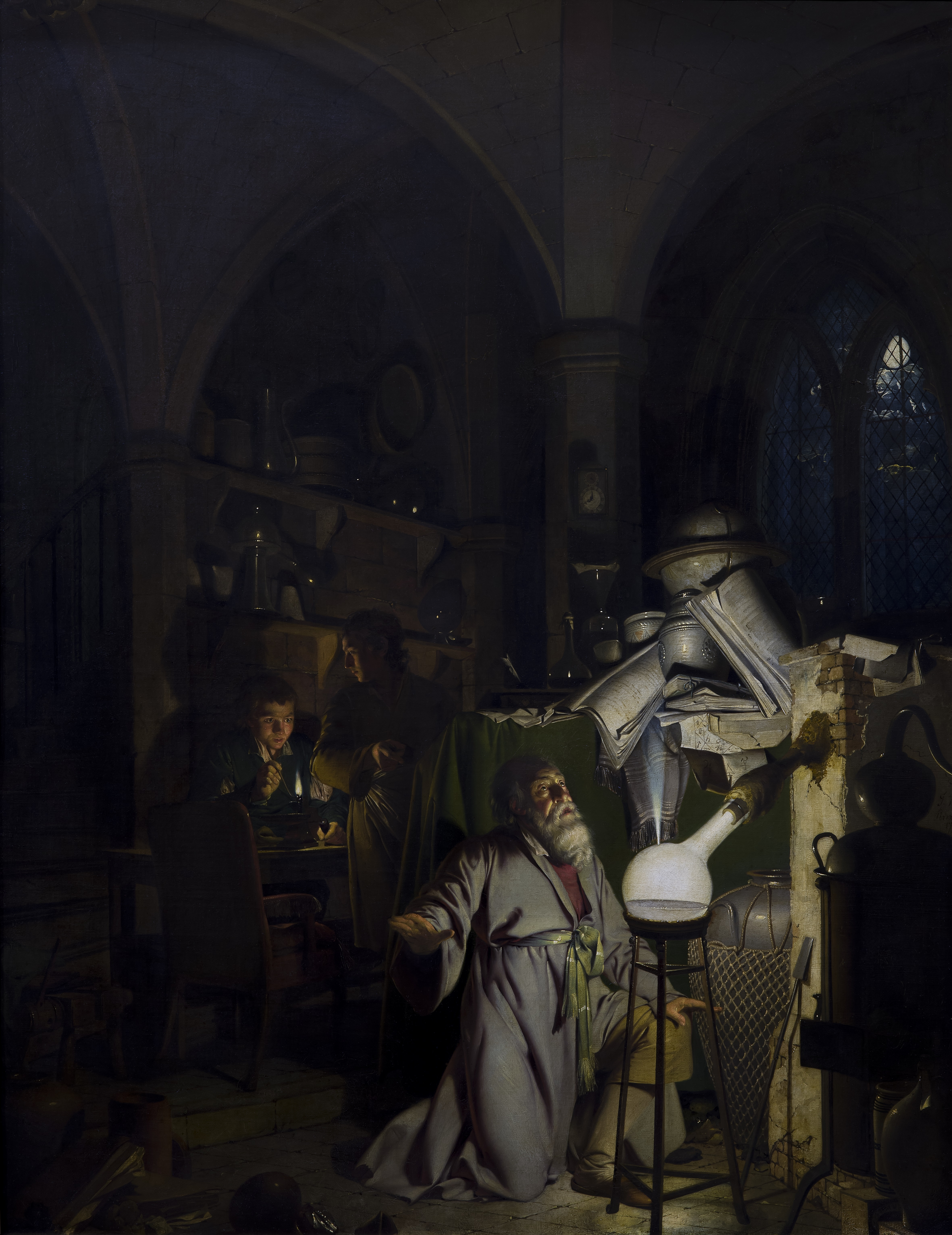
The Alchemist in Search of the Philosophers Stone (1771), by Joseph Wright, depicting Hennig Brand discovering phosphorus.

Phosphorus was the first element to be "discovered", in the sense that it was not known since ancient times. The discovery is credited to the Hamburg alchemist Hennig Brand in 1669, who was attempting to create the fabled philosopher's stone. To this end, he experimented with urine, which contains considerable quantities of dissolved phosphates from normal metabolism. By letting the urine rot (a step later discovered to be unnecessary), boiling it down to a paste, then distilling it at a high temperature and leading the resulting vapours through water, he obtained a white, waxy substance that glowed in the dark and burned brilliantly. He named it in Latin: phosphorus mirabilis, lit. 'miraculous bearer of light'. The word phosphorus (Ancient Greek: Φωσφόρος, romanized: Phōsphoros, lit. 'light-bearer') is a reference to Phosphorus, god of the morning star in Greek mythology, known also as Venus.

Brand at first tried to keep the method secret, but later sold the recipe for 200 thalers to Johann Daniel Kraft from Dresden. Kraft toured much of Europe with it, including London, where he met with Robert Boyle. The crucial fact that the substance was made from urine was eventually found out, and Johann Kunckel was able to reproduce it in Sweden in 1678. In 1680, Boyle also managed to make phosphorus and published the method of its manufacture. He was the first to use phosphorus to ignite sulfur-tipped wooden splints, forerunners of modern matches, and also improved the process by using sand in the reaction:

4 NaPO_{3} + 2 SiO_{2} + 10 C → 2 Na_{2}SiO_{3} + 10 CO + P_{4}

Boyle's assistant Ambrose Godfrey-Hanckwitz later made a business of the manufacture of phosphorus.

In 1777, Antoine Lavoisier recognised phosphorus as an element after Johan Gottlieb Gahn and Carl Wilhelm Scheele showed in 1769 that calcium phosphate is found in bones by obtaining elemental phosphorus from bone ash. Bone ash subsequently became the primary industrial source of phosphorus and remained so until the 1840s. The process consisted of several steps. First, grinding up the bones into their constituent tricalcium phosphate and treating it with sulfuric acid:

Ca_{3}(PO_{4})_{2} + 2 H_{2}SO_{4} → Ca(H_{2}PO_{4})_{2} + 2 CaSO_{4}

Then, dehydrating the resulting monocalcium phosphate:

Ca(H_{2}PO_{4})_{2} → Ca(PO_{3})_{2} + 2 H_{2}O

Finally, mixing the obtained calcium metaphosphate with ground coal or charcoal in an iron pot, and distilling phosphorus vapour out of a retort:

3 Ca(PO_{3})_{2} + 10 C → Ca_{3}(PO_{4})_{2} + 10 CO + P_{4}

This way, two-thirds of the phosphorus was turned into white phosphorus while one-third remained in the residue as calcium orthophosphate. The carbon monoxide produced during the reaction process was burnt off in a flare stack.

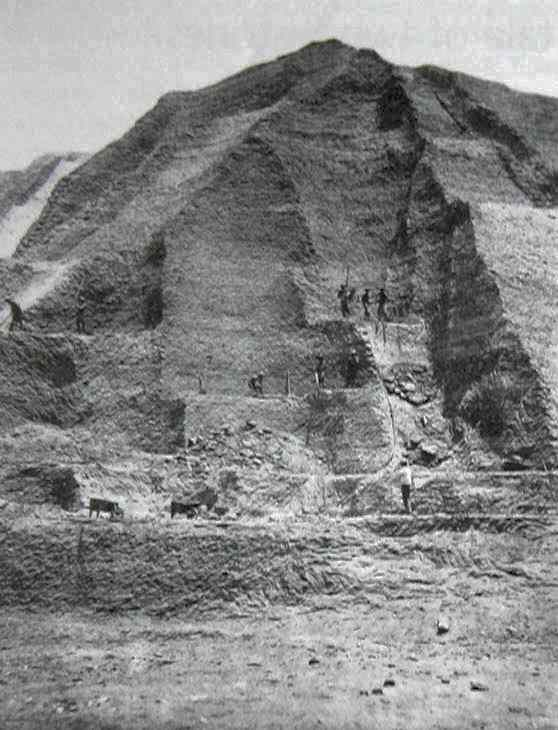
Guano mining in the Central Chincha Islands, c. 1860

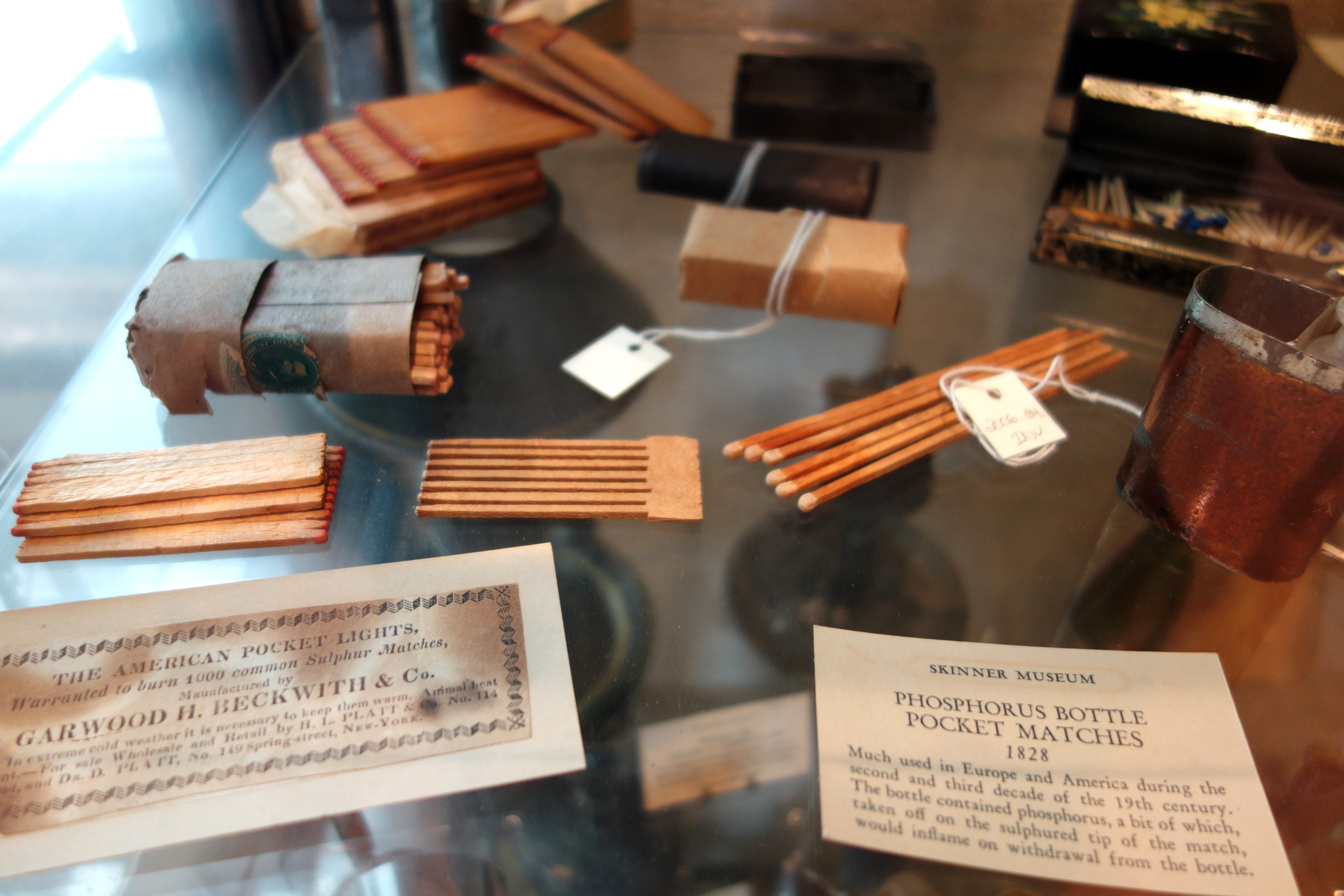
Matches from 1828. The sulfur-tipped match is dipped into liquid containing white phosphorus, and ignites as it is pulled out of the bottle.

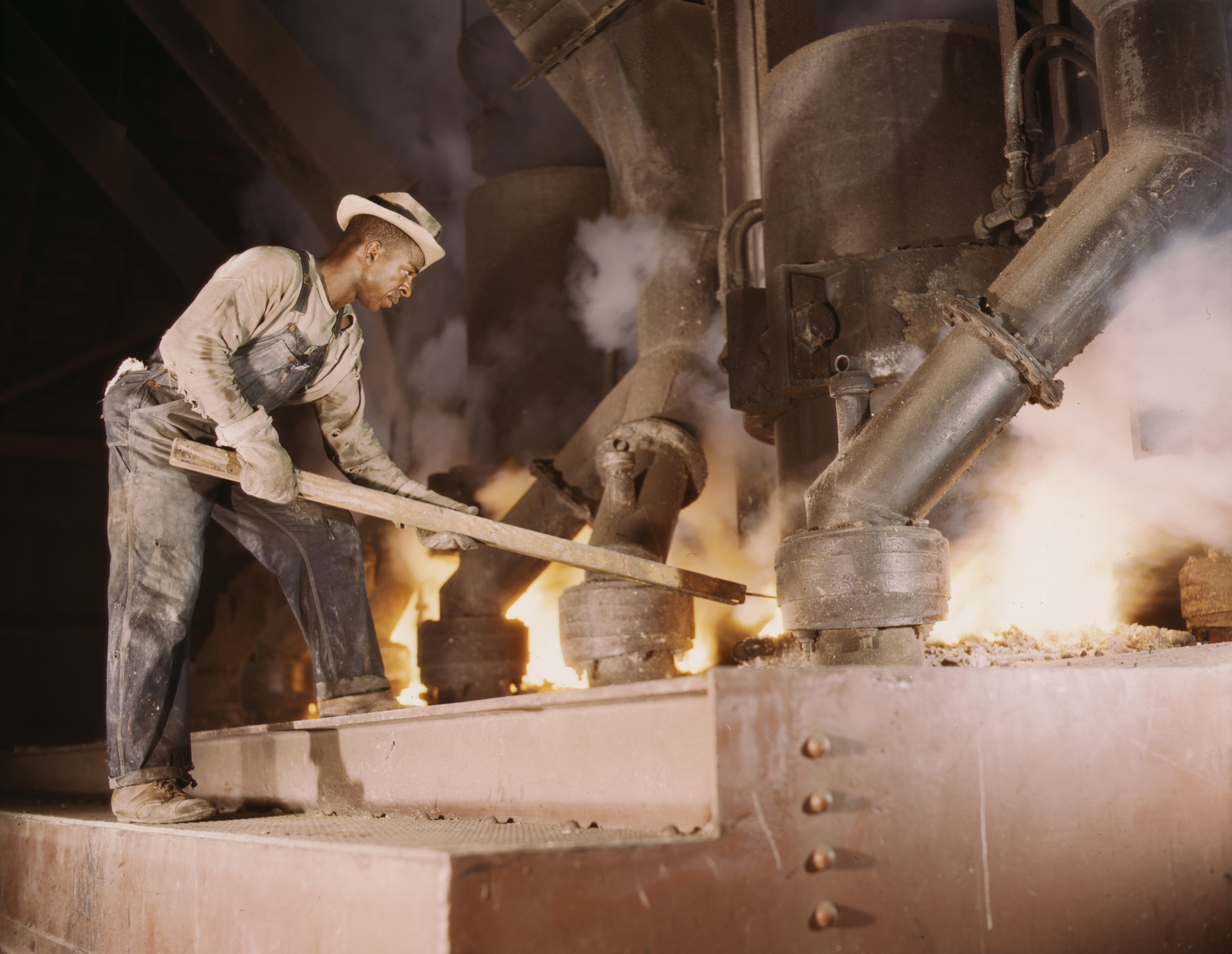
A worker tends an electric phosphate smelting furnace in Muscle Shoals, Alabama, 1942

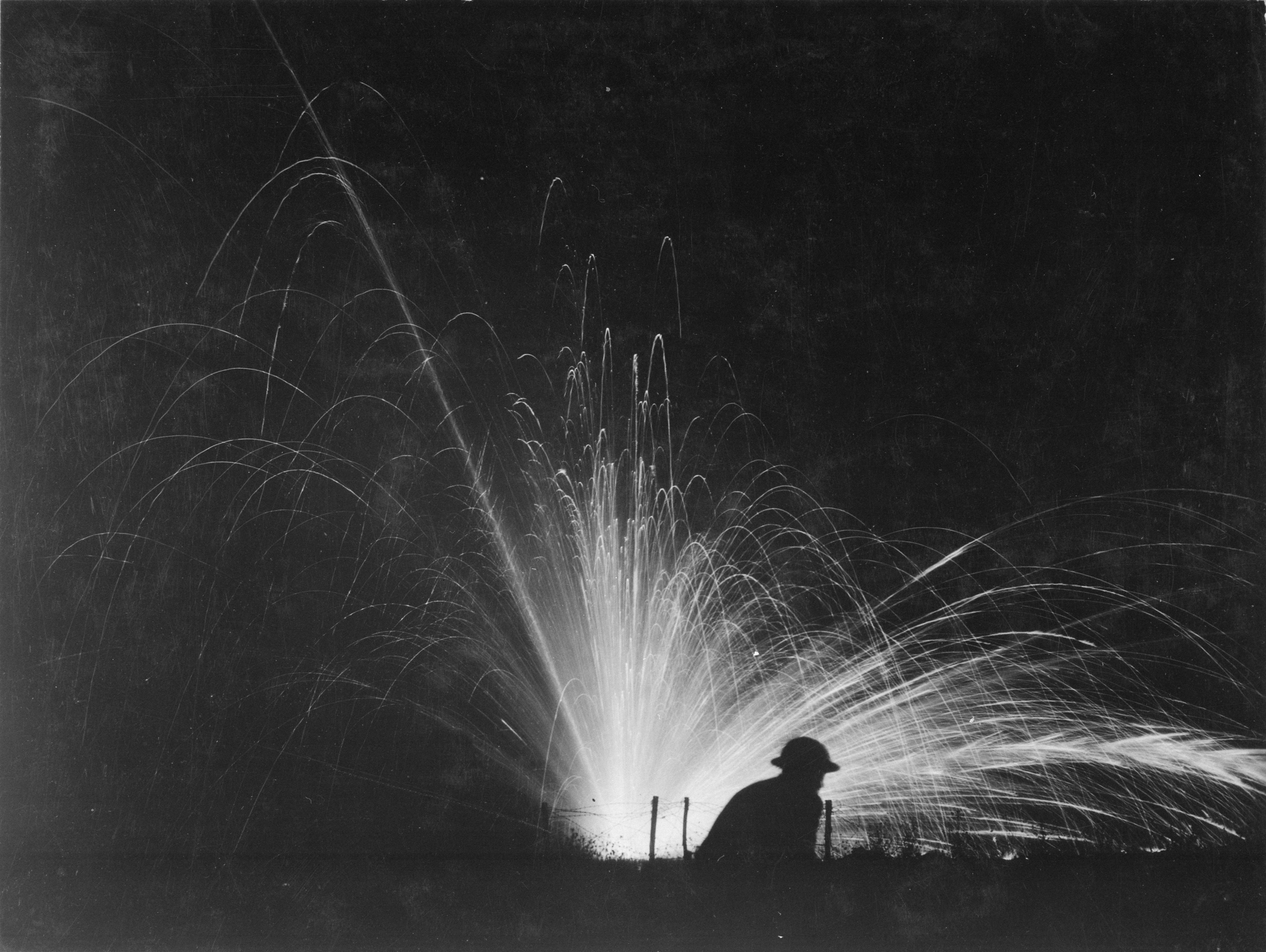
White phosphorus shell explosion in France during the First World War (1918)

In 1609 Inca Garcilaso de la Vega wrote the book Comentarios Reales in which he described many of the agricultural practices of the Incas prior to the arrival of the Spaniards and introduced the use of guano as a fertiliser. As Garcilaso described, the Incas near the coast harvested guano. In the early 1800s Alexander von Humboldt introduced guano as a source of agricultural fertiliser to Europe after having discovered it in exploitable quantities on islands off the coast of South America. It has been reported that, at the time of its discovery, the guano on some islands was over 30 meters deep. The guano had previously been used by the Moche people as a source of fertiliser by mining it and transporting it back to Peru by boat. International commerce in guano did not start until after 1840. By the start of the 20th century guano had been nearly completely depleted and was eventually overtaken with the discovery of methods of production of superphosphate.

Early matches used white phosphorus in their composition, and were very dangerous due to both its toxicity and the way the match was ignited. The first striking match with a phosphorus head was invented by Charles Sauria in 1830. These matches (and subsequent modifications) were made with heads of white phosphorus, an oxygen-releasing compound (potassium chlorate, lead dioxide, or sometimes nitrate), and a binder. They were poisonous to the workers in manufacture, exposure to the vapours causing severe necrosis of the bones of the jaw, known as "phossy jaw". Additionally, they were sensitive to storage conditions, toxic if ingested, and hazardous when accidentally ignited on a rough surface. The very high risks for match workers was at the source of several notable early cases of industrial action, such as the 1888 London Matchgirls' strike.

The discovery of red phosphorus allowed for the development of matches that were both much safer to use and to manufacture, leading to the gradual replacement of white phosphorus in matches. Additionally, around 1900 French chemists Henri Sévène and Emile David Cahen invented the modern strike-anywhere match, wherein the white phosphorus was replaced by phosphorus sesquisulfide (P_{4}S_{3}), a non-toxic and non-pyrophoric compound that ignites under friction. For a time these safer strike-anywhere matches were quite popular but in the long run they were superseded by the modern red phosphorus-based safety match. Following the implementation of these new manufacturing methods, production of white phosphorus matches was banned in several countries between 1872 and 1925, and an international treaty to this effect was signed following the Berne Convention (1906).

Phosphate rock, which usually contains calcium phosphate, was first used in 1850 to make phosphorus. With the introduction of the submerged-arc furnace for phosphorus production by James Burgess Readman in 1888 (patented 1889), the use of bone-ash became obsolete. After the depletion of world guano sources about the same time, mineral phosphates became the major source of phosphate fertiliser production. Phosphate rock production greatly increased after World War II, and remains the primary global source of phosphorus and phosphorus chemicals today.

The electric furnace method allowed production to increase to the point where it became possible that white phosphorus could be weaponised in war. In World War I, it was used in incendiary ammunition, smoke screens and tracer ammunition. A special incendiary bullet was developed to shoot at hydrogen-filled Zeppelins over Britain (hydrogen being highly flammable).

During World War II, Molotov cocktails made of phosphorus dissolved in petrol were distributed in Britain to specially selected civilians as part of the preparations for a potential invasion. The United States also developed the M15 white-phosphorus hand grenade, a precursor to the M34 grenade, while the British introduced the similar No 77 grenade. These multipurpose grenades were mostly used for signaling and smoke screens, although they were also efficient anti-personnel weapons. The difficulty of extinguishing burning phosphorus and the very severe burns it causes had a strong psychological impact on the enemy. Phosphorus incendiary bombs were used on a large scale, notably to destroy Hamburg, the place where the "miraculous bearer of light" was first discovered.

== Characteristics ==
=== Isotopes ===
There are 22 known isotopes of phosphorus, ranging from ^{26}P to ^{47}P. Only ^{31}P is stable and, therefore, has 100% abundance. The nuclear spin of 1/2 and high abundance of ^{31}P make phosphorus-31 nuclear magnetic resonance spectroscopy a very useful analytical tool in studies of phosphorus-containing samples.

Two radioactive isotopes of phosphorus have half-lives suitable for biological scientific experiments, and are used as radioactive tracers in biochemical laboratories. These are:

- ^{32}P, a beta-emitter (1.71 MeV) with a half-life of 14.3 days, which is used routinely in life-science laboratories, primarily to produce radiolabeled DNA and RNA probes, e.g. for use in Northern blots or Southern blots.
- ^{33}P, a beta-emitter (0.25 MeV) with a half-life of 25.4 days. It is used in life-science laboratories in applications in which lower energy beta emissions are advantageous such as DNA sequencing.

The high-energy beta particles from ^{32}P penetrate skin and corneas and any ^{32}P ingested, inhaled, or absorbed is readily incorporated into bone and nucleic acids. For these reasons, anyone working with ^{32}P must wear lab coats, disposable gloves, and safety glasses, and avoid working directly over open containers. Monitoring personal, clothing, and surface contamination is also required. The high energy of the beta particles gives rise to secondary emission of X-rays via Bremsstrahlung (braking radiation) in dense shielding materials such as lead. Therefore, the radiation must be shielded with low density materials such as water, acrylic or other plastic.

=== Atomic properties ===
A phosphorus atom has 15 electrons, 5 of which are valence electrons. This results in the electron configuration 1s^{2}2s^{2}2p^{6}3s^{2}3p^{3}, often simplified as [Ne]3s^{2}3p^{3}, omitting the core electrons which have a configuration equivalent to the noble gas of the preceding period, in this case neon. The molar ionisation energies of these five electrons are 1011.8, 1907, 2914.1, 4963.6 and 6273.9 kJ⋅mol^{−1}.

Phosphorus is a member of the pnictogens (also called group 15) and period 3 elements, and many of its chemical properties can be inferred from its position on the periodic table as a result of periodic trends. Like nitrogen, arsenic and antimony, its main oxidation states are −3, +3 and +5, with every one in-between less common but known. Phosphorus shows as expected more electronegativity than silicon and arsenic, less than sulfur and nitrogen, but also notably less than carbon, affecting the nature and properties of P–C bonds. It is the element with the lowest atomic number to exhibit hypervalence, meaning that it can form more bonds per atom that would normally be permitted by the octet rule.

=== Allotropes ===
Crystalline structures of the main phosphorus allotropes

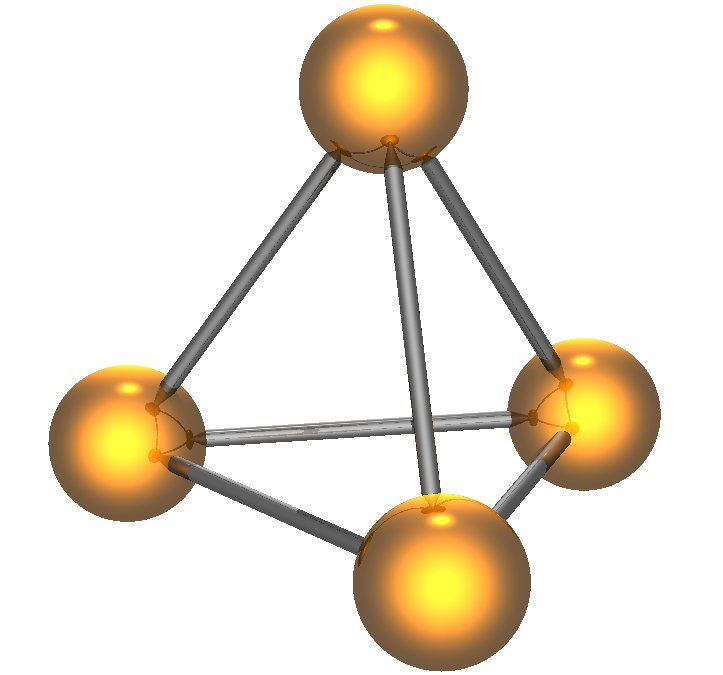
White

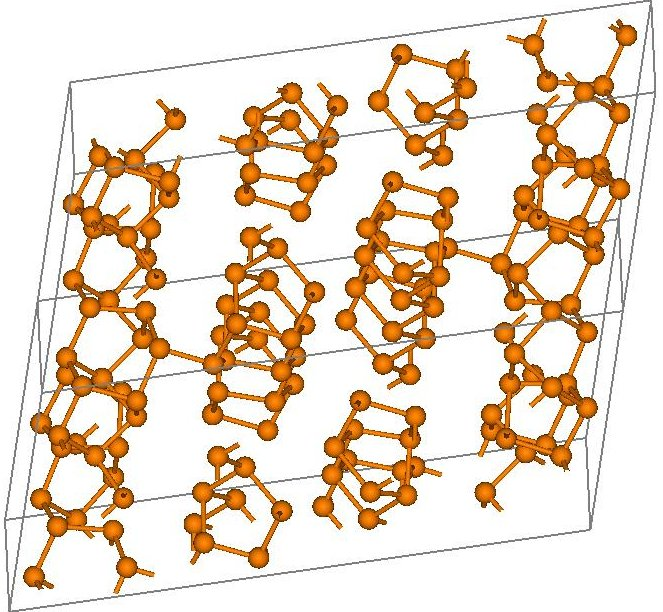
Red

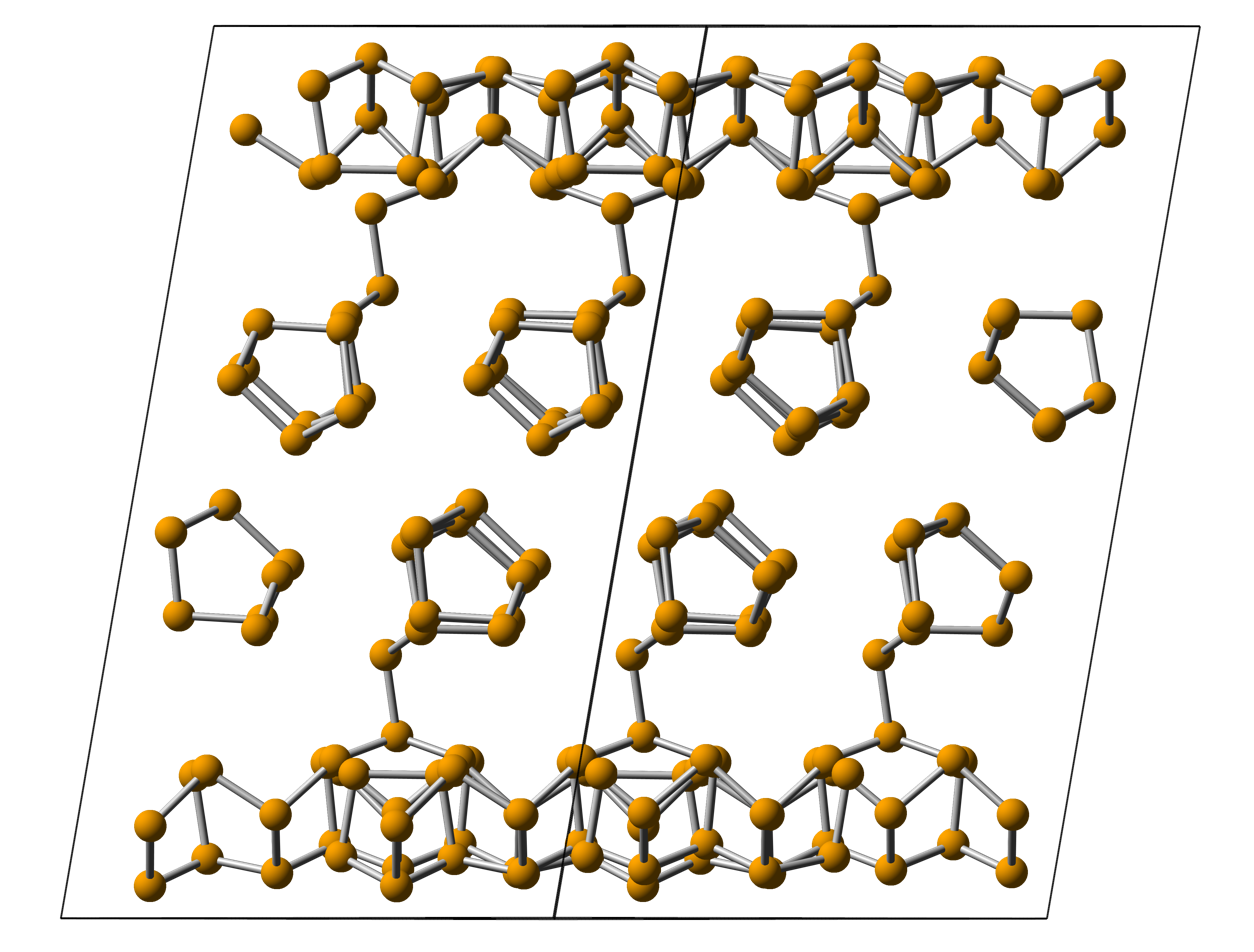
Violet

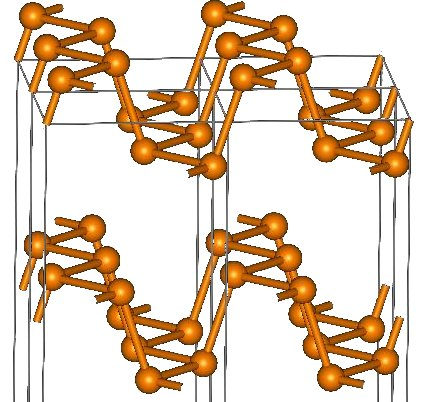
Black

Phosphorus has several allotropes that exhibit very diverse properties. The most useful and therefore common is white phosphorus, followed by red phosphorus. The two other main allotropes, violet and black phosphorus, have either a more fundamental interest or specialised applications. Many other allotropes have been theorised and synthesised, with the search for new materials an active area of research. Commonly mentioned "yellow phosphorus" is not an allotrope, but a result of the gradual degradation of white phosphorus into red phosphorus, accelerated by light and heat. This causes white phosphorus that is aged or otherwise impure (e.g. weapons-grade) to appear yellow.

White phosphorus is a soft, waxy molecular solid that is insoluble in water. It is also very toxic, highly flammable and pyrophoric, igniting in air at about 30 °C (303 K). Structurally, it is composed of P_{4} tetrahedra. The nature of bonding in a given P_{4} tetrahedron can be described by spherical aromaticity or cluster bonding, that is the electrons are highly delocalized. This has been illustrated by calculations of the magnetically induced currents, which sum up to 29 nA/T, much more than in the archetypical aromatic molecule benzene (11 nA/T). The P_{4} molecule in the gas phase has a P-P bond length of 2.1994(3) Å as determined by gas electron diffraction. White phosphorus exists in two crystalline forms named α (alpha) and β (beta), differing in terms of the relative orientation of the constituent P_{4} tetrahedra. The α-form is most stable at room temperature and has a cubic crystal structure. When cooled down to 195.2 K (−78.0 °C) it transforms into the β-form, turning into an hexagonal crystal structure. When heated up, the tetrahedral structure is conserved after melting at 317.3 K (44.2 °C) and boiling at 553.7 K (280.6 °C), before facing thermal decomposition at 1,100 K (830 °C) where it turns into gaseous diphosphorus (P_{2}). This molecule contains a triple bond and is analogous to N_{2}; it can also be generated as a transient intermediate in solution by thermolysis of organophosphorus precursor reagents. At still higher temperatures, P_{2} dissociates into atomic P.

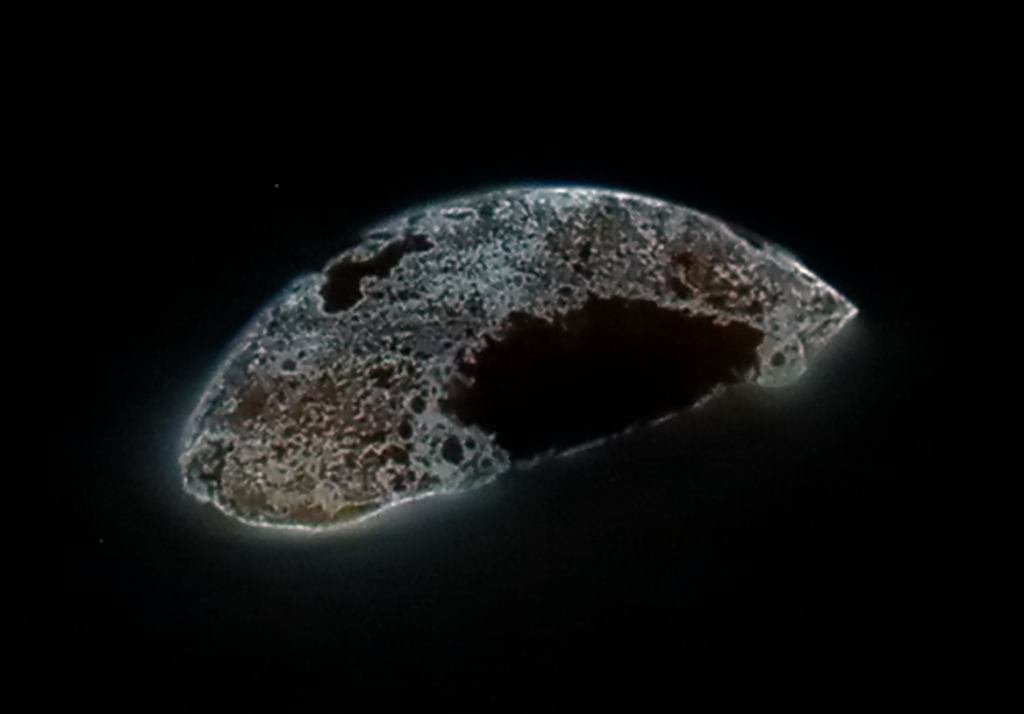
White phosphorus exposed to air glows in the dark.

When exposed to air, white phosphorus faintly glows green and blue due to oxidation, a phenomenon best visible in the dark. This reaction with oxygen takes place at the surface of the solid (or liquid) phosphorus, forming the short-lived molecules HPO and P_{2}O_{2} that both emit visible light. However, in a pure-oxygen environment phosphorus does not glow at all, with the oxidation happening only in a range of partial pressures. Derived from this phenomenon, the terms phosphors and phosphorescence have been loosely used to describe substances that shine in the dark. However, phosphorus itself is not phosphorescent but chemiluminescent, since it glows due to a chemical reaction and not the progressive reemission of previously absorbed light.

Red phosphorus is polymeric in structure. It can be viewed as a derivative of P_{4} wherein one P-P bond is broken and one additional bond is formed with the neighbouring tetrahedron, resulting in chains of P_{21} molecules linked by van der Waals forces. Red phosphorus may be formed by heating white phosphorus to 250 °C (523 K) in the absence of air or by exposing it to sunlight. In this form phosphorus is amorphous, but can be crystallised upon further heating into violet phosphorus or fibrous red phosphorus depending on the reaction conditions. Red phosphorus is therefore not an allotrope in the strictest sense of the term, but rather an intermediate between other crystalline allotropes of phosphorus, and consequently most of its properties have a range of values. Freshly prepared, bright red phosphorus is highly reactive and ignites at about 300 °C (573 K). After prolonged heating or storage, the color darkens; the resulting product is more stable and does not spontaneously ignite in air.

Violet phosphorus or α-metallic phosphorus can be produced by day-long annealing of red phosphorus above 550 °C (823 K). In 1865, Johann Wilhelm Hittorf discovered that when phosphorus was recrystallised from molten lead, a red/purple form is obtained. Therefore, this form is sometimes known as "Hittorf's phosphorus" .

Black phosphorus or β-metallic phosphorus is the least reactive allotrope and the thermodynamically stable form below 550 °C (823 K). In appearance, properties, and structure, it resembles graphite, being black and flaky, a conductor of electricity, and having puckered sheets of linked atoms. It is obtained by heating white phosphorus under high pressures (about 12,000 standard atmospheres or 1.2 gigapascals). It can also be produced at ambient conditions using metal salts, e.g. mercury, as catalysts. Single-layer black phosphorus is called phosphorene, and is therefore predictably analogous to graphene.

=== Natural occurrence ===
Phosphorus has a concentration in the Earth's crust of about one gram per kilogram (for comparison, copper is found at about 0.06 grams per kilogram). It is not found free in nature, but is widely distributed in many minerals, usually as phosphates. Inorganic phosphate rock, which is partially made of apatite, is today the chief commercial source of this element.

In 2013, astronomers detected phosphorus in Cassiopeia A, which confirmed that this element is produced in supernovae as a byproduct of supernova nucleosynthesis. The phosphorus-to-iron ratio in material from the supernova remnant could be up to 100 times higher than in the Milky Way in general. In 2020, astronomers analysed ALMA and ROSINA data from the massive star-forming region AFGL 5142, to detect phosphorus-bearing molecules and how they could have been carried in comets to the early Earth.

== Compounds ==
=== Inorganic phosphates ===
==== Phosphoric acids ====
The most prevalent compounds of phosphorus are derivatives of phosphate (PO^{3−}_{4}), a tetrahedral anion. Phosphate is the conjugate base of phosphoric acid, which is produced on a massive scale for use in fertilisers. Being triprotic, phosphoric acid converts stepwise to three conjugate bases:

H_{3}PO_{4} + H_{2}O ⇌ H_{3}O^{+} + H_{2}PO^{−}_{4} (K_{a1} = 7.25×10^{−3})
H_{2}PO^{−}_{4} + H_{2}O ⇌ H_{3}O^{+} + HPO^{2−}_{4} (K_{a2} = 6.31×10^{−8})
HPO^{2−}_{4} + H_{2}O ⇌ H_{3}O^{+} + PO^{3−}_{4} (K_{a3} = 3.98×10^{−13})

Food-grade phosphoric acid (additive E338) is used to acidify foods and beverages such as various colas and jams, providing a tangy or sour taste. The phosphoric acid also serves as a preservative. Soft drinks containing phosphoric acid, including Coca-Cola, are sometimes called phosphate sodas or phosphates. Phosphoric acid in soft drinks has the potential to cause dental erosion, as well as contribute to the formation of kidney stones, especially in those who have had kidney stones previously.

==== Metal salts ====
With metal cations, phosphate forms a variety of salts. These solids are polymeric, featuring P-O-M linkages. When the metal cation has a charge of 2+ or 3+, the salts are generally insoluble, hence they exist as common minerals. Many phosphate salts are derived from hydrogen phosphate (HPO^{2−}_{4}).

Calcium phosphates in particular are widespread compounds with many applications. Among them, they are used to improve the characteristics of processed meat and cheese, in baking powder, and in toothpaste. Two of the most relevant among them are monocalcium phosphate, and dicalcium phosphate.

==== Polyphosphates ====
Phosphate exhibits a tendency to form chains and rings containing P-O-P bonds. Many polyphosphates are known, including ATP. Polyphosphates arise by dehydration of hydrogen phosphates such as HPO^{2−}_{4} and H_{2}PO^{−}_{4}. For example, the industrially important pentasodium triphosphate (also known as sodium tripolyphosphate, STPP) is produced industrially by the megatonne by this condensation reaction:

2 Na_{2}HPO_{4} + NaH_{2}PO_{4} → Na_{5}P_{3}O_{10} + 2 H_{2}O

Sodium triphosphate is used in laundry detergents in some countries, but banned for this use in others. This compound softens the water to enhance the performance of the detergents and to prevent pipe and boiler tube corrosion.

==== Oxoacids ====
Phosphorus oxoacids are extensive, often commercially important, and sometimes structurally complicated. They all have acidic protons bound to oxygen atoms, some have nonacidic protons that are bonded directly to phosphorus and some contain phosphorus–phosphorus bonds. Although many oxoacids of phosphorus are formed, only nine are commercially important. Among them, hypophosphorous, phosphorous and orthophosphoric acid are particularly important.

Oxidation state	Formula	Name	Acidic protons	Compounds
+1	H_{3}PO_{2}	hypophosphorous acid	1	acid, salts
+3	H_{3}PO_{3}	phosphorous acid (phosphonic acid)	2	acid, salts
+3	HPO_{2}	metaphosphorous acid	1	salts
+4	H_{4}P_{2}O_{6}	hypophosphoric acid	4	acid, salts
+5	(HPO_{3})_{n}	metaphosphoric acids	n	salts (n = 3,4,6)
+5	H(HPO_{3})_{n}OH	polyphosphoric acids	n+2	acids, salts (n = 1-6)
+5	H_{5}P_{3}O_{10}	tripolyphosphoric acid	5	salts
+5	H_{4}P_{2}O_{7}	pyrophosphoric acid	4	acid, salts
+5	H_{3}PO_{4}	(ortho)phosphoric acid	3	acid, salts

=== Other inorganic compounds ===
==== Oxides and sulfides ====
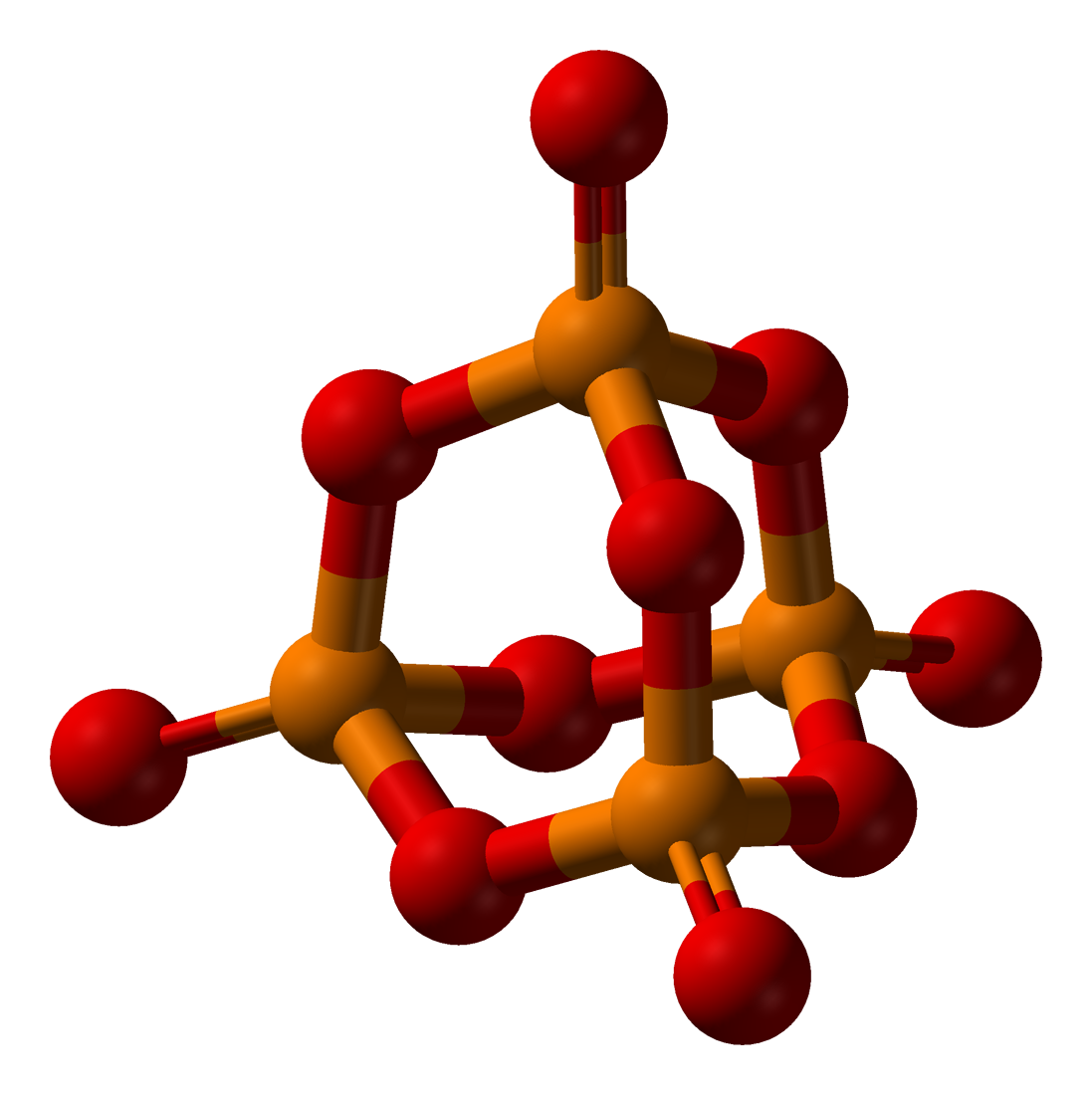
The tetrahedral structure of P_{4}O_{10} and P_{4}S_{10}

Phosphorus pentoxide (P_{4}O_{10}) is the acid anhydride of phosphoric acid, but several intermediates between the two are known. This waxy white solid reacts vigorously with water. Similarly, phosphorus trioxide (P_{4}O_{6}, also called tetraphosphorus hexoxide) is the anhydride of P(OH)_{3}, the minor tautomer of phosphorous acid. The structure of P_{4}O_{6} is like that of P_{4}O_{10} without the terminal oxide groups. Mixed oxyhalides and oxyhydrides of phosphorus(III) are almost unknown. Meanwhile, phosphorus forms a wide range of sulfides, where the phosphorus can be in P(V), P(III) or other oxidation states. However, only two of them are commercially significant. Phosphorus pentasulfide (P_{4}S_{10}) has a structure analogous to P_{4}O_{10}, and is used in the manufacture of additives and pesticides. The three-fold symmetric Phosphorus sesquisulfide (P_{4}S_{3}) is used in strike-anywhere matches.

==== Halides ====
Phosphorus halides can have as oxidation state +3 in the case of trihalides and +5 for pentahalides and chalcoalides, but also +2 for disphosphorus tetrahalides. All four symmetrical trihalides are well known: gaseous PF_{3}, the yellowish liquids PCl_{3} and PBr_{3}, and the solid PI_{3}. These materials are moisture sensitive, hydrolysing to give phosphorous acid. The trichloride, a common reagent used for the manufacture of pesticides, is produced by chlorination of white phosphorus. The trifluoride is produced from the trichloride by halide exchange. PF_{3} is toxic because it binds to haemoglobin.

Most phosphorus pentahalides are common compounds. PF_{5} is a colourless gas and the molecules have a trigonal bipyramidal geometry. With fluoride, it forms PF^{−}_{6}, an anion that is isoelectronic with SF_{6}. PCl_{5} is a colourless solid which has an ionic formulation of PCl^{+}_{4}PCl^{−}_{6}, but adopts a trigonal bipyramidal geometry when molten or in the vapour phase. Both the pentafluoride and the pentachloride are Lewis acids. Meanwhile, PBr_{5} is an unstable solid formulated as PBr^{+}_{4}Br^{−}. PI_{5} is not known.

The most important phosphorus oxyhalide is phosphorus oxychloride (POCl_{3}), which is approximately tetrahedral. It is prepared from PCl_{3} and used in the manufacture of plasticizers. Phosphorus can also form thiohalides such as PSCl_{3}, and in rare cases selenohalides.

==== Nitrides ====
The PN molecule phosphorus mononitride is considered unstable, but is a product of crystalline triphosphorus pentanitride decomposition at 1,100 K (830 °C). Similarly, H_{2}PN is considered unstable, and phosphorus nitride halogens like F_{2}PN, Cl_{2}PN, Br_{2}PN, and I_{2}PN oligomerise into cyclic polyphosphazenes. For example, compounds of the formula (PNCl_{2})_{n} exist mainly as rings such as the trimer hexachlorophosphazene. The phosphazenes arise by treatment of phosphorus pentachloride with ammonium chloride:

PCl_{5} + NH_{4}Cl → 1/n (NPCl_{2})_{n} + 4 HCl

When the chloride groups are replaced by alkoxide (RO^{−}), a family of polymers is produced with potentially useful properties.

==== Phosphides and phosphine ====
A wide variety of compounds which contain the containing the phosphide ion P^{3−} exist, both with main-group elements and with metals. They often exhibit complex structures, where phosphorus has the −3 oxidation state. Metal phosphides arise by reaction of metals with red phosphorus. The alkali metals (group 1) and alkaline earth metals (group 2) can also form compounds such as Na_{3}P_{7}. These compounds react with water to form phosphine. Some phosphide minerals are also known, like (Fe,Ni)_{2}P and (Fe,Ni)_{3}P, but they are very rare on Earth, most instances occurring in iron-nickel meteorites.

Phosphine (PH_{3}) and its organic derivatives are structural analogues of ammonia (NH_{3}), but the bond angles at phosphorus are closer to 90° for phosphine and its organic derivatives. It is an ill-smelling and toxic gas, produced by hydrolysis of calcium phosphide (Ca_{3}P_{2}). Unlike ammonia, phosphine is oxidised by air. Phosphine is also far less basic than ammonia. Other phosphines are known which contain chains of up to nine phosphorus atoms and have the formula P_{n}H_{n+2}. The highly flammable gas diphosphine (P_{2}H_{4}) is an analogue of hydrazine.

=== Organophosphorus compounds ===
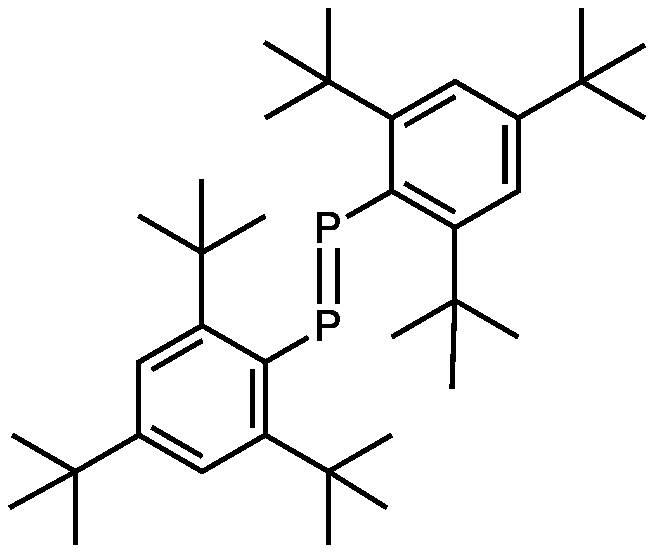
A stable diphosphene, a derivative of phosphorus(I)

==== Phosphines, phosphites and organophosphates ====
Compounds with P-C and P-O-C bonds are often classified as organophosphorus compounds. They are widely used commercially. The P^{3+} serves as a source of PCl_{3} in routes to organophosphorus(III) compounds. For example, it is the precursor to triphenylphosphine:

PCl_{3} + 6 Na + 3 C_{6}H_{5}Cl → P(C_{6}H_{5})_{3} + 6 NaCl

Treatment of phosphorus trihalides with alcohols and phenols gives phosphites, e.g. triphenylphosphite:

PCl_{3} + 3 C_{6}H_{5}OH → P(OC_{6}H_{5})_{3} + 3 HCl

Similar reactions occur for phosphorus oxychloride, affording triphenylphosphate:

OPCl_{3} + 3 C_{6}H_{5}OH → OP(OC_{6}H_{5})_{3} + 3 HCl

Some organophosphates are used as flame retardants. Among them, tricresyl phosphate and 2-ethylhexyl diphenyl phosphate are also plasticisers, making these two properties useful in the production of non-flammable plastic products and derivatives.

While many organic compounds of phosphorus are required for life, some are highly toxic. A wide range of organophosphorus compounds are used for their toxicity as pesticides and weaponised as nerve agents. Some notable examples include sarin, VX or Tabun. Fluorophosphate esters (like sarin) are among the most potent neurotoxins known.

==== Thioesters ====
Symmetric phosphorus(III) trithioesters (e.g. P(SMe)_{3}) can be produced from the reaction of white phosphorus and the corresponding disulfide, or phosphorus(III) halides and thiolates. Unlike the corresponding esters, they do not undergo a variant of the Michaelis-Arbuzov reaction with electrophiles. Instead, they revert to another phosphorus(III) compound through a sulfonium intermediate.

==== Phosphorus(I) and phosphorus(II) ====
These compounds generally feature P–P bonds. Examples include catenated derivatives of phosphine and organophosphines. Compounds containing P=P double bonds have also been observed, although they are rare.

== Biological role ==
=== Cells ===
Inorganic phosphorus in the form of the phosphate PO^{3−}_{4} is required for all known forms of life. Phosphorus plays a major role in the structural framework of DNA and RNA. Living cells use phosphate to transport cellular energy with adenosine triphosphate (ATP), necessary for every cellular process that uses energy. ATP is also important for phosphorylation, a key regulatory event in cells. Every living cell is encased in a membrane that separates it from its surroundings. Cellular membranes are composed of a phospholipid matrix and proteins, typically in the form of a bilayer. Phospholipids are derived from glycerol with two of the glycerol hydroxyl (OH) protons replaced by fatty acids as an ester, and the third hydroxyl proton has been replaced with phosphate bonded to another alcohol.

=== Bone and teeth enamel ===
The main component of bone is hydroxyapatite as well as amorphous forms of calcium phosphate, possibly including carbonate. Hydroxyapatite is the main component of tooth enamel. Water fluoridation enhances the resistance of teeth to decay by the partial conversion of this mineral to the still harder material fluorapatite:

Ca_{5}(PO_{4})_{3}OH + F^{−} → Ca_{5}(PO_{4})_{3}F + OH^{−}

An average adult human contains about 0.7 kilograms (1.5 lb) of phosphorus, about 85–90% in bones and teeth in the form of apatite, and the remainder in soft tissues and extracellular fluids. The phosphorus content increases from about 0.5% by mass in infancy to 0.65–1.1% by mass in adults. In comparison, average phosphorus concentration in the blood is about 0.4 g/L; about 70% of that is organic and 30% inorganic phosphates.

=== Nutrition ===
The main food sources for phosphorus are the same as those containing protein, although proteins themselves do not contain phosphorus. For example, milk, meat, and soya typically also have phosphorus. Generally, if a diet includes sufficient protein and calcium, the amount of phosphorus is sufficient.

According to the U.S. Institute of Medicine, the estimated average requirement (EAR) for phosphorus for people ages 19 and up is 580 mg/day. The Recommended Dietary Allowance (RDA) is 700 mg/day. RDAs are higher than EARs so as to identify amounts that will cover people with higher-than-average requirements. RDA for pregnancy and lactation are also 700 mg/day. For people ages 1–18 years, the RDA increases with age from 460 to 1250 mg/day. As for safety, the IOM sets tolerable upper intake level for phosphorus at 4000 mg/day. Collectively, these values are referred to as the Dietary Reference Intake. The European Food Safety Authority (EFSA) refers to the collective set of information as Dietary Reference Values, with Population Reference Intake (PRI) instead of RDA, and Average Requirement instead of EAR. AI and UL are defined the same as in the United States. For people ages 15 and older, including pregnancy and lactation, the AI is set at 550 mg/day. For children ages 4–10, the AI is 440 mg/day, and for ages 11–17 it is 640 mg/day. These AIs are lower than the U.S. RDAs. In both systems, teenagers need more than adults. The EFSA reviewed the same safety question and decided that there was not sufficient information to set a UL.

Phosphorus deficiency may be caused by malnutrition, by failure to absorb phosphate, and by metabolic syndromes that draw phosphate from the blood (such as in refeeding syndrome after malnutrition) or passing too much of it into the urine. All are characterised by hypophosphatemia, which is a condition of low levels of soluble phosphate levels in the blood serum and inside the cells. Symptoms of hypophosphatemia include neurological dysfunction and disruption of muscle and blood cells due to lack of ATP. Too much phosphate can lead to diarrhoea and calcification (hardening) of organs and soft tissue, and can interfere with the body's ability to use iron, calcium, magnesium, and zinc.

== Phosphorus cycle ==
Phosphorus is an essential plant nutrient (the most often limiting nutrient, after nitrogen), and the bulk of all phosphorus production is in concentrated phosphoric acids for agriculture fertilisers, containing as much as 70% to 75% P_{2}O_{5}. That led to large increase in phosphate production in the second half of the 20th century. Artificial phosphate fertilisation is necessary because phosphorus is essential to all living organisms; it is involved in energy transfers, strength of root and stems, photosynthesis, the expansion of plant roots, formation of seeds and flowers, and other important factors effecting overall plant health and genetics. Heavy use of phosphorus fertilisers and their runoff have resulted in eutrophication (overenrichment) of aquatic ecosystems.

Natural phosphorus-bearing compounds are mostly inaccessible to plants because of the low solubility and mobility in soil. Most phosphorus is very stable in the soil minerals or organic matter of the soil. Even when phosphorus is added in manure or fertiliser it can become fixed in the soil. Therefore, the natural phosphorus cycle is very slow. Some of the fixed phosphorus is released again over time, sustaining wild plant growth, however, more is needed to sustain intensive cultivation of crops. Fertiliser is often in the form of superphosphate of lime, a mixture of calcium dihydrogen phosphate (Ca(H_{2}PO_{4})_{2}), and calcium sulfate dihydrate (CaSO_{4}·2H_{2}O) produced by reacting sulfuric acid and water with calcium phosphate.

Processing phosphate minerals with sulfuric acid to obtain fertiliser is a major industrial application of sulfuric acid and the most common industrial use of elemental sulfur.

== Production ==
=== Mining ===
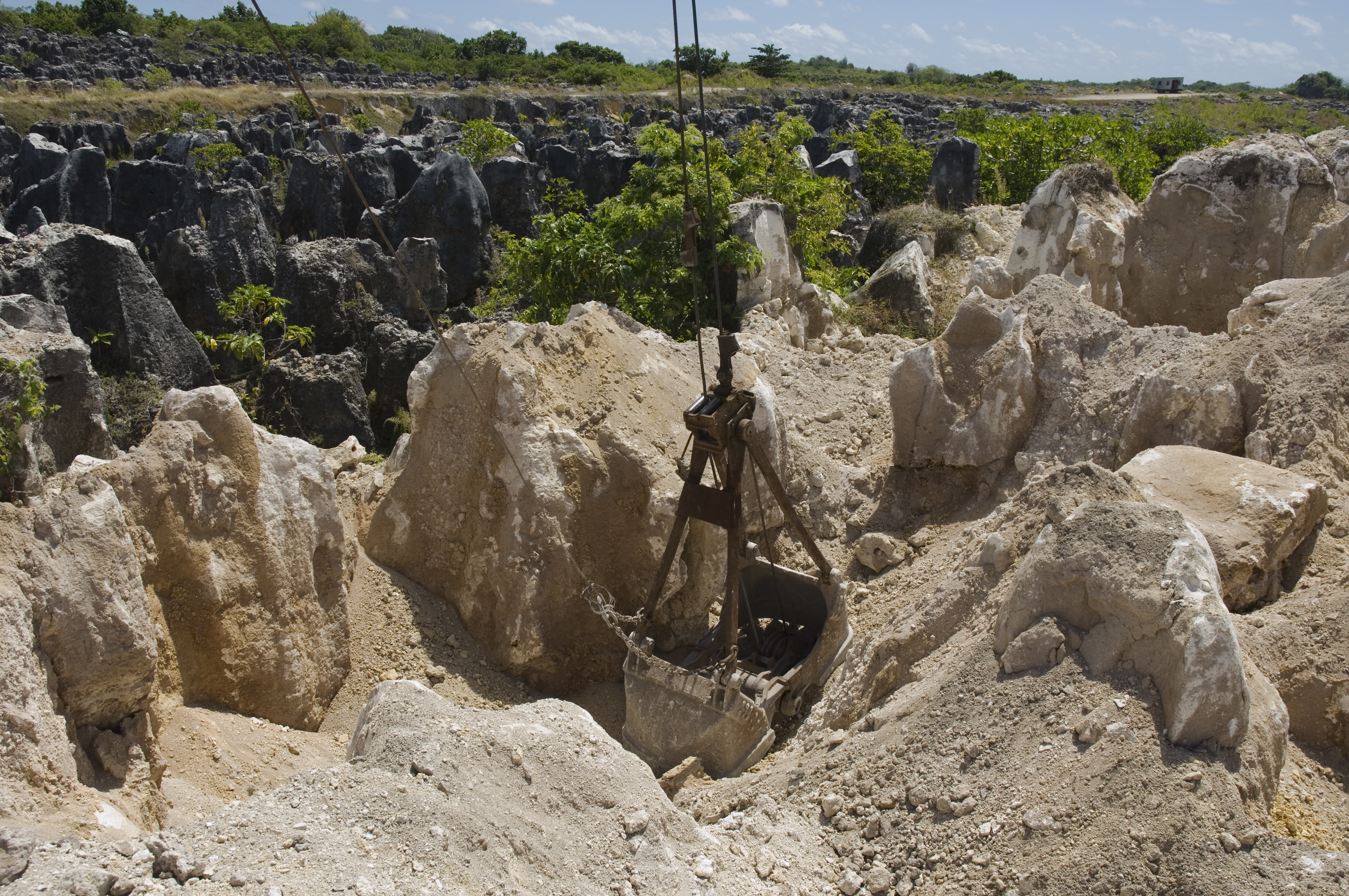
Mining of phosphate rock in Nauru

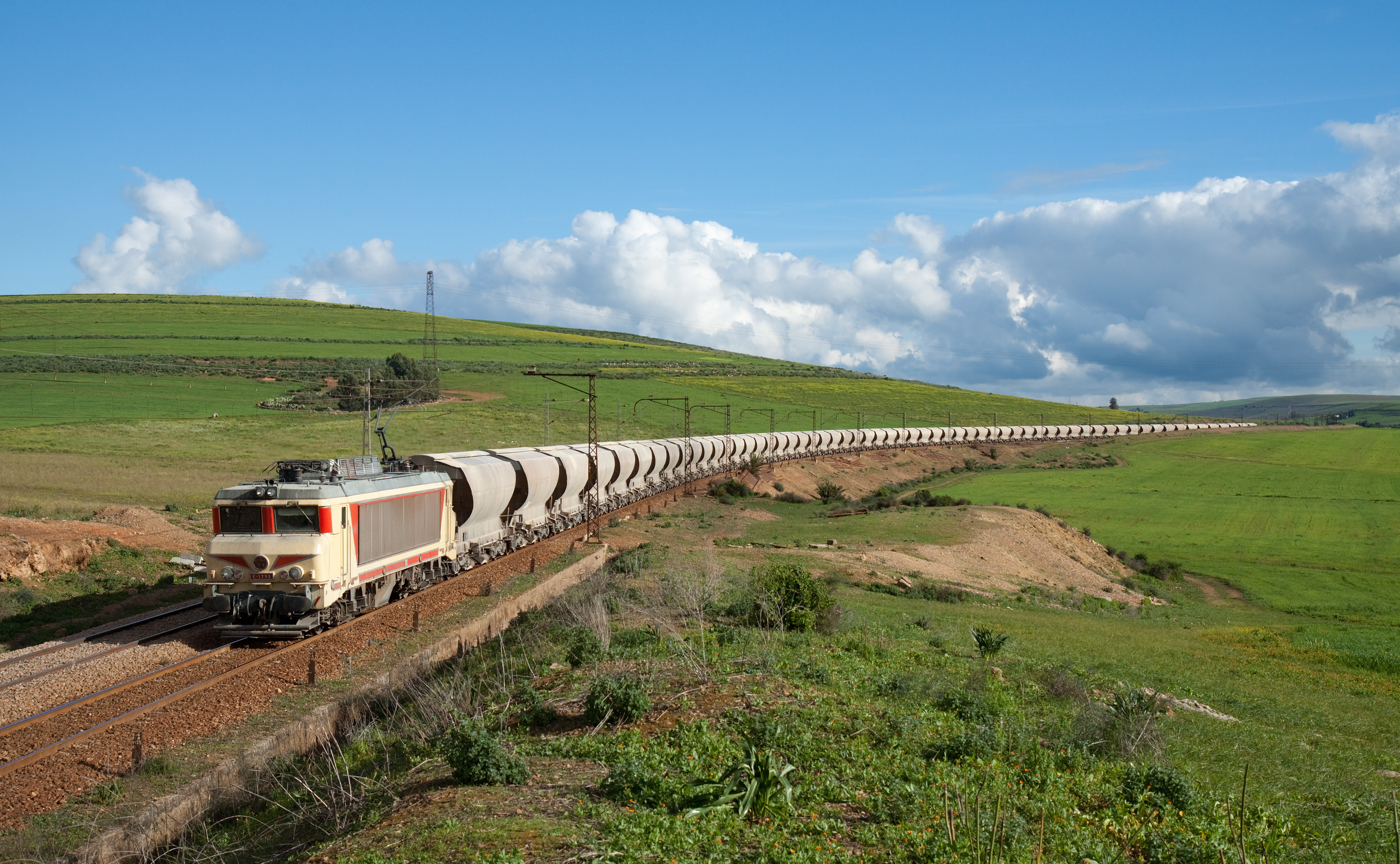
A phosphate train on its way to the port of Casablanca in Morocco.

Means of commercial phosphorus production besides mining are few because the phosphorus cycle does not include significant gas-phase transport. The predominant source of phosphorus in modern times is phosphate rock (as opposed to the guano that preceded it).

US production of phosphate rock peaked in 1980 at 54.4 million metric tons. The United States was the world's largest producer of phosphate rock from at least 1900, up until 2006, when US production was exceeded by that of China. In 2019, the US produced 10 percent of the world's phosphate rock.

=== Processing ===
Most phosphorus-bearing material is for agriculture fertilisers. In this case where the standards of purity are modest, phosphorus is obtained from phosphate rock by what is called the "wet process". The minerals are treated with sulfuric acid to give phosphoric acid. Phosphoric acid is then neutralised to give various phosphate salts, which comprise fertilisers. In the wet process, phosphorus does not undergo redox. About five tons of phosphogypsum waste are generated per ton of phosphoric acid production. Annually, the estimated generation of phosphogypsum worldwide is 100 to 280 Mt.

For the use of phosphorus in drugs, detergents, and foodstuff, the standards of purity are high, which led to the development of the thermal process. In this process, phosphate minerals are converted to white phosphorus, which can be purified by distillation. The white phosphorus is then oxidised to phosphoric acid and subsequently neutralised with a base to give phosphate salts. The thermal process is conducted in a submerged-arc furnace which is energy intensive. Presently, about 1,000,000 short tons (910,000 t) of elemental phosphorus is produced annually. Calcium phosphate (as phosphate rock), mostly mined in Florida and North Africa, can be heated to 1,200–1,500 °C with sand, which is mostly SiO_{2}, and coke to produce P_{4}. The P_{4} product, being volatile, is readily isolated:

4 Ca_{5}(PO_{4})_{3}F + 18 SiO_{2} + 30 C → 3 P_{4} + 30 CO + 18 CaSiO_{3} + 2 CaF_{2}
2 Ca_{3}(PO_{4})_{2} + 6 SiO_{2} + 10 C → 6 CaSiO_{3} + 10 CO + P_{4}

Side products from the thermal process include ferrophosphorus, a crude form of Fe_{2}P, resulting from iron impurities in the mineral precursors. The silicate slag is a useful construction material. The fluoride is sometimes recovered for use in water fluoridation. More problematic is a "mud" containing significant amounts of white phosphorus. Production of white phosphorus is conducted in large facilities in part because it is energy intensive. The white phosphorus is transported in molten form. Some major accidents have occurred during transportation.

=== Reserves ===
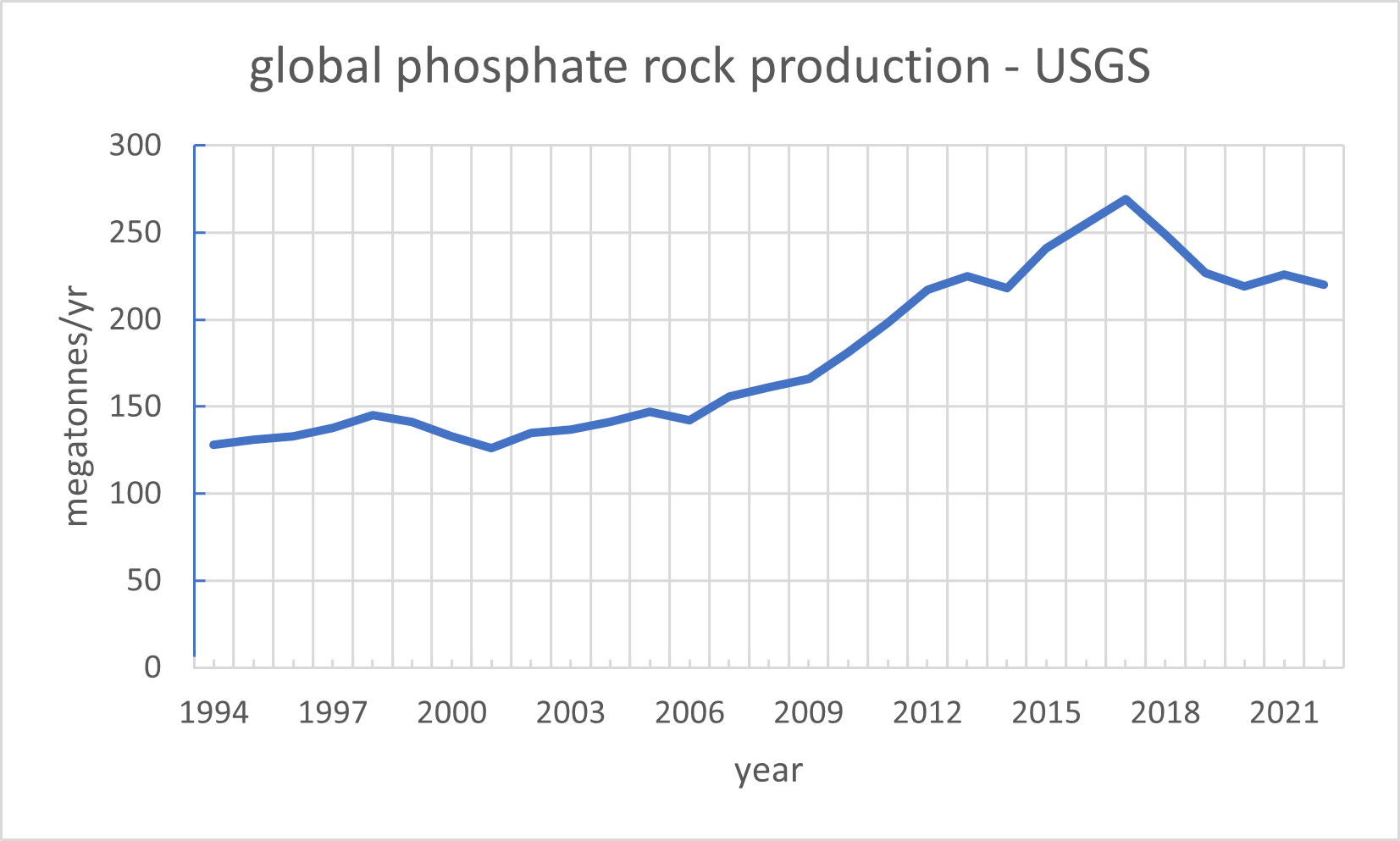
Annual global phosphate rock production (megatonnes per yr), 1994–2022 (data from US Geological Survey)

Phosphorus comprises about 0.1% by mass of the Earth's crust. However, only concentrated forms collectively referred to as phosphate rock or phosphorite are exploitable, and are not evenly distributed across the Earth. Unprocessed phosphate rock has a concentration of 1.7–8.7% phosphorus by mass (4–20% phosphorus pentoxide). The world's total commercial phosphate reserves and resources are estimated in amounts of phosphate rock, which in practice includes over 300 ores of different origin, composition, and phosphate content. "Reserves" refers to the amount assumed recoverable at current market prices and "resources" refers to estimated amounts of such a grade or quality that they have reasonable prospects for economic extraction. Mining is currently the only cost-effective method for the production of phosphorus. Hence, a shortage in rock phosphate or significant price increases might negatively affect the world's food security.

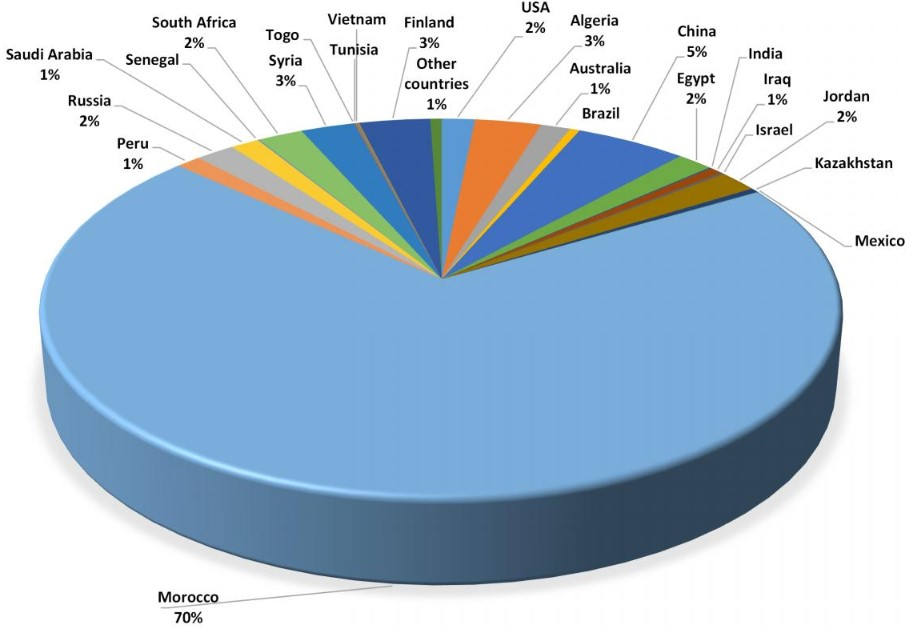
Global distribution of commercial reserves of rock phosphate in 2016

The countries estimated to have the biggest phosphate rock commercial reserves (in billion metric tons) are Morocco (50), China (3.2), Egypt (2.8), Algeria (2.2), Syria (1.8), Brazil (1.6), Saudi Arabia (1.4), South Africa (1.4), Australia (1.1), United States (1.0), and Finland (1.0). Estimates for future production vary significantly depending on modelling and assumptions on extractable volumes, but it is inescapable that future production of phosphate rock will be heavily influenced by Morocco in the foreseeable future. Extensive phosphate rock deposits have also been discovered in Norway in 2023. Before these discoveries, Earth's commercial and affordable phosphorus reserves were expected to be depleted in 50–100 years.

In 2023, the United States Geological Survey (USGS) estimated that economically extractable phosphate rock reserves worldwide are 72 billion tons, while world mining production in 2022 was 220 million tons. Assuming zero growth, the reserves would thus last for around 300 years. This broadly confirms a 2010 International Fertilizer Development Center (IFDC) report that global reserves would last for several hundred years. Phosphorus reserve figures are intensely debated. Gilbert suggest that there has been little external verification of the estimate. A 2014 review concluded that the IFDC report "presents an inflated picture of global reserves, in particular those of Morocco, where largely hypothetical and inferred resources have simply been relabeled "reserves".

=== Conservation and recycling ===
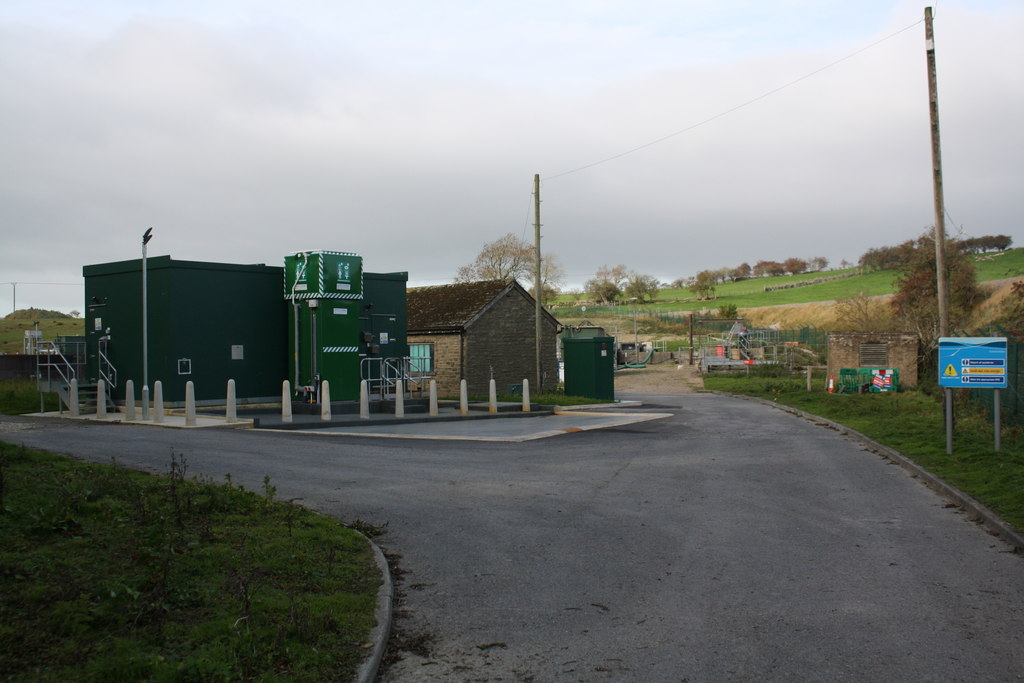
A phosphate removal sewage treatment station in Yorkshire, England

Reducing agricultural runoff and soil erosion can slow the frequency with which farmers have to reapply phosphorus to their fields. Agricultural methods such as no-till farming, terracing, contour tilling, and the use of windbreaks have been shown to reduce the rate of phosphorus depletion from farmland, though do not completely remove the need for periodic fertiliser application. Strips of grassland or forest between arable land and rivers can also greatly reduce losses of phosphate and other nutrients.

Sewage treatment plants that have a dedicated phosphorus removal step produce phosphate-rich sewage sludge that can then be treated to extract phosphorus from it. This is done by incinerating the sludge and recovering the resulting ash. Another approach lies into the recovery of phosphorus-rich materials such as struvite from waste processing plants, which is done by adding magnesium to the waste. However, the technologies currently in use are not yet cost-effective, given the current price of phosphorus on the world market.

== Applications ==
=== Matches ===
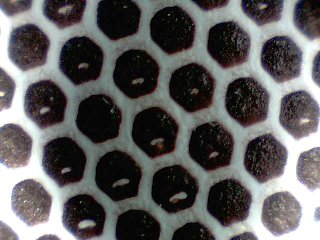
Match striking surface made of a mixture of red phosphorus, glue and ground glass. The glass powder is used to increase the friction.

Safety matches are very difficult to ignite on any surface other than a special striker strip. The strip contains non-toxic red phosphorus and the match head potassium chlorate, an oxygen-releasing compound. When struck, small amounts of abrasion from match head and striker strip are mixed intimately to make a small quantity of Armstrong's mixture, a very touch sensitive composition. The fine powder ignites immediately and provides the initial spark to set off the match head. Safety matches separate the two components of the ignition mixture until the match is struck. This is the key safety advantage as it prevents accidental ignition.

=== Military ===
Though military uses of white phosphorus are constrained by modern international law, white phosphorus munitions are still used for military applications, such as incendiary bombs, smoke screens, smoke bombs, and tracer ammunition.

=== Drug production ===
Elemental phosphorus can reduce elemental iodine to hydroiodic acid, which is a reagent effective for reducing ephedrine or pseudoephedrine to methamphetamine. For this reason, red and white phosphorus are listed in the United States as List I precursor chemicals by the Drug Enforcement Administration, and their handling is subject to stringent regulatory controls.

=== Metallurgical aspects ===
Phosphorus is also an important component in steel production, in the making of phosphor bronze, and in many other related products. Phosphorus is added to metallic copper during its smelting process to react with oxygen present as an impurity in copper and to produce phosphorus-containing copper (CuOFP) alloys with a higher hydrogen embrittlement resistance than normal copper. Phosphate conversion coating is a chemical treatment applied to steel parts to improve their corrosion resistance.

=== Semiconductors ===
Phosphorus is a dopant in N-type semiconductors used in high-power electronics and semiconductor detectors. In this context, phosphorus is not present at the start of the process, but rather created directly out of silicon during the manufacture of the devices. This is done by neutron transmutation doping, a method based on the conversion of the ^{30}Si into ^{31}P by neutron capture and beta decay as follows:
$$^{30}\mathrm{Si} \, (n,\gamma) \, ^{31}\mathrm{Si} \rightarrow \, ^{31}\mathrm{P} + \beta^- \; (T_{1/2} = 2.62 \mathrm{h})$$

In practice, the silicon is typically placed near or inside a nuclear reactor generating neutrons. As neutrons pass through the silicon, phosphorus atoms are produced by transmutation. This doping method is far less common than diffusion or ion implantation, but it has the advantage of creating an extremely uniform dopant distribution.

== Hazards ==
=== External contact ===
White phosphorus
Hazards
- GHS labelling
Pictograms	(GHS02: Flammable) (GHS05: Corrosive) (GHS06: Toxic) (GHS09: Environmental hazard)
Signal word	Danger
Hazard statements	H250, H300+H330, H314, H400
Precautionary statements	P210, P222, P260, P264, P270, P271, P273, P280, P284, P301+P310+P330, P301+P330+P331, P303+P361+P353, P304+P340+P310, P305+P351+P338+P310, P335+P334, P363, P370+P378, P391, P403+P233, P405, P422, P501
NFPA 704 (fire diamond)	4 4 2
Threshold limit value (TLV)	0.1 mg/m^{3}

Elemental phosphorus poses by far the greatest danger in its white form, red phosphorus being relatively nontoxic. In the past, external exposure to white phosphorus was treated by washing the affected area with 2% copper(II) sulfate solution to form harmless compounds that are then washed away. According to 2009 United States Navy guidelines:

Cupric (copper) sulfate has been used by U.S. personnel in the past and is still being used by some nations. However, copper sulfate is toxic and its use will be discontinued. Copper sulfate may produce kidney and cerebral toxicity as well as intravascular hemolysis.

Instead, the manual suggests:

[...] a bicarbonate solution to neutralise phosphoric acid, which will then allow removal of visible white phosphorus. Particles often can be located by their emission of smoke when air strikes them, or by their phosphorescence in the dark. In dark surroundings, fragments are seen as luminescent spots. Promptly debride the burn if the patient's condition will permit removal of bits of WP (white phosphorus) that might be absorbed later and possibly produce systemic poisoning. DO NOT apply oily-based ointments until it is certain that all WP has been removed. Following complete removal of the particles, treat the lesions as thermal burns.

=== Ingestion ===
Waxy yellow or white phosphorus is used as a rodenticide as well as in fireworks, fertilizer, and ammunition. Children may ingest phosphorus, mistaking it for toothpaste or when it is applied to bread to kill rodents. Lethal dosage is around 1 mg/kg. Symptoms occur in three stages: a day of vomiting, one to three days of no symptoms, and finally the onset of symptoms of acute liver failure and renal failure. There is no reliable diagnostic test for phosphorous poisoning and no known antidote.

=== Passive exposure ===
Chronic poisoning can lead to necrosis of the jaw. In the United States, exposure to 0.1 mg/m^{3} of white phosphorus over an 8-hour workday is set as the permissible exposure limit by the Occupational Safety and Health Administration and as the recommended exposure limit by the National Institute for Occupational Safety and Health. From 5 mg/m^{3}, it is considered immediately dangerous to life or health.
