= Isoelectronicity =

Identical electron configuration

Carbon monoxide molecule

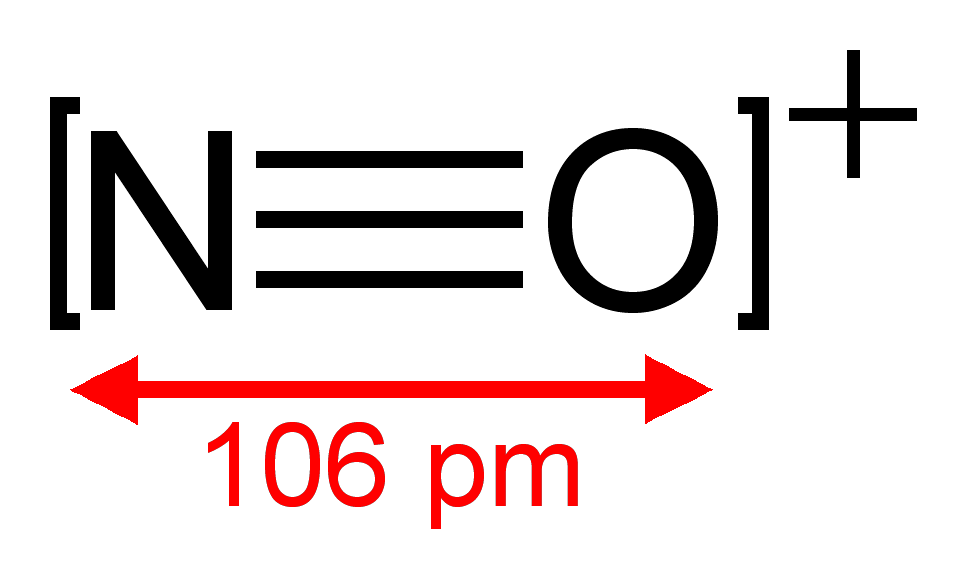
Nitrosonium ion

Carbon monoxide and nitrosonium are isoelectronic

Isoelectronicity is the property of two or more molecules that they have similar structure and electronic configurations in the following sense: they have the same structure (the same connectivities among atoms) and the same number of valence electrons, but differ in the specific chemical elements at some of the locations in the structure. Two or more molecules (or molecular entities such as atoms or ions) are said to be isoelectronic when they share these properties. For example, CO, NO^{+}, and N_{2} are isoelectronic because they consist of two bonded atoms and have ten valence electrons. Similarly, Na is isoelectronic with K because both are atoms having one valence electron. In contrast, CH_{3}C(=O)CH_{3} and CH_{3}N=NCH_{3} are not isoelectronic because they have different connectivities, and NO is not isoelectronic with CO because they differ in the number of valence electrons.

This property is sometimes termed valence isoelectronicity because only the valence electrons are considered. Some sources use a more strict definition of isoelectronicity by requiring equality of the total electron count, including core electrons. Other sources use definitions that are broader, and extend to allowing different numbers of atoms in the species being compared.

The importance of the concept lies in identifying significantly related species, as pairs or series. Isoelectronic species can be expected to show useful consistency and predictability in their properties, so identifying a compound as isoelectronic with one already characterised offers clues to possible properties and reactions. Differences in properties such as electronegativity of the atoms in isolelectronic species can affect reactivity.

In quantum mechanics, hydrogen-like atoms are ions with only one electron such as Li^{2+}. These ions would be described as being isoelectronic with hydrogen.

== Examples ==
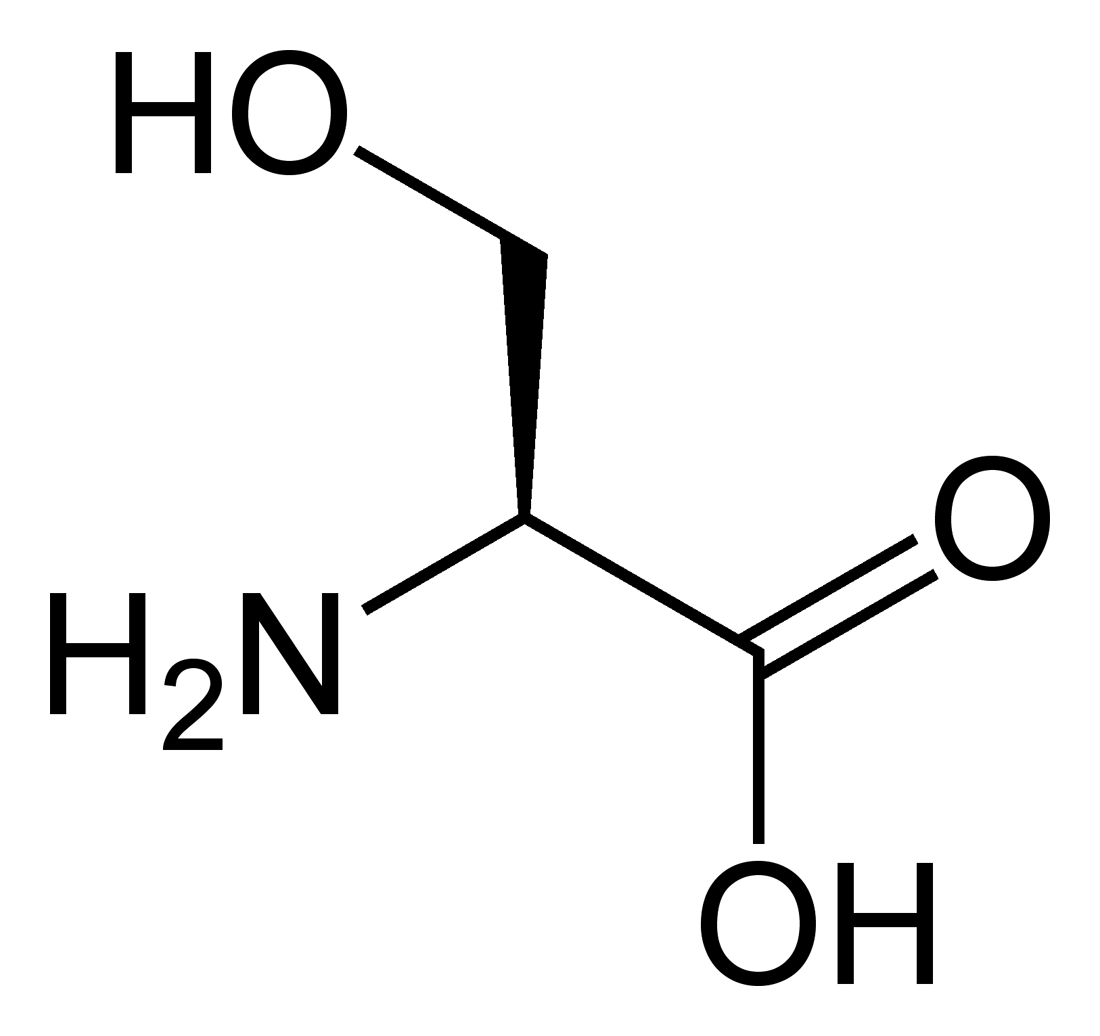
Serine

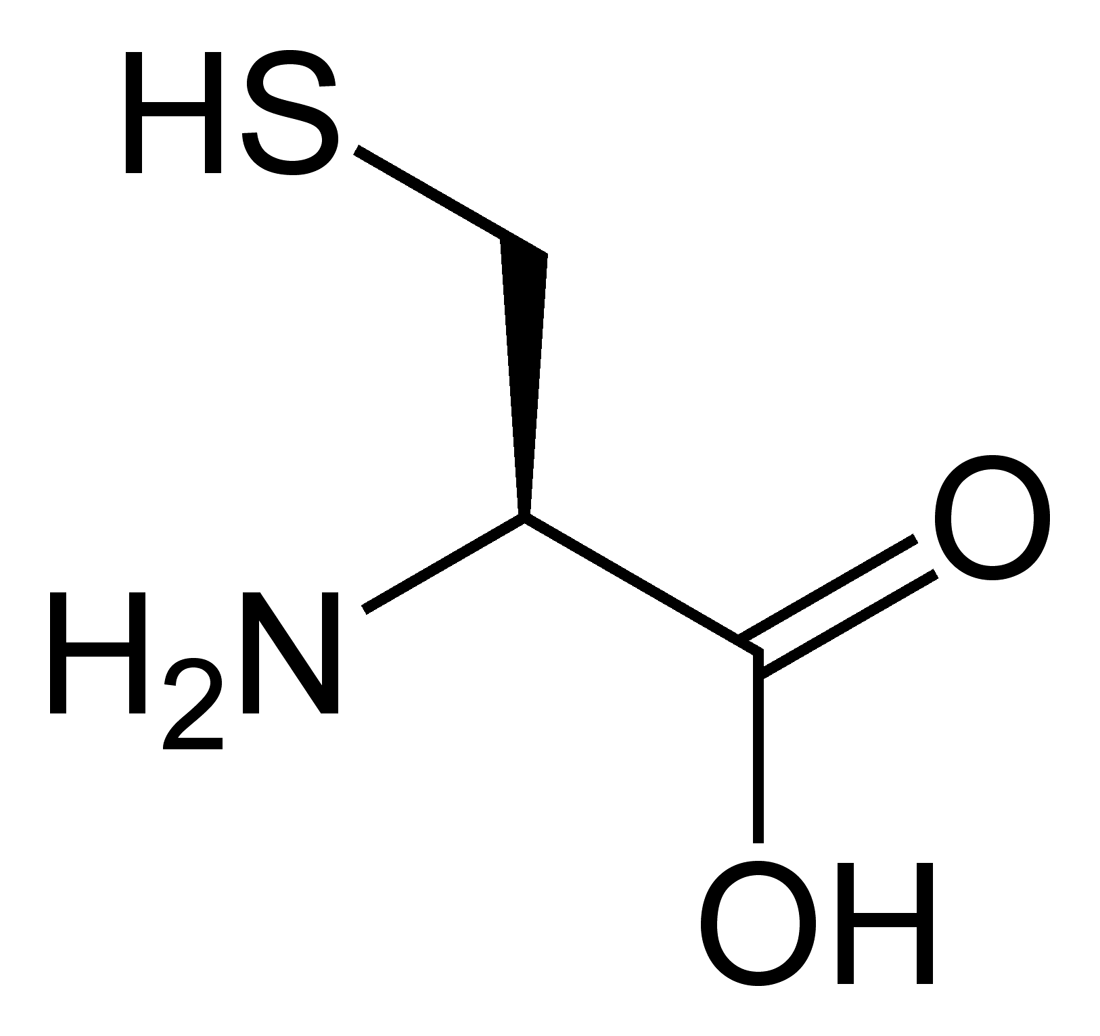
Cysteine

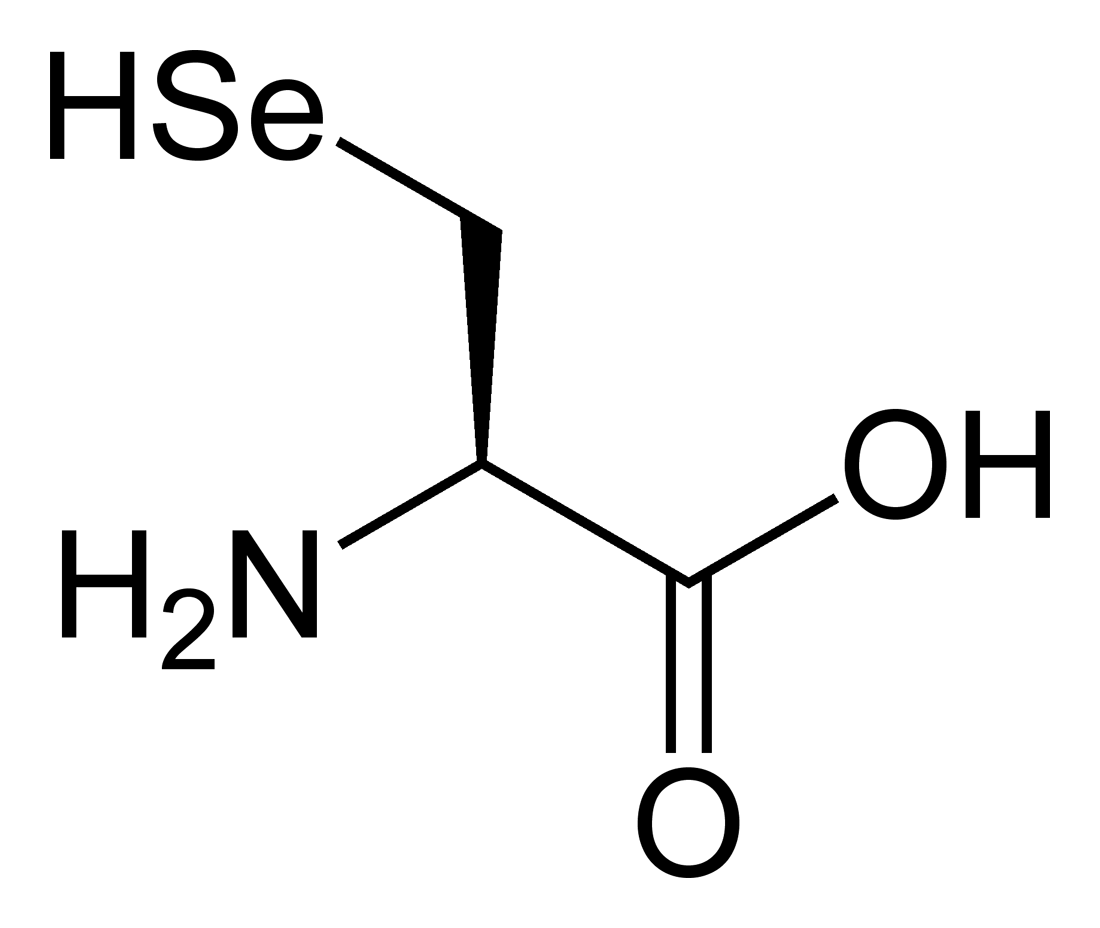
Selenocysteine

Three valence isoelectronic amino acids

Dimethyl ether

Azomethane

Both molecules have the same electron configuration, but due to the double bond and extra atom in azomethane, they are not isoelectronic

The N atom and the O^{+} ion are isoelectronic because each has five valence electrons, or more accurately an electronic configuration of [He] 2s^{2} 2p^{3}.

Similarly, the cations K^{+}, Ca^{2+}, and Sc^{3+} and the anions Cl^{−}, S^{2−}, and P^{3−} are all isoelectronic with the Ar atom.

CO, CN^{−}, N_{2}, and NO^{+} are isoelectronic because each has two atoms triple bonded together, and due to the charge have analogous electronic configurations (N^{−} is identical in electronic configuration to O so CO is identical electronically to CN^{−}).

Molecular orbital diagrams best illustrate isoelectronicity in diatomic molecules, showing how atomic orbital mixing in isoelectronic species results in identical orbital combination, and thus also bonding.

More complex molecules can be isoelectronic also. For example, the amino acids serine, cysteine, and selenocysteine are all valence isoelectronic to each other. They differ by which specific chalcogen is present at one location in the side-chain.

CH_{3}COCH_{3} (acetone) and CH_{3}N_{2}CH_{3} (azomethane) are not isoelectronic. They do have the same number of electrons but they do not have the same structure.

== See also ==
- Isolobal principle
