= Submerged-arc furnace for phosphorus production =

Process scheme

The Submerged-arc furnace for phosphorus production is a particular sub-type of electric arc furnace used to produce phosphorus and other products. Submerged arc furnaces are mainly used for the production of ferroalloys. The nomenclature submerged means that the furnace's electrodes are buried deep in the furnace burden. A reduction reaction takes place near the tip of the electrodes to facilitate the furnace's process.

== Main reaction ==
Large-scale production of phosphorus uses the Wöhler process. In this process, apatites (nearly always fluorapatite) are reduced in the presence of carbon (coke) and silica (gravel). This is performed in a submerged-arc furnace at temperatures of between 1150 and 1400C. The main internal reaction is described below:

Ca_{10}(PO_{4})_{6}F_{2} + 15C + 9SiO_{2} → 3P_{2}(g) + 9[(CaO•SiO_{2})] + CaF_{2} + 15CO(g)

This main reaction produces a liquid calcium silicates slag, carbon monoxide gas and the desired product, phosphorus gas.

This process also has intermediate reactions, and as such, the phosphate rock created has impurities. One such impurity—and the most important one—is iron oxide. Iron oxide impurities are reduced and form iron phosphides. The resulting second liquid product is called ferrophosphorus. Iron is considered an impurity and undesirable because it requires additional carbon and power for reduction. Thus, it locks up a certain percentage of the phosphorus.

Another impurity is alumina - this increases the slag bulk but reduces the melting point.

== Furnace Construction, Components and Features ==
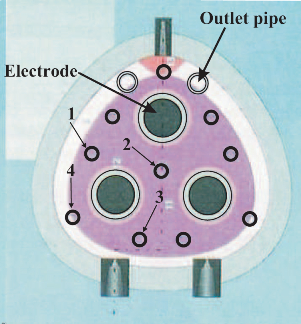
A top view of a submerged-arc furnace for phosphorus production

=== Furnace structure and individual components ===
A submerge-arc furnace's shell or casing is fabricated from steel. The lower part is lined with hard blocks of strongly calcined carbon, and the upper part with firebrick. The floor and lower section of the furnace are water-cooled. Three electrodes are placed at the angles of an equilateral triangle with rounded corners. These furnaces can be equipped with either pre-baked electrodes or Söderberg electrodes. The Söderberg electrodes are heated by the electric current and the furnace heat, then baked solid in the region of the contact clamps. The electrode must become baked solid over its entire cross section (inside the charge) when it is fed downwards to compensate for its consumption in the furnace (which is a few centimeters per hour).

If the electrodes are not completely baked, there is a risk of breakage, especially with long electrodes. Söderberg electrodes have a higher proportion of organic impurities when compared to the pre-baked electrodes. Thus, Söderberg electrode-equipped furnaces produce yellow phosphorus and pre-baked electrodes produce white phosphorus.

=== Furnace control ===
The electrode current is kept fairly constant during operation by automatically raising and lowering the electrodes. When current increases, the electrodes are raised, increasing the electrical resistance between the electrodes and the furnace floor. Hence reducing the current, produces the opposite effect when the voltage is kept constant.

Some furnaces are also controlled through either constant voltage or power. From one submerged-arc furnace, it is possible to produce several ferro alloys. Transformer voltage selection is based on future changeover of ferro alloys production.

=== Material flow ===
Gravity delivers the apatite ore, carbon (coke) and silica (gravel) to the submerged-arc furnace through feed chutes situated in the roof of the furnace. This ensures a constant packed bed volume. The gaseous product, a mixture of carbon monoxide and phosphorus gas, leaves the furnace through two symmetrically placed outlet vents situated above the ferrophosphorus tap hole in the roof of the furnace. The ferrophosphorus is tapped off, usually once per day. Slag, however, is continuously tapped through two alternating, water-cooled tap holes located 400 mm above the furnace floor. The feed material forms the major electrical and flow resistance of the smelting furnace circuit. As the feed materials descend towards the hot zone in the furnace, they start to soften and melt, significantly lowering the electrical resistance. A conductive path is thus provided between the electrodes where the Joule heating is released to attain the high temperatures and energy levels needed to effect the essential endothermic reactions.

=== Energy consumption ===
The energy in an industrial phosphorus furnace is distributed between heating up and melting of the material (≈ 40%) and chemical reactions (≈ 45%). Cooling losses (cooling water), electrical losses (Joule heating) and radiative heat losses account for the rest (≈ 15%).

== Maintenance and safety ==
The lifetime of a phosphorus furnace correlates with the durability of its carbon lining. However, new state of the lining does not require shutting down the furnace and completely emptying it in order to monitor the status of the lining. Monitoring is instead achieved by incorporating radioactive sources at points where erosion is known to occur.

Also, special thermocouples are inserted at various depths in the carbon bricks to continuously measure wall temperature. Wall temperature readings also serve as a maintenance tool, alerting the system to any irregularities. It is crucial to monitor the position of the wear line in order to avoid hot metal or slag from breaking through the lining and cause damage to the operators, the furnace and nearby equipment.

In addition, the gaseous product leaving a furnace mostly comprises out of phosphorus tetrahedron (P4) and carbon monoxide. It still needs to be purified of any dust and is typically sent to an electrostatic gas purification system.
