= Ferrophosphorus =

Iron alloy

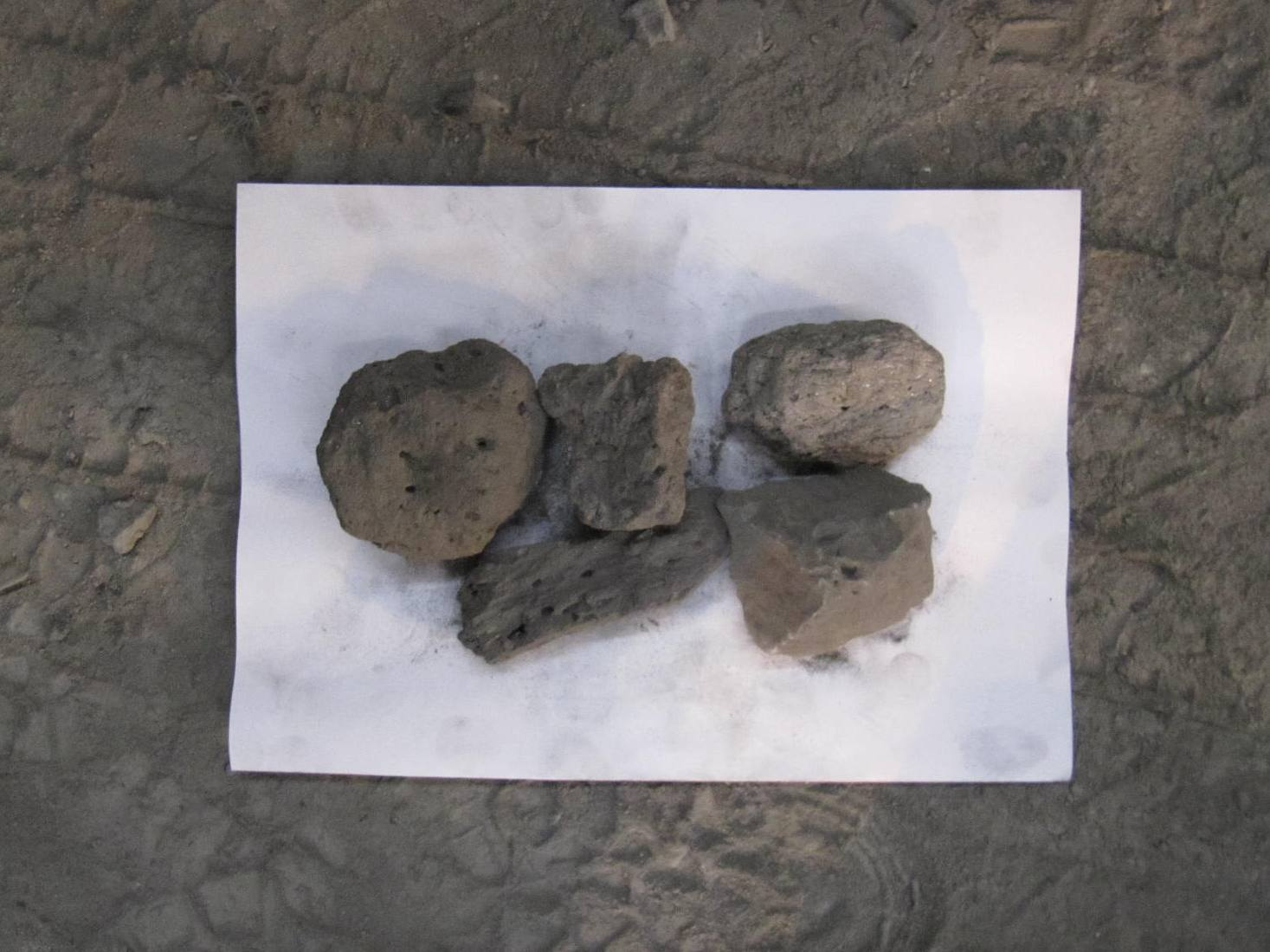

Ferrophosphorus is a ferroalloy, an alloy of iron and phosphorus. It contains high proportion of iron phosphides, Fe_{2}P and Fe_{3}P. Its CAS number is 8049-19-2. The usual grades contain either 18 or 25% of phosphorus. It is a gray solid material with melting point between 1050-1100 °C. It may liberate phosphine in contact with water. Very fine powder can be combustible.

== Formation ==
Ferrophosphorus is a byproduct of phosphorus production in submerged-arc furnaces from apatites, by their reduction with carbon. It is formed from the iron oxide impurities.

== Uses ==
=== Metallurgy ===
Ferrophosphorus is used in metallurgy as a source of phosphorus for alloying, for deoxidizing the melt and for removal of unwanted compounds into slag.

Addition of ferrophosphorus is used to produce powder metallurgy (P/M) steels with favorable magnetic properties, e.g. high saturation induction. Iron phosphide acts here as a solid solution hardener and a sintering aid. Usually about 0.45 w/o of phosphorus is added to iron; higher amount can improve magnetic properties but at above about 0.8 w/o the process parameters have to be too tightly controlled to prevent phosphorus segregation on grain boundaries and resulting excessive brittleness.

Ferrophosphorus can be added to cast iron, where the phosphorus improves fluidity and therefore quality of the castings, can increase wear resistance and cutability. In steels its addition to some alloys can improve corrosion resistance.

=== Reagent ===
Ferrophosphorus, reacted with sulfur or pyrite, is used for production of phosphorus pentasulfide.

Ferrophosphorus can be used for production of lithium iron phosphate, necessary as electrode material for LiFePO_{4} batteries.

Ferrophosphorus can be used as a reducing agent to produce sodium or potassium from sodium carbonate or potassium carbonate.

=== Other ===
Ferrophosphorus can be used as a construction aggregate for production of high-density concrete for radiation shielding, as an alternative to usually used steel punchings and shot. It can be used with both Portland cement and magnesia cement.

Ferrophosphorus can be used instead of zinc powder in some paints and coatings. It has good adhesion, anticorrosive properties, electrical and thermal conductivity, and wear resistance.
