= Azoxymethane =

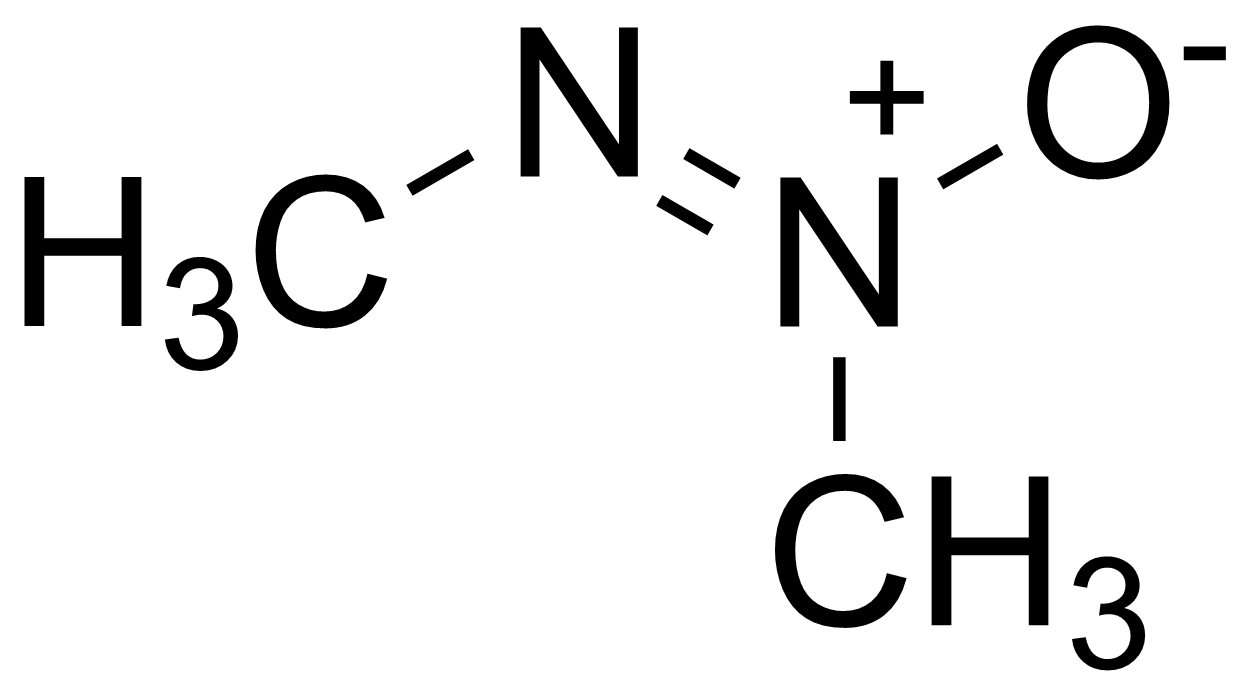

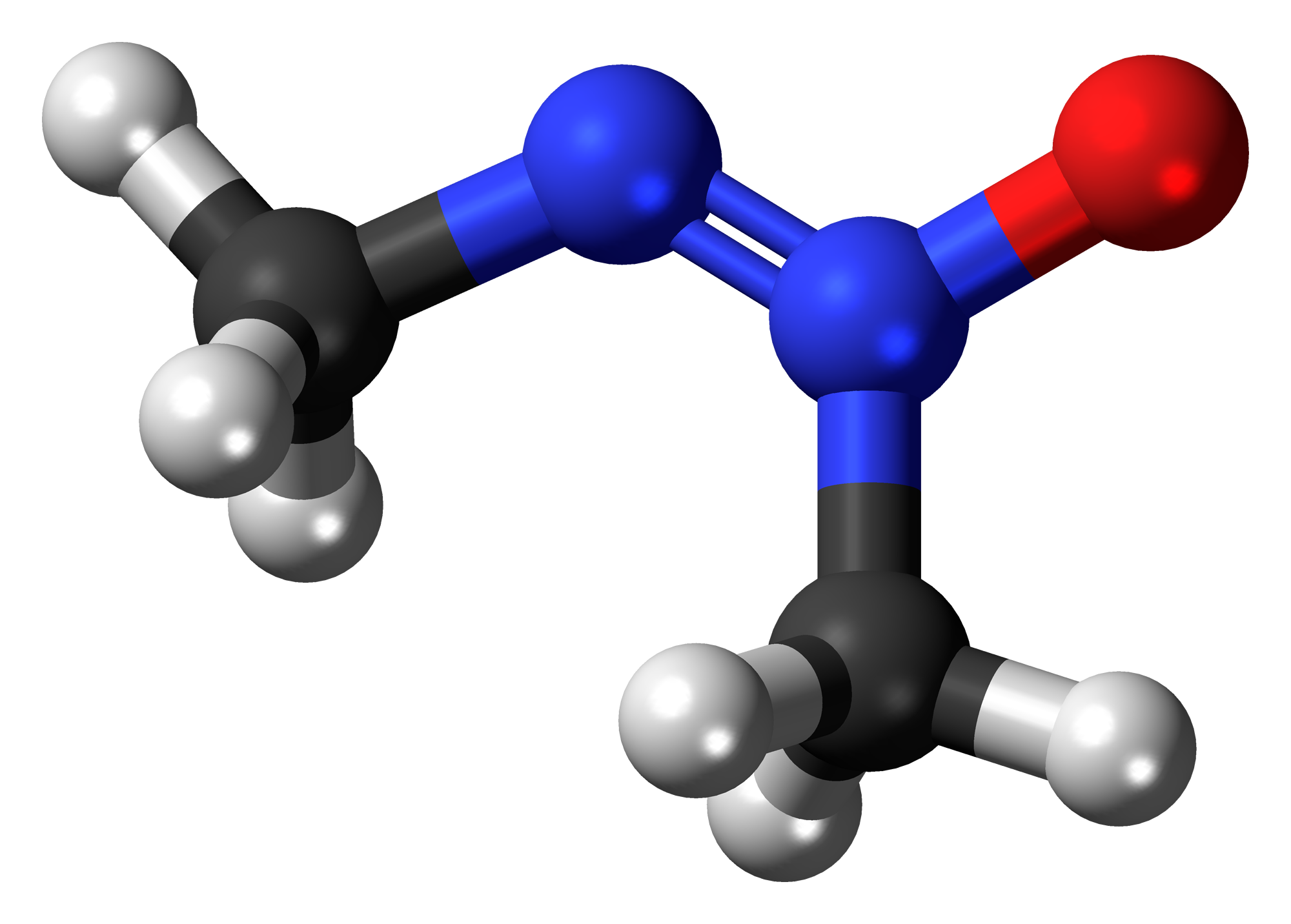

Names
- IUPAC name Methyl-methylimino-oxidoazanium
- Other names Dimethyldiazene-1-oxide

Identifiers
CAS Number	25843-45-2
3D model (JSmol)	Interactive image
ChemSpider	30663
ECHA InfoCard	100.149.573
EC Number	620-649-9
PubChem CID	33184
UNII	MO0N1J0SEN
CompTox Dashboard (EPA)	DTXSID3020124
- InChI: InChI=1S/C2H6N2O/c1-3-4(2)5/h1-2H3/b4-3+ Key: DGAKHGXRMXWHBX-ONEGZZNKSA-N; InChI=1/C2H6N2O/c1-3-4(2)5/h1-2H3/b4-3+ Key: DGAKHGXRMXWHBX-ONEGZZNKBY
- SMILES: [O-]/[N+](=N/C)C

Properties
Chemical formula	C_{2}H_{6}N_{2}O
Molar mass	74.083 g·mol^{−1}
Density	0.991 g/mL
Boiling point	97 to 99 °C (207 to 210 °F; 370 to 372 K)
- Except where otherwise noted, data are given for materials in their standard state (at 25 °C [77 °F], 100 kPa). verify (what is ?) Infobox references

Azoxymethane (AOM) is a carcinogenic and neurotoxic chemical compound used in biological research. It is the oxide of azomethane and is particularly effective for the induction of a colon carcinoma.
