= Symmetrical dimethylhydrazine =

- Skeletal formula of 1,2-dimethylhydrazine with all implicit hydrogens shown

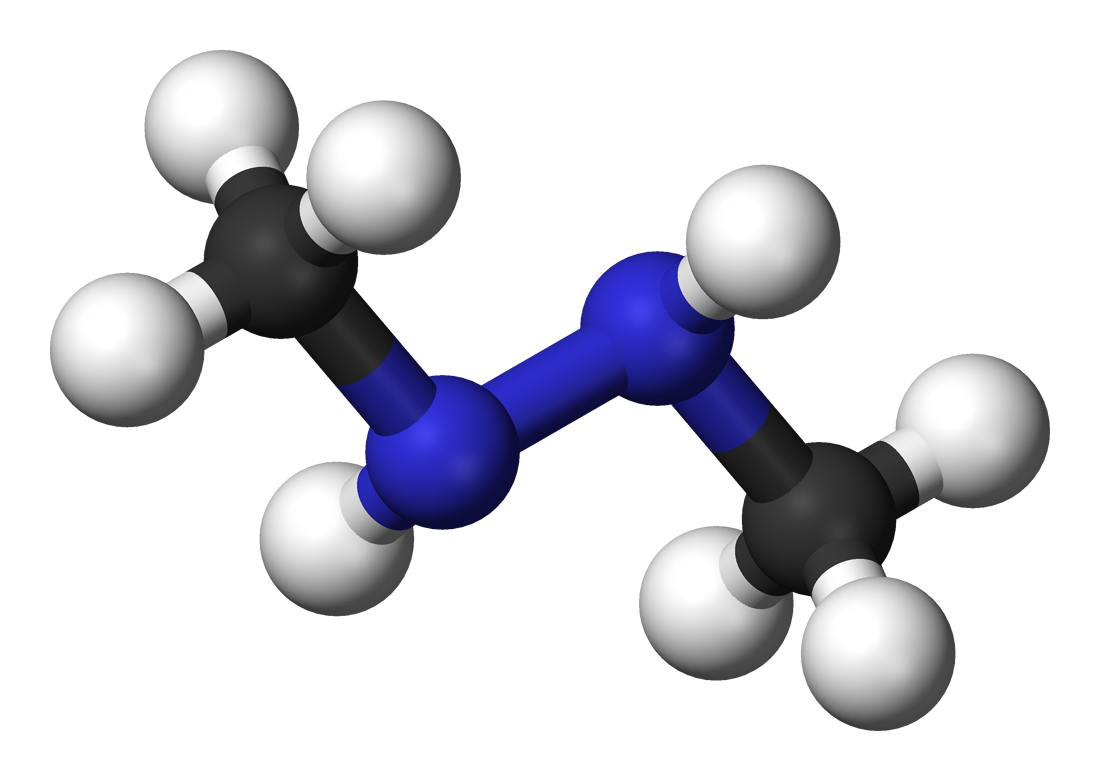
- Ball and stick model of 1,2-dimethylhydrazine

Names
- Preferred IUPAC name 1,2-Dimethylhydrazine
- Other names: N,N'-Dimethylhydrazine; sym-Dimethylhydrazine; Hydrazomethane

Identifiers
CAS Number	540-73-8
3D model (JSmol)	Interactive image
Abbreviations	SDMH
ChEBI	CHEBI:73755
ChEMBL	ChEMBL162921
ChemSpider	1282
ECHA InfoCard	100.149.162
KEGG	C19176
MeSH	1,2-Dimethylhydrazine
PubChem CID	1322
RTECS number	MV2625000
UNII	IX068S9745
UN number	2382
CompTox Dashboard (EPA)	DTXSID0041228
- InChI: InChI=1S/C2H8N2/c1-3-4-2/h3-4H,1-2H3 Key: DIIIISSCIXVANO-UHFFFAOYSA-N
- SMILES: CNNC

Properties
Chemical formula	C_{2}H_{8}N_{2}
Molar mass	60.100 g·mol^{−1}
Appearance	Colourless liquid
Odor	Fishy, ammoniacal
Density	827.4 kg m^{−3} (at 20 °C)
Melting point	−9 °C (16 °F; 264 K)
Boiling point	87 °C; 188 °F; 360 K
Solubility in water	Miscible

Thermochemistry
Heat capacity (C)	171.04 J K^{−1} mol^{−1}
Std molar entropy (S^{⦵}_{298})	199.15 J K^{−1} mol^{−1}
Std enthalpy of combustion (Δ_{c}H^{⦵}_{298})	−1987–−1978 kJ mol^{−1}

Hazards
- GHS labelling
Pictograms	(GHS06: Toxic) (GHS08: Health hazard) (GHS09: Environmental hazard)
Signal word	Danger
Hazard statements	H301, H311, H331, H350, H411
Precautionary statements	P201, P202, P261, P264, P270, P271, P273, P280, P281, P301+P310, P302+P352, P304+P340, P308+P313, P311, P312, P322, P330, P361, P363, P391, P403+P233, P405

Related compounds
Related compounds	Biurea; Daminozide
- Except where otherwise noted, data are given for materials in their standard state (at 25 °C [77 °F], 100 kPa). verify (what is ?) Infobox references

Symmetrical dimethylhydrazine (SDMH), or 1,2-dimethylhydrazine, is the organic compound with the formula (CH_{3}NH)_{2}. It is one of the two isomers of dimethylhydrazine. Both isomers are colourless liquids at room temperature, with properties like those of methylamines. Symmetrical dimethylhydrazine is a potent carcinogen that acts as a DNA methylating agent. The compound has no commercial value, in contrast to its isomer unsymmetrical dimethylhydrazine(1,1-dimethylhydrazine, UDMH), which is used as a rocket fuel. SDMH is more toxic than unsymmetrical dimethylhydrazine and is often considered an unwanted impurity in UDMH.

It is used to induce colon tumors in experimental animals, particularly mice and feline cell samples.

== Synthesis ==
The synthesis of symmetrical dimethylhydrazine is a two-step reaction. First N,N′-bis(ethoxycarbonyl)hydrazide is prepared by elimination of HCl from ethyl chloroformate (2 eq, R1) and hydrazine (1 eq, R1) in the presence of NaOH (2 eq, R1). Then the N,N′-bis(ethoxycarbonyl)hydrazide (1 eq, R2) is reduced by lithium aluminum hydride (6 eq, R2) to form symmetrical dimethylhydrazine.

=== Reactivity ===
The reactive groups of symmetrical dimethyl hydrazine are the NH-groups. Both can accept and donate hydrogen bonds, making it soluble in water. The NH-groups can also act as a nucleophile and as a base.

== Biotransformation ==
Symmetrical dimethylhydrazine is first oxidized to azomethane which is then oxidized to azoxymethane. This compound is subsequently hydroxylated to methylazoxymethanol (MAM). These processes occur mostly in the liver, and the hydroxylation step is mediated by cytochrome P450 enzymes.

MAM is chemically unstable and can spontaneously decompose to formaldehyde, water and nitrogen. In this decomposition, the methyldiazonium ion is formed, which can alkylate DNA and increase the risk of mismatched bases.

== Adverse effects ==
Chronic exposure of symmetrical dimethylhydrazine led to adverse effects in multiple organs in animals, but its most prominent effect is carcinogenicity. This has been reported in several animal experiments, including rats and mice.

1,2-dimethylhydrazine is classified as a category 2 carcinogen, meaning that there is a significant probability that it can cause cancer in humans as well.

== Use and exposure risk ==
Symmetrical dimethylhydrazine is mainly used experimentally for its carcinogenic properties, particularly to induce colon cancer in laboratory animals for cancer research. Its isomer, unsymmetrical dimethylhydrazine, is widely used in rocket fuel.

Because symmetrical dimethylhydrazine is not used commercially, it is unlikely to be released into the environment in large volumes. When released into the air, hydrazine compounds are relatively quickly decomposed by reactive compounds in the air. Also, in soil or water hydrazines usually do not persist for longer than a few weeks.

Human exposure is therefore unlikely. Laboratory staff that works with the compound would be most at risk. It might also be possible to come into contact through hazardous waste sites, although unlikely.

== Molecular mechanism of action ==
Symmetrical dimethylhydrazine is an indirect-acting genotoxin, meaning its carcinogenicity depends on the metabolization to methyldiazonium ions. Methyldiazonium is a strong methylating agent due to its electrophilic nature and can methylate nucleotide bases in DNA.

Methylation occurs most frequently at the N7 or O6 sites of guanine, but it can also methylate at the C8 site of guanine and at the N3 site of adenine, as well as at the O4 site of thymine.

The methylated base may mispair during DNA replication. For example, methylated guanine can pair with thymine, instead of cytosine. This is followed by subsequent replication, which leads to further mispairing and could mutate a GC pair to an AT pair. When mutations occur in certain genes a neoplasm can be initiated.

== Toxicology data ==
The International Agency for Research on Cancer (IARC) has classified symmetrical dimethyl hydrazine as part of group 2A of the carcinogenesis classification, meaning it is probably carcinogenic to humans. Although the effects of symmetrical dimethyl hydrazine have not been studied on humans in vivo, there is sufficient evidence acquired from animal studies. Similar patterns of DNA damage in humans and a wide range of animals have been observed in vitro, caused by dimethyl hydrazine.

The ILO-WHO International Chemical Safety Cards (ICSCs) warns that symmetrical dimethyl hydrazine can be absorbed into the body by inhalation, ingestion and possibly through the skin contact. Depending on the route of exposure and on the species tested, the LD50 ranged from tens to several hundred mg/kg.

The primary target appears to be the intestines, where morphological and biochemical changes have been observed in the intestinal epithelium after subcutaneous injection.
