= Azomethane =

Names
- IUPAC name Dimethyldiazene

Identifiers
| CAS Number | 503-28-6 |
| 3D model (JSmol) | Interactive image |
| ChemSpider | 9992 |
| ECHA InfoCard | 100.211.415 |
| EC Number | 685-709-9 |
| PubChem CID | 10421 |
| UNII | MMG2EML2S5 |
| CompTox Dashboard (EPA) | DTXSID70870570 |
- InChI: InChI=1S/C2H6N2/c1-3-4-2/h1-2H3 Key: JCCAVOLDXDEODY-UHFFFAOYSA-N
- SMILES: CN=NC

Properties
| Chemical formula | C_{2}H_{6}N_{2} |
| Molar mass | 58.084 g·mol^{−1} |
| Appearance | colourless to pale yellow gas |
| Melting point | −78 °C (trans) −66 °C (cis) |
| Boiling point | 1.5 °C (trans); 95 °C (cis) |

Hazards
- GHS labelling
| Pictograms | (GHS02: Flammable) |
| Signal word | Danger |
| Hazard statements | H220 |
| Precautionary statements | P203, P210, P222, P280, P377, P381, P403, P410+P403 |
- Except where otherwise noted, data are given for materials in their standard state (at 25 °C [77 °F], 100 kPa). Infobox references

Azomethane is an organic compound with the chemical formula CH_{3}-N=N-CH_{3}. It exhibits cis-trans isomerism. It can be produced by the reaction of 1,2-dimethylhydrazine dihydrochloride with copper(II) chloride in sodium acetate solution. The reaction produces the azomethane complex of copper(I) chloride, which can produce free azomethane by thermal decomposition. It is the source of methyl radical in laboratory.

CH_{3}-N=N-CH_{3} → 2 CH_{3}· + N_{2}
