= Dimethylhydrazine =

Dimethylhydrazine is the name of two compounds with the molecular formula C_{2}H_{8}N_{2}. These are:

- unsymmetrical dimethylhydrazine (1,1-dimethylhydrazine), with both methyl groups bonded to the same nitrogen atom
- symmetrical dimethylhydrazine (1,2-dimethylhydrazine), with one methyl group bonded to each of the two nitrogen atoms

== See also ==
- monomethylhydrazine, a volatile hydrazine chemical
