= Group 8 metallocenylmethylium cation =

Class of metallocene cations

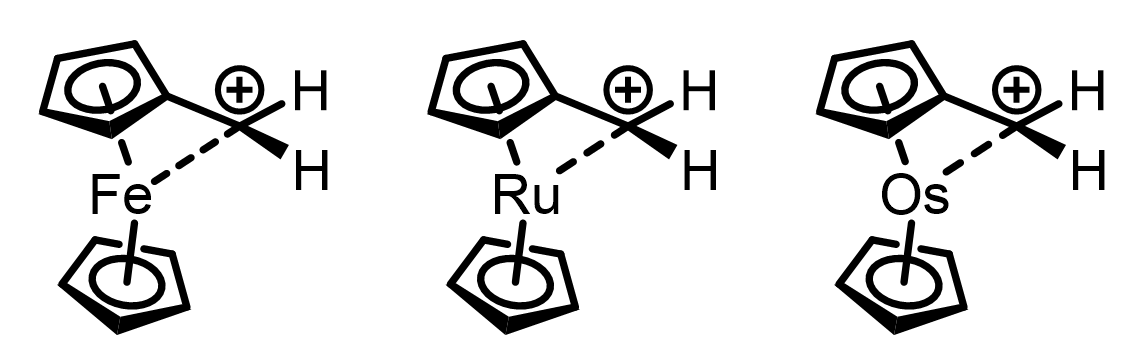
Two-dimensional structures of group 8 metallocenylmethylium cations.

Group 8 Metallocenylmethylium Cations are a class of metallocene cations that feature a bond between the iron, ruthenium or osmium center and a carbenium moiety that extends from the cyclopentadienyl ring of the sandwich complex. They possess a similar electronic structure and bonding to ferrocene and other metallocene compounds. The structure and reactivity of these 18-electron organometallic complexes has been under study since the development of substituted ferrocene derivatives in the 1950s. Investigations of this class of molecule has been motivated the stabilization of the carbenium moiety via the metal center and their high reactivity. These studies were significant enough for one of these group 8 metallocenylmethylium cations, the ruthenocenylmethylium cation, to be the cover molecule of an issue of Organometallics in September, 2007. The issue featured a review of metallocenylmethylium cations, and the founding editor of Organometallics, Dietmar Seyferth, provided an introduction to the review. Upon the development of functionalized ferrocene molecules, studies of the reactivity of these molecules began. Researchers observed higher than expected reactivity at the α-carbon to the cyclopentadienyl ring. In 1956, scientists reported that phenyl-ferrocenyl-methanol formed ethers as effectively as tertiary alcohols. The mild conditions necessary for this reaction led to the hypothesis that an intermediate carbenium was being stabilized via the metallocene.

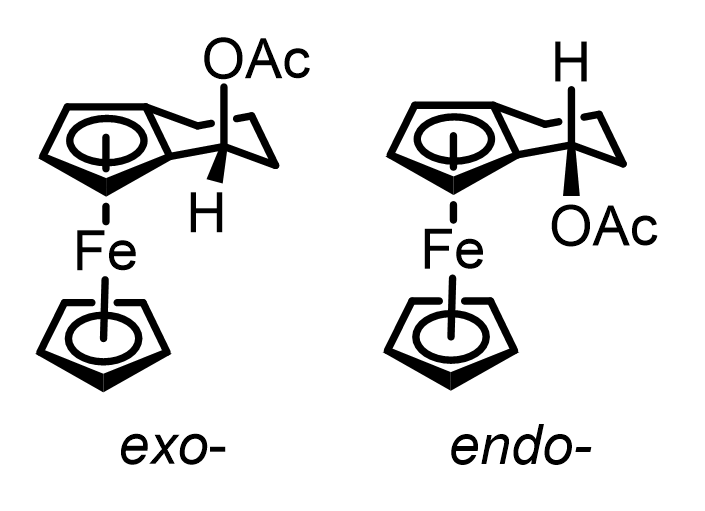
Exo- and endo-α-acetoxy-1,2-tetramethyleneferrocenes.

Building upon the observation of rapid solvolysis at this position, researchers investigated the importance of the orientation of the leaving group relative to the metal. Among exo- and endo-α-acetoxy-1,2-tetramethyleneferrocenes, they observed faster rates of solvolysis of exo-acetoxy groups α to the ferrocene compared to endo-acetoxy groups α to the ferrocene. Compounds with the exo- geometry possess iron atoms trans to the acetoxy groups. This orientation enables the electrons of the iron atom to donate to the antibonding orbital of the α-C-O bond and increases the rate of the ionization. Observation of the enhanced reactivity and geometric constraints of this stabilization led to the hypothesis and subsequent discovery that there was a stabilizing interaction between the metal center and carbocation.

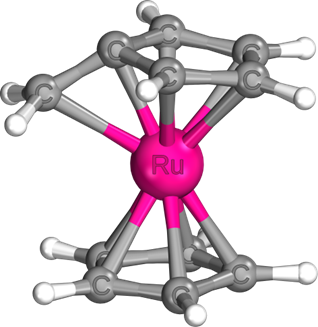
Primary ruthenocenylmethylium cation first reported in 2001 with several weakly coordinating anions

Although these metallocenylmethylium cations had been observed as intermediates and characterized indirectly since the 1950s, the first direct characterization and isolation of a primary metallocenylmethylium via x-ray crystallography did not occur until 1987. The elucidation of the structure of a primary ferrocenylmethylium cation occurred via an electron rich nonamethylferrocenylmethylium cation with a bulky anion in 2000. Prior to the elucidation of this structure, iron-carbenium interactions were not observed in the crystal structures of iron containing substituted carbeniums. The analogous nonamethylmetallocenylmethylium cations were reported in 1987 and 1989 for ruthenium and osmium, respectively. The synthesis, isolation and characterization by x-ray crystallography of the primary ruthenocenylmethylium did not require substitution to the cyclopentadienyl rings and was first reported in 2001.

== Synthesis ==
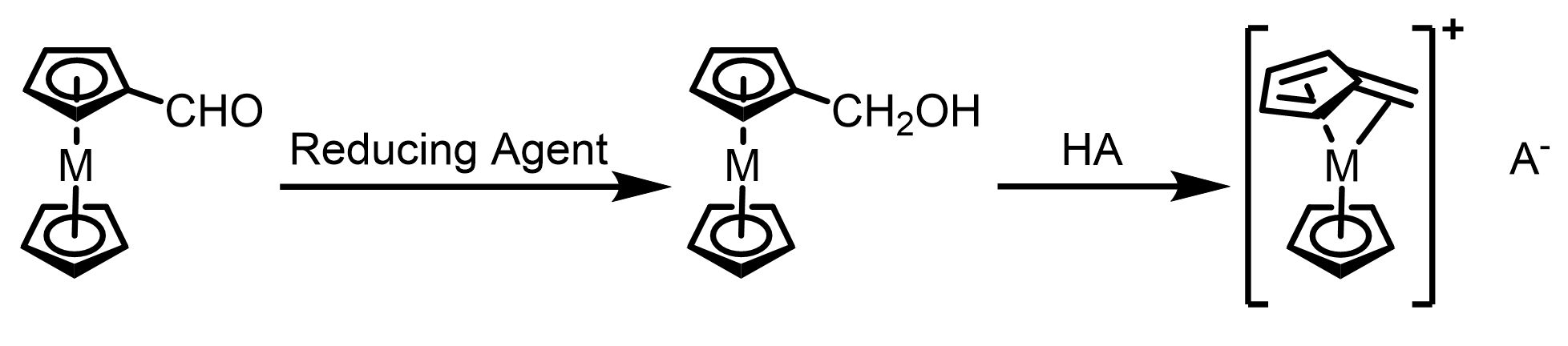
General synthetic scheme for metallocenylmethylium cations starting from a metallocene with a α-aldehyde being reduced to an alcohol. This is then removed with an acid to produce water and the carbenium ion and conjugate base salt.

The synthesis of these compounds is generally achieved via the abstraction of a leaving group from the carbon α to the cyclopentadienyl moiety of the metallocene. Reported strategies often begin with a metallocene with an α-aldehyde and use a reducing agent to reduce the aldehyde to an alcohol. This alcohol can be eliminated by the addition of acids such as fluoroboric acid, hexafluorophosphoric acid, or triflic acid. Additionally, the use of carbenium salts such as triphenylmethyl hexafluorophosphate, results in the elimination of the alcohol. These compounds have been crystallized and isolated as salts with weakly coordinating anions such tetrafluoroborate, hexafluorophosphate, tetraphenylborate, and tetrakis[3,5-bis(trifluoromethyl)phenyl]borate

== Reactivity ==
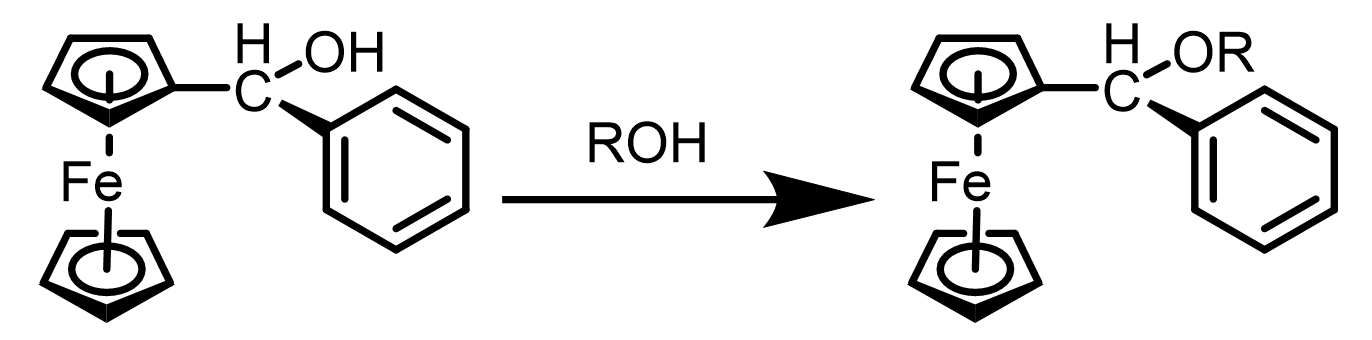
An example of a mild ether synthesis at α-position to metallocene.

The stabilized carbocation that is characteristic of these molecules enables them to undergo C-C, C-N and C-O bond forming reactions under mild conditions. During initial examinations of substituted metallocenes, researchers observed rapid solvolysis of functional groups α to the metallocene. One example of this is the mild synthesis of ethers from hydroxy groups α to the metallocene. Between the iron, ruthenium, and osmium metallocene complexes, researchers observed higher rates of solvolysis of acetate α to the metallocene in 30% acetone/water compared to trityl acetate. The three congeners possessed reactivity towards solvolysis with osmium being the most reactive, followed by ruthenium, and lastly iron was the least reactive. The opposite order of reactivity is observed for electrophilic substitution via acylation and competitive acylation. This trend in reactivity indicates that lesser metal-carbenium interaction leads to more carbocation character at the carbenium fragment.

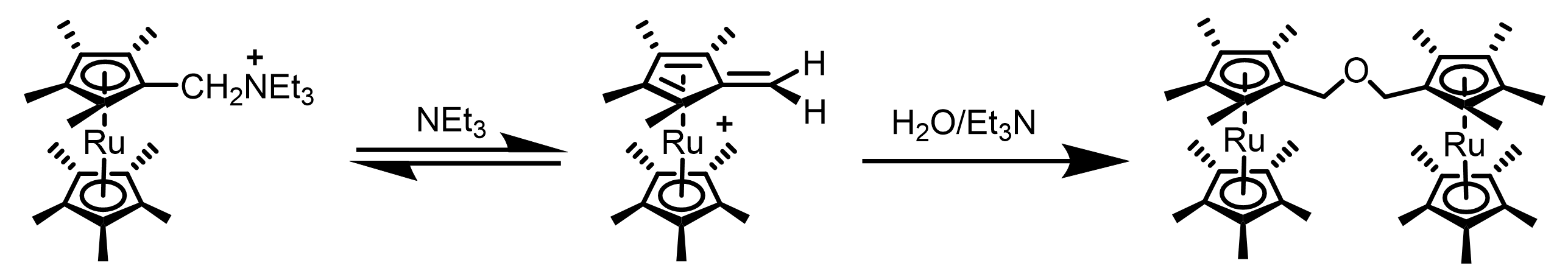
C-N and ether formation from ruthenocenylmethylium cations.

Although the carbenium is stabilized by the metal center, both the octamethyl-ruthenocenylmethylium ions have been observed to react with amines to form C-N bonds, ether linked dimers, or C-C bonds via electrophilic aromatic substitution at the methylium. The reaction of the ruthenocenylmethylium with triethylamine undergoes a reversible reaction between the carbocation and the amine that eventually forms a dimer linked by an oxygen atom. The ether formation results from the formation of hydroxide from advantageous water and the amine base, as the molecules are otherwise less reactive to water. When the octamethyl-ruthenocenylmethylium is treated with N,N'-diethyl-aniline, researchers observe electrophilic aromatic substitution from the para position and the methylium cation rather than C-N bond formation.

== Structure and bonding ==
The structure of metallocenylmethylium ions has been the subject of publications across several decades. Similar to ferrocene, these cations possess two cyclopentadienyl rings forming a sandwich compound with the metal atom. The cyclopentadienyl rings are anionic and possess six-electron π-systems that are aromatic according to Hückel's Rule. The two anionic rings interact with the cationic metal atom to create an 18-electron complex.

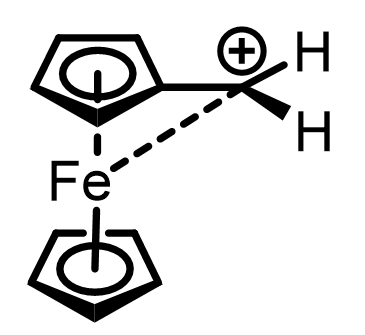
Metal-methylium stabilizing interaction as depicted via a primary ferrocenylmethylium cation.

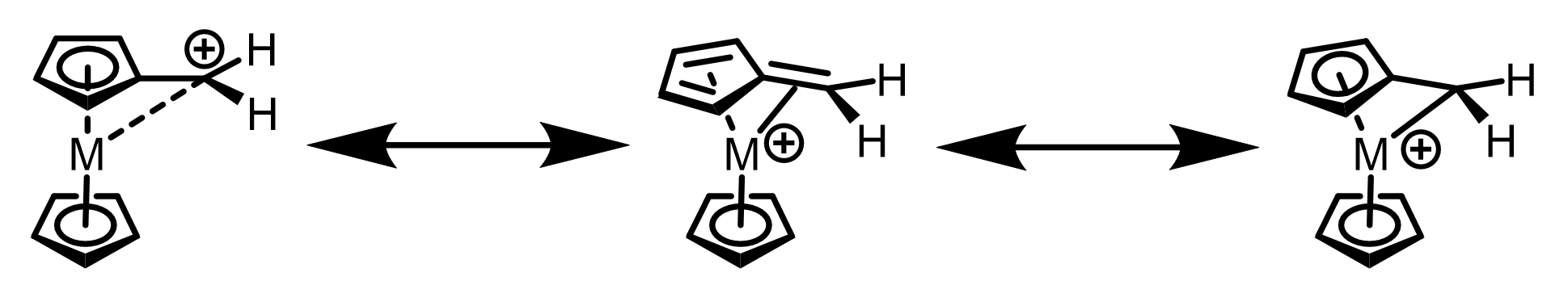
Two-dimensional representation of three resonance structure of metallocenylmethylium cations.

In addition to the sandwich moiety in these molecules, metallocenylmethylium ions possess a carbocation equivalent α to the metallocene. The reactivity of these molecules indicates a stabilizing interaction between the metallocene and methyllium. Researchers debated whether this stabilization resulted from the aromatic system or the metal center. The validity for the fulvene-stabilized molecule was supported by the similar rates of solvolysis between electron rich arenes and ferrocene substituted compounds.

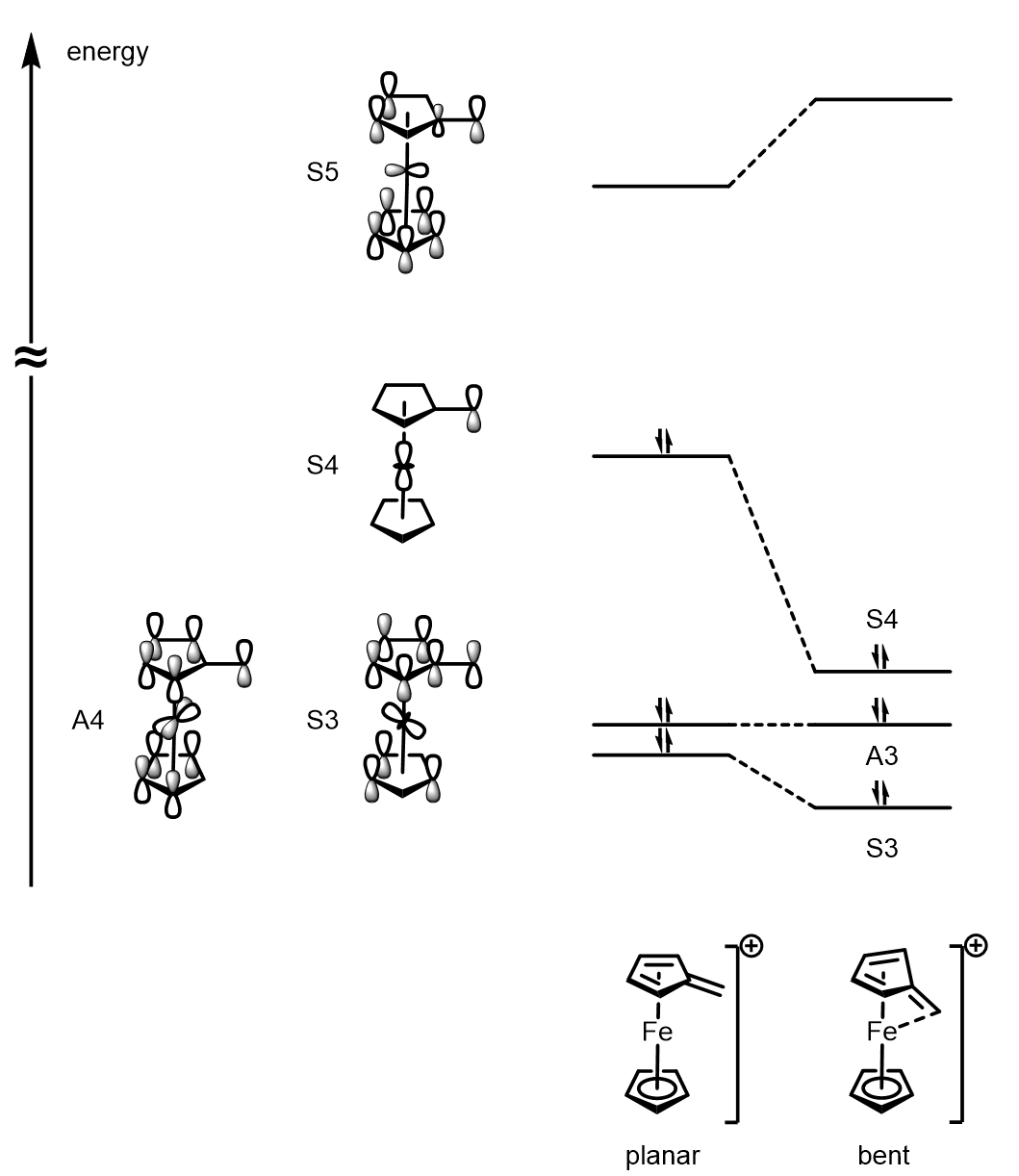
Frontier orbitals of planar and bent α-ferrocenylmethylium ion.

Further support for the stabilizing interaction between the metal center and methylium came from computational studies of α-ferrocenylmethylium that concluded that the metallocenylmethylium took on a bent sandwich conformation featuring a fulvene with broken planarity to maximize overlap between all 11 carbons in the molecule. Mössbauer experiments supported this bonding model as researchers observed quadrupole splitting greater than that of ferrocene, which indicated perturbations to the π-system of the ligand, as changes to the σ-bonding interactions within the ligand do not significantly effect quadrupole splitting in Mössbauer measurements.

Later computation studies of d^{6} and d^{9} α-metallocenylmethylium ions demonstrate that the interaction between the methylium fragment and the metal is strongest when the fulvene substituent is bent towards the metal center. These studies support the empirical measurements and structures produced for these compounds and agrees with well-studied bonding models for metallocene sandwich compounds such as ferrocene. In ferrocene the non-bonding d_{z}^{2} (a_{1g}) orbital is the highest occupied molecular orbital, and this orbital possesses the symmetry to interact with a bent fulvene as seen in metallocenylmethylium cations.

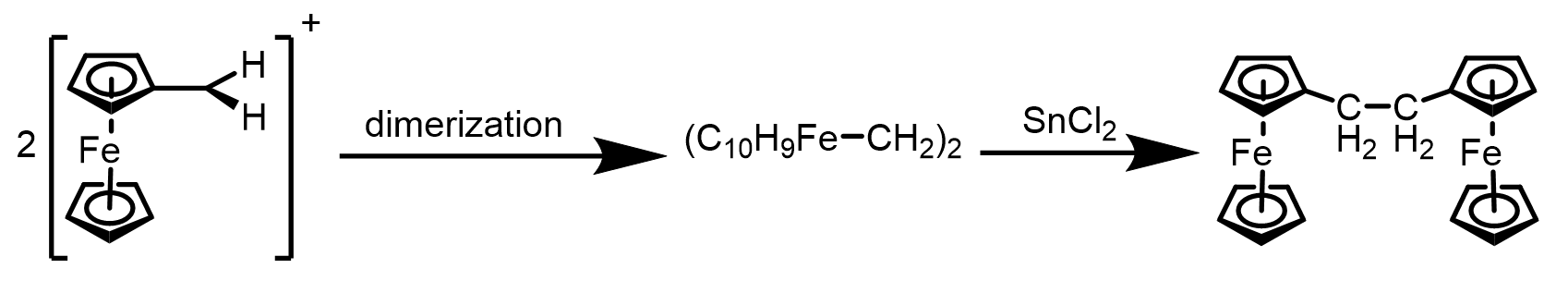
Dimerization of ferrocenylmethylium cations that is suggested to proceed via a radical coupling mechanism.

Although, this distorted geometry of the metallocenylmethylium is thought to provide a lower energy state for the molecule, the planar fulvene bonding model explains the observed dimerization of these cationic species. The smaller HOMO–LUMO gap in the planar fulvene bonding model compared to the distorted sandwich compound would facilitate a triplet state capable of radical dimerization. The hypothesis that these compounds possess triplet character was further supported in 1972 when reaction of ferrocenylmethylium tetrafluoroborate with nitrosobenzene resulted in the generation of a nitroxide radical in a similar manner to a spin-trapping experiment of a radical.

=== Group 8 trends ===
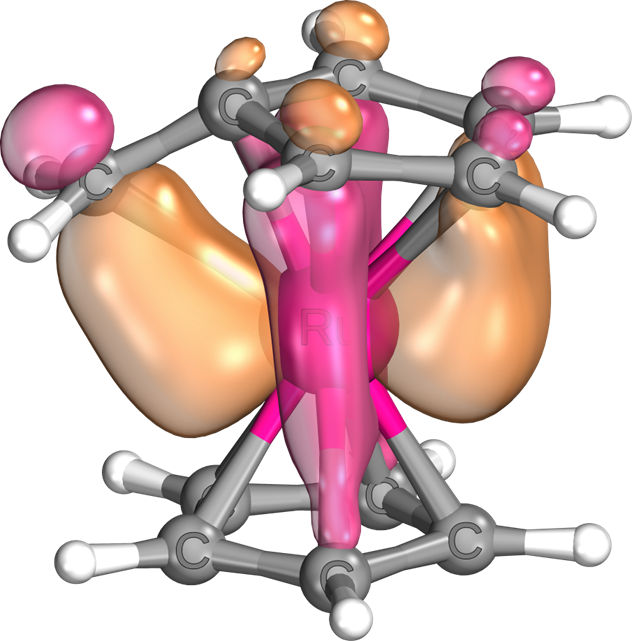
Metal-Methylium bonding orbital of ruthocenylmethylium as visualsized by IBOview after calculation via ORCA at PBE0/def2-SVP level of theory.

Compared to the iron congener, both ruthenium and osmium metallocenylmethylium cations demonstrate greater stability and greater interaction between the methylium and metal centers compared to iron. Regarding the methylium-metal interaction, researchers describe the bend angle from planarity increasing with heavier group eight metals, and a correspondingly shorter metal-methylium bond. When investigating nonamethylmetallocenylmethyium cations, researchers observed metal-carbenium bond distances decreased down the group (d(Fe-Me^{+}) = 2.567 Å, d(Ru-Me^{+}) = 2.270 Å, and d(Os-Me^{+}) = 2.244 Å). The angle at which the carbenium fragment deviates from planarity with the aromatic ring shares the opposite trend (Fe = 22.7°, Ru = 38.2°, and Os = 40.8°). The trends in bonding and reactivity down group 8 indicate that the metal-carbenium interactions increase down group 8.

== Redox activity ==
Ferrocene and its substituted derivatives are known for reversible one-electron processes at low potentials, and substitutions around the cyclopentadienyl rings of ferrocene enable manipulation of the redox potential of the substituted molecule. Similarly, the addition of the carbocation α to these metallocene compounds affects the redox potential of the metallocene fragment. Functionalized ferrecenylmethylium cations have differing redox behavior from the ferrocene parent molecule. Researchers found that ferrocene-substituted bis(3-methylthio-1-azulenyl)methylium ions underwent one electron oxidations at potentials higher than that of ferrocene (+0.15 V). This anodic shift was theorized to result from the interaction of the iron atom and the carbocation that stabilizes the HOMO.
