= Difluorophosphate =

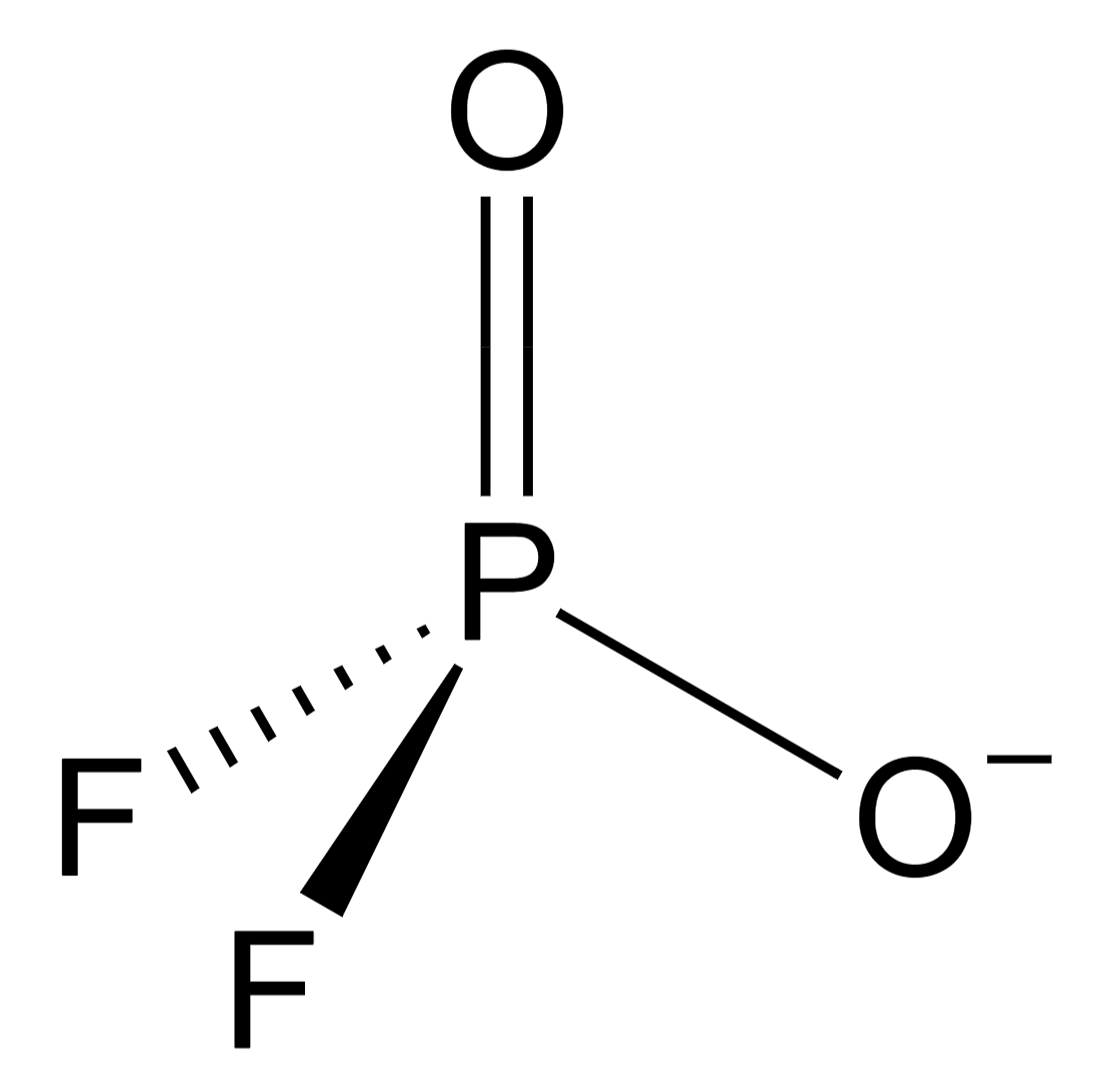

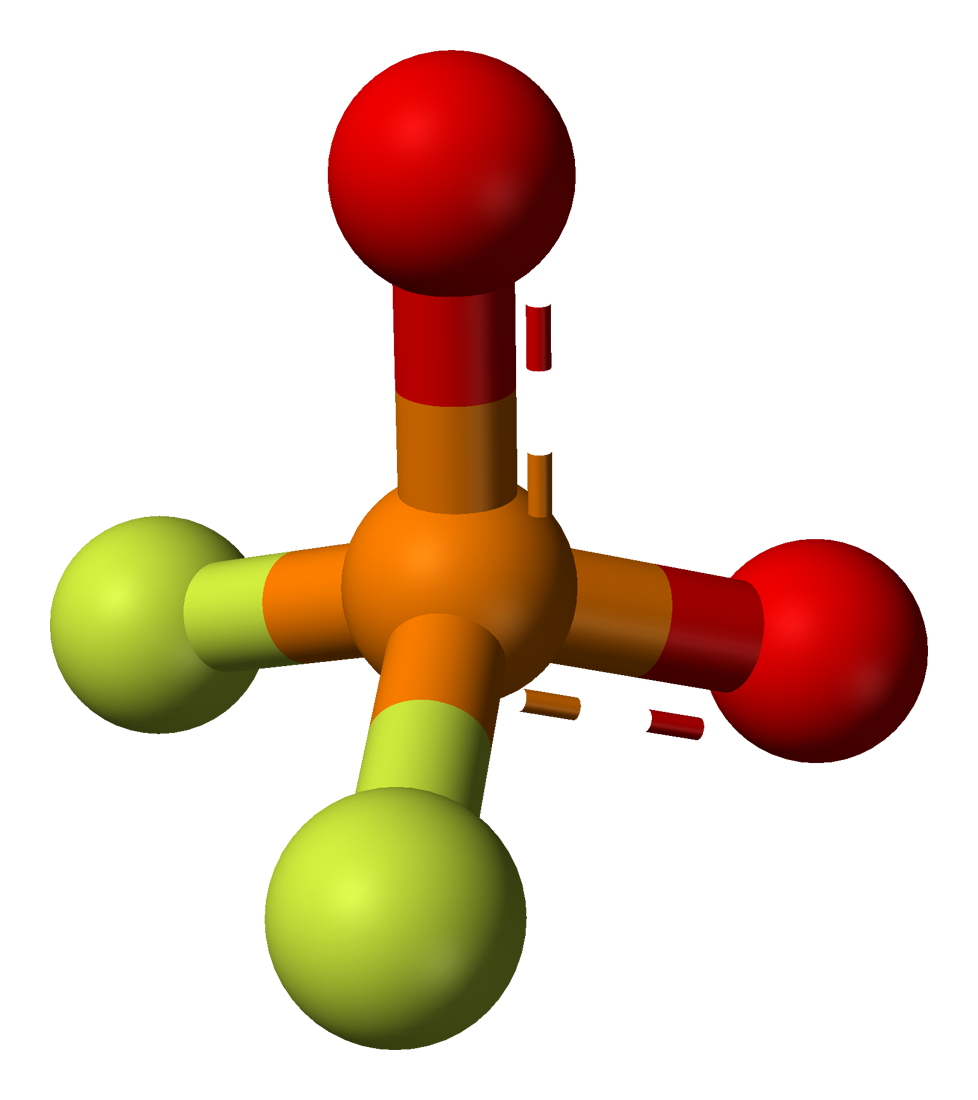
Ball-and-stick model of the difluorophosphate ion
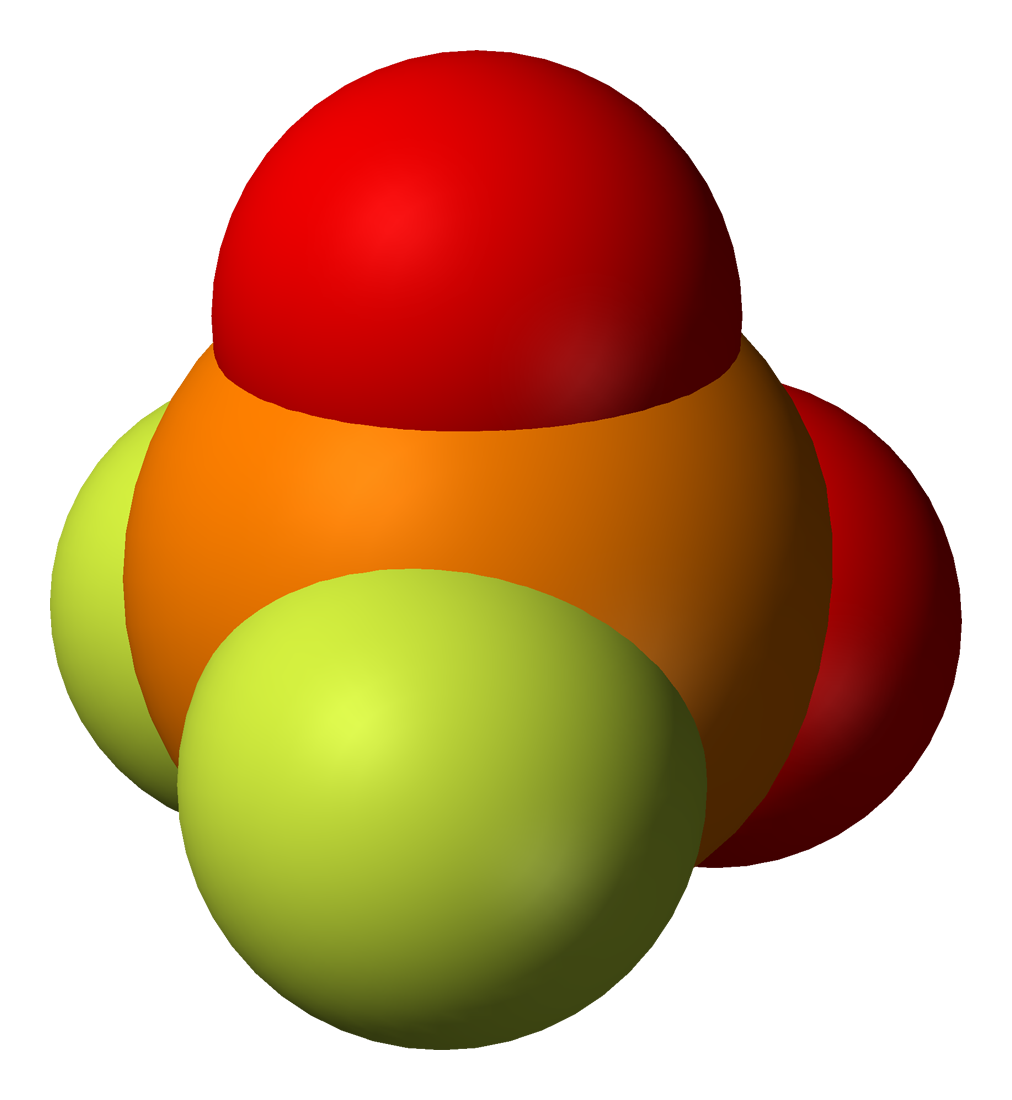
Spacefill model of difluorophosphate

Names
- Systematic IUPAC name Difluorophosphate

Identifiers
CAS Number	7238-93-9
3D model (JSmol)	Interactive image
ChemSpider	4417671
PubChem CID	5250558
CompTox Dashboard (EPA)	DTXSID301045781 DTXSID30413669, DTXSID301045781
- InChI: InChI=1S/F2HO2P/c1-5(2,3)4/h(H,3,4)/p-1 Key: DGTVXEHQMSJRPE-UHFFFAOYSA-M; InChI=1/F2HO2P/c1-5(2,3)4/h(H,3,4)/p-1 Key: DGTVXEHQMSJRPE-REWHXWOFAH
- SMILES: [O-]P(=O)(F)F

Properties
Chemical formula	PO_{2}F^{−}_{2}
Molar mass	100.97 g mol^{−1}

Structure
Coordination geometry	Tetracoordinated at phosphorus atom
Molecular shape	Tetrahedral at phosphorus atom
- Except where otherwise noted, data are given for materials in their standard state (at 25 °C [77 °F], 100 kPa). (what is ?) Infobox references

Difluorophosphate or difluorodioxophosphate or phosphorodifluoridate is an anion with formula PO_{2}F^{−}_{2}. It has a single negative charge and resembles perchlorate (ClO^{−}_{4}) and monofluorosulfonate (SO_{3}F^{−}) in shape and compounds. These ions are isoelectronic, along with tetrafluoroaluminate, phosphate, orthosilicate, and sulfate. It forms a series of compounds. The ion is toxic to mammals as it causes blockage to iodine uptake in the thyroid. However it is degraded in the body over several hours.

Compounds containing difluorophosphate may have it as a simple uninegative ion, it may function as a difluorophosphato ligand where it is covalently bound to one or two metal atoms, or go on to form a networked solid. It may be covalently bound to a non metal or an organic moiety to make an ester or an amide.

== Formation ==
Ammonium difluorophosphate ([NH_{4}]PO_{2}F_{2}) is formed from treating phosphorus pentoxide with ammonium fluoride. This was how the ion was first made by its discoverer, Willy Lange, in 1929.

Alkali metal chlorides can react with dry difluorophosphoric acid to form alkali metal salts.

NaCl + HPO_{2}F_{2} → NaPO_{2}F_{2} + HCl(g)

Fluorination of dichlorophosphates can produce difluorophosphates. Another method is fluorination of phosphates or polyphosphates.

Trimethylsilyl difluorophosphate ((CH_{3})_{3}Si−O−P(=O)F_{2}) reacts with metal chlorides to give difluorophosphates.

The anhydride of difluorophosphoric acid (HPO_{2}F_{2}), phosphoryl difluoride oxide (P_{2}O_{3}F_{4}) reacts with oxides such as UO_{3} to yield difluorophosphates. Phosphoryl difluoride oxide also reacts with alkali metal fluorides to yield difluorophosphates.

== Properties ==
The difluorophosphate ion in ammonium difluorophosphate and potassium difluorophosphate has these interatomic dimensions:

Difluorophosphate salt	P–O length	P–F length	O–P–O angle	F–P–O angle	F–P–F angle
Ammonium difluorophosphate	1.457 Å	1.541 Å	118.7°	109.4°	98.6°
Potassium difluorophosphate	1.470 Å	1.575 Å	122.4°	108.6°	97.1°

Hydrogen bonding from ammonium ion to oxygen atoms causes a change to the difluorophosphate ion in the ammonium salt.

On heating the salts that are not of alkali metals or alkaline earth metals, difluorophosphates decompose firstly by giving off POF_{3} forming a monofluorophosphate (PO_{3}F^{2−}) compound, and then this in turn decomposes to an orthophosphate PO^{3−}_{4} compound.

Difluorophosphate salts are normally soluble and stable in water. However, in acidic or alkaline conditions they can be hydrolyzed to monofluorophosphates and hydrofluoric acid. The caesium and potassium salts are the least soluble.

Irradiating potassium difluorophosphate with gamma rays can make the free radicals •PO_{2}F^{−}, •PO_{3}F^{−} and •PO_{2}F_{2}.

== Compounds ==
Formula	Name	Structure	Infrared spectrum	Melting point	Comments	Reference
LiPO_{2}F_{2}	Lithium difluorophosphate			360 °C		
Be(PO_{2}F_{2})_{2}	Beryllium difluorophosphate			>400 °C d	prepared from BeCl_{2} and acid	
CH_{3}CH_{2}−O−P(=O)F_{2}	Ethyl difluorophosphate					
[NH_{4}]^{+}PO_{2}F^{−}_{2}	Ammonium difluorophosphate	orthorhombic: a = 8.13 Å, b = 6.43 Å, c = 7·86 Å, Z = 4 space group Pnma	P–F stretching 842 and 860 cm^{−1}; P–O stretching 1138 and 1292 cm^{−1}	213 °C		
[NO_{2}]^{+}PO_{2}F^{−}_{2}	Nitronium difluorophosphate		515, 530, 550, 560, 575, 845, 880, 1145, 1300, 2390, 3760 cm^{−1}		nitronium formed from anhydride and N_{2}O_{5}	
[NO]^{+}PO_{2}F^{−}_{2}	Nitrosonium difluorophosphate		500, 840, 880, 1130, 1272, 1315, 2278 cm^{−1}		nitrosonium formed from anhydride and N_{2}O_{3}	
NaPO_{2}F_{2}	Sodium difluorophosphate			210 °C		
Mg(PO_{2}F_{2})_{2}	Magnesium difluorophosphate			200 °C		
[NH_{4}]^{+}Mg^{2+}(PO_{2}F^{−}_{2})_{3}	Ammonium magnesium difluorophosphate	Cmcm a=5.411 b=15.20 c=12.68				
Al(PO_{2}F_{2})_{3}	Aluminium difluorophosphate	polymeric	505, 541, 582, 642, 918, 971, 1200, 1290 cm^{−1} (with 355 cm^{−1} impurity)		formed from Al(CH_{2}CH_{3})_{3} and acid; colourless insoluble powder	
Si(−O−P(=O)F_{2})_{4}	Silicon(IV) difluorophosphate				formed from SiCl_{4} and anhydride	
(CH_{3})_{3}Si−O−P(=O)F_{2}	Trimethylsilyl difluorophosphate				formed from anhydride and [(CH_{3})_{3}Si]_{2}O	
KPO_{2}F_{2}	Potassium difluorophosphate	orthorhombic: a = 8.03 Å, b = 6.205 Å, c = 7.633 Å, Z = 4, V=380.9 Å^{3}, density = 2.44 g/cm^{3}	510, 525, 570, 835, 880, 1145, 1320, 1340 cm^{−1}	263 °C	colourless elongated prisms	
(K^{+})_{4}(PO_{2}F^{−}_{2})_{2}(S_{2}O^{2−}_{7})	Tetrapotassium difluorophosphate pyrosulfate	C2/c: a = 13.00 Å, b = 7.543 Å, c = 19.01 Å, β = 130.07°, Z = 4				
Ca(PO_{2}F_{2})_{2}·CH_{3}COOCH_{2}CH_{3}	Calcium difluorophosphate - ethyl acetate 1:1 solvate					
Ca(PO_{2}F_{2})_{2}	Calcium difluorophosphate			>345 °C d		
[VO_{2}]^{+}PO_{2}F^{−}_{2}	Pervanadyl difluorophosphate					
CrO_{2}(PO_{2}F_{2})_{2}	Chromyl difluorophosphate				formed from anhydride; red-brown	
Cr(PO_{2}F_{2})_{3}	Chromium(III) difluorophosphate		320, 385, 490, 575, 905, 955, 1165, 1255 cm^{−1}		formed from excess anhydride, green	
Mn(CO)_{5}PO_{2}F_{2}				184 °C		
HMn(PO_{2}F_{2})_{3}					dissolve manganese in acid; white	
[NH^{+}_{4}](Mn^{2+})_{3}(PO_{2}F^{−}_{2})(PO_{3}F^{2−})_{2}(F^{−})_{2}						
Fe(PO_{2}F_{2})_{2}	Iron(II) difluorophosphate		463, 496, 668 (weak), 869 (double), 1139, 1290 cm^{−1}	180 °C d	colour blue green, hygroscopic, melts 250 °C, above 300 °C starts decomposing to Fe_{3}(PO_{4})_{2}	
Fe(PO_{2}F_{2})_{3}	Iron(III) difluorophosphate		262, 493, 528, 570, 914, 965, 1173, 1242 cm^{−1}	>400 °C	decomposes at 230 °C yielding FeF_{3}; dissolve iron in acid in presence of oxygen	
K^{+}(Fe^{2+})_{3}(PO_{2}F^{−}_{2})(PO_{3}F^{2−})_{2}(F^{−})_{2}						
Co(PO_{2}F_{2})_{2}	Cobalt(II) difluorophosphate			173 °C	prepared from CoCl_{2} and acid; pink or blue; blue formed by heating pink to 140 °C	
HCo(PO_{2}F_{2})_{3}					dissolve cobalt in acid; red-purple	
Co(PO_{2}F_{2})_{2}·2CH_{3}CN	Cobalt(II) difluorophosphate - methyl cyanide solvate 1:2	orthorhombic: a = 9.227 Å, b = 13.871 Å, c = 9.471 Å, V = 1212 Å^{3}, Z = 4, density = 1.88 g/cm^{3}			treat HCo(PO_{2}F_{2})_{3} with CH_{3}CN for a few weeks; red crystals	
[NH^{+}_{4}](Co^{2+})_{3}(PO_{2}F^{−}_{2})(PO_{3}F^{2−})_{2}(F^{−})_{2}						
Ni(PO_{2}F_{2})_{2}	Nickel(II) difluorophosphate			255 °C d	slowly prepared from NiCl_{2} and acid; yellow	
HNi(PO_{2}F_{2})_{3}					dissolve nickel in acid; yellow	
Cu(PO_{2}F_{2})_{2}	Copper(II) difluorophosphate	orthorhombic Fddd: a = 10.134 Å, b = 24.49 Å, c = 34.06 Å, Z = 48, V = 8454.3 Å^{3}, density = 2.50 g/cm^{3}		265 °C d	pale blue needles	
CuI(xantphos)_{2}(μ-PO_{2}F_{2})		polymeric; monoclinic: a = 12.435 Å, b = 10.887 Å, c = 25.682 Å, β = 100.220°, V = 3421 Å^{3}			colourless	
Zn(PO_{2}F_{2})_{2}	Zinc(II) difluorophosphate			c. 25 °C?	glassy	
H_{2}[Zn(PO_{2}F_{2})_{4}]	Tetra(difluorophosphato)zincic(II) acid					
Ga(PO_{2}F_{2})_{3}	Gallium(III) difluorophosphate					
[(CH_{3})_{2}GaPO_{2}F_{2}]_{2}	Dimethylgallium(III) difluorophosphate	dimeric	380, 492, 520, 551, 616, 709, 750, 899, 949, 1171, 1218, 1262, 1295, 1404, 2922, 2982 cm^{−1}			
RbPO_{2}F_{2}	Rubidium difluorophosphate	orthorhombic: a = 8.15 Å, b = 6.45 Å, c = 7.79 Å, Z = 4, V = 409.5 Å^{3} density = 3.02 g/cm^{3}	P–F stretching 827 and 946 cm^{−1}; P–O stretching 1145 and 1320 cm^{−1}	160 °C	white	
Sr(PO_{2}F_{2})_{2}	Strontium difluorophosphate			250 °C d	prepared from SrCl_{2} and acid	
[NH_{4}]Sr(PO_{2}F_{2})_{3}	Ammonium strontium difluorophosphate	Triclinic P1̅ a=7.370 b=11.054 c=13.645 α=88.861 β=87.435° γ=89.323°				
AgPO_{2}F_{2}	Silver(I) difluorophosphate					
Ag_{9}(PO_{2}F_{2})_{14}						
Ag(1-methyl-2-alkylthiomethyl-1H-benzimidazole)PO_{2}F_{2}						
Ag(2,6-bis-[(2-methylthiophenyl)-2-azaethenyl]pyridine)PO_{2}F_{2}		Triclinic P1: a = 7.687 Å, b = 10.740 Å, c = 13.568 Å, α = 99.52°, β = 96.83°, γ = 99.83°, Z = 2, V = 1076 Å^{3}, density = 1.81 g/cm^{3}				
Ag(4,4′-dicyanodiphenylacetylene)PO_{2}F_{2}						
Cd(PO_{2}F_{2})_{2}	Cadmium(II) difluorophosphate			245 °C d		
In(PO_{2}F_{2})_{3}	Indium(III) difluorophosphate		269, 492, 528, 567, 910, 962, 1179, 1269 cm^{−1}		white, decomposes at 260 °C yielding InF_{3}	
[(CH_{3})_{2}InPO_{2}F_{2}]_{2}	Dimethylindium(III) difluorophosphate	dimeric	373, 490, 500, 535, 559, 735, 878, 925, 1128, 1179, 1275, 1435, 2928, 3000 cm^{−1}			
SnCl_{2}(PO_{2}F_{2})_{2}	Tin(IV) dichloride difluorophosphate					
(CH_{3})_{2}Sn(PO_{2}F_{2})_{2}	Dimethyltin(IV) difluorophosphate			204 °C d	prepared from (CH_{3})_{2}SnCl_{2} and acid; yellow	
(CH_{3}CH_{2})_{2}Sn(PO_{2}F_{2})_{2}	Diethyltin(IV) difluorophosphate			262 °C d	prepared from (CH_{3}CH_{2})_{2}SnCl_{2} and acid; yellow	
(CH_{3}CH_{2}CH_{2})_{2}Sn(PO_{2}F_{2})_{2}	Dipropyltin(IV) difluorophosphate			245 °C d	prepared from (CH_{3}CH_{2}CH_{2})_{2}SnCl_{2} and acid; yellow	
(CH_{3}(CH_{2})_{3})_{2}Sn(PO_{2}F_{2})_{2}	Dibutyltin(IV) difluorophosphate			235 °C d	prepared from (CH_{3}(CH_{2})_{7})_{2}SnCl_{2} and acid; yellow	
(CH_{3}(CH_{2})_{7})_{2}Sn(PO_{2}F_{2})_{2}	Dioctyltin(IV) difluorophosphate			114 °C	prepared from (CH_{3}(CH_{2})_{7})_{2}SnCl_{2} and acid; yellow	
SbCl_{4}PO_{2}F_{2}	Antimony(V) tetrachloride difluorophosphate					
SbF_{4}PO_{2}F_{2}	Antimony(V) tetrafluoride difluorophosphate					
(2,2-dipyradyl)2Re(CO)_{2}PO_{2}F_{2}						
Au[bis(triphenylphosphine sulfide-S)]PO_{2}F_{2}						
IO_{2}PO_{2}F_{2}			Raman: 130, 163, 191, 219, 295, 323, 329, 378, 637, 713, 737, 781, 799, 839, 918, 1163 cm^{−1}		yellowish colour, produced from IO_{3}, decomposed by water	
IO_{3}PO_{2}F_{2}			Raman: 217, 247, 269, 305, 343, 367, 395, 473, 569, 643, 671, 717, 797, 891, 1123 cm^{−1}		yellowish colour, produced from H_{5}IO_{6}, decomposed by water	
FXePO_{2}F_{2}	Xenon(II) fluoride difluorophosphate					
Xe(PO_{2}F_{2})_{2}	Xenon(II) difluorophosphate					
CsPO_{2}F_{2}	Caesium difluorophosphate	orthorhombic: a = 8.437 Å, b = 6.796 Å, c = 8.06 Å, Z = 4, V = 462.1 Å^{3}, density = 3.36 g/cm^{3}		286 °C		
(Cs^{+})_{2}(Fe^{3+})_{2}(PO_{2}F^{−}_{2})(PO_{3}F^{2−})_{2}(F^{−})_{3}						
Ba(PO_{2}F_{2})_{2}	Barium difluorophosphate	orthorhombic I4̅2d a =10.4935 b =10.4935 c =26.030		>400 °C		
[NH_{4}]_{2}Ba(PO_{2}F_{2})_{4}	Diammonium barium difluorophosphate	P2/n a=14.285 b=5.472 c=19.474 β=97.607°				
KBaSr(PO_{2}F_{2})(PO_{3}F)_{2}		P2_{1}/c a=7.0638 b=7.4306 =21.3633 β=93.386°, V=1119.37 Å^{3} Z=4			birefringence 0.042@550 nm	
Re(CO)_{5}PO_{2}F_{2}						
Hg(PO_{2}F_{2})_{2}	Mercury(II) difluorophosphate					
Hg_{2}(PO_{2}F_{2})_{2}	Mercury(I) difluorophosphate or di(difluorophosphato)dimercurane	Raman: 220 cm^{−1}		produced from anhydride		
TlPO_{2}F_{2}	Thallium(I) difluorophosphate				produced from anhydride, or acid on TlCl	
[(CH_{3})_{2}TlPO_{2}F_{2}]_{2}	Dimethylthallium(III) difluorophosphate	dimeric	360, 374, 500, 505, 520, 559, 850, 880, 1120, 1140, 1195, 1250, 1285, 2932, 3020 cm^{−1}			
Pb(PO_{2}F_{2})_{2}	Lead(II) difluorophosphate			189 °C d		
UO_{2}(PO_{2}F_{2})_{2}	Uranyl difluorophosphate		260, 498, 854, 924, 980, 1124 cm^{−1}		IR spectrum due to UO^{2+}_{2}	
[(CH_{3}CH_{2})_{4}N]^{+}PO_{2}F^{−}_{2}	Tetraethylammonium difluorophosphate					
	1-ethyl-3-methylimidazolium difluorophosphate				ionic liquid	
	1-butyl-3-methylimidazolium difluorophosphate				ionic liquid	
	1-butyl-1-methylpyrrolidinium difluorophosphate				ionic liquid	
	1-butyl-1-methylpiperidinium difluorophosphate				ionic liquid	
	di(3,3′,4,4′-tetramethyl-2,2′,5,5′-tetraselenafulvalenium)difluorophosphate				Transitions to a metallic state below 137 K (−136 °C)	
	1,4-diphenyl-3,5-enanilo-4,5-dihydro-1,2,4-triazole (nitron)	monoclinic P2_{1}/n: a = 7.3811 Å, b = 14.9963 Å, c = 16.922 Å, β = 102.138°, V = 1361.2 Å^{3}, Z = 4			insoluble; yellow-brown	
Strychnine PO_{2}F_{2}						
Cocaine PO_{2}F_{2}						
Brucine PO_{2}F_{2}						
Morphine PO_{2}F_{2}						
[N(CH_{3})_{4}]^{+}PO_{2}F^{−}_{2}	Tetramethylammonium difluorophosphate					
H[B(PO_{2}F_{2})_{4}]	Tetra(difluorophosphato)boric acid		469, 502, 552, 647, 836, 940, 994, 1093, 1348, 1567 cm^{−1}		formed from BBr_{3} and acid; liquid	
Li[B(PO_{2}F_{2})_{4}]	Lithium tetra(difluorophosphato)borate	monoclinic P2_{1}/c: a=7.9074 Å, b = 14.00602 Å, c = 13.7851 Å, β = 121.913°, Z = 4	479, 502, 568, 833, 945, 1002, 1080, 1334 cm^{−1}		formed from HB(PO_{2}F_{2})_{4} and butyllithium; colourless	
[HS(CH_{3})_{2}]^{+}[B(PO_{2}F_{2})_{4}]^{−}	Dimethylsulfonium tetra(difluorophosphato)borate		472, 511, 555, 648, 832, 933, 993, 1082, 1337, 1436, 2851, 2921, 3042 cm^{−1}		formed from BH_{3}·S(CH_{3})_{2} and acid; ionic liquid	
[Li((CH_{3}CH_{2})_{2}O)^{+}]_{3}[Al(PO_{2}F_{2})_{6}]^{−}	(Diethyl ether)lithium hexa(difluorophosphato)aluminate	trigonal R3̅: a = 17.4058 Å, b = 17.4058 Å, c = 21.4947 Å, γ = 120°, Z = 6	417, 503, 536, 624, 723, 891, 922, 964, 1174, 1204, 1283 cm^{−1}		formed from butyllithium and triethylaluminium and the acid; white	
K_{2}CrO_{2}(PO_{2}F_{2})_{4}			305, 370, 485, 550, 870, 920, 1050, 1130, 1250 cm^{−1}	145 °C d	formed from anhydride and K_{2}CrO_{4}; brown	
Na_{2}MoO_{2}(PO_{2}F_{2})_{4}		amorphous	280, 490, 620, 880, 915, 950, 1020, 1070, 1140, 1280 cm^{−1}	125 °C d	formed from anhydride and K_{2}MoO_{4}; white	
Na_{2}WO_{2}(PO_{2}F_{2})_{4}		amorphous	280, 474, 620, 930, 1030, 1130, 1230 cm^{−1}	109 °C d	formed from anhydride and K_{2}WO_{4}; white	

== Related substances ==
=== Difluorophosphoric acid ===
Difluorophosphoric acid (HPO_{2}F_{2}) is one of the fluorophosphoric acids. It is produced when phosphoryl fluoride reacts with water:

POF_{3} + H_{2}O → HPO_{2}F_{2} + HF

This in turn is hydrolysed more to give monofluorophosphoric acid (H_{2}PO_{3}F), and a trace of hexafluorophosphoric acid (HPF_{6}). HPO_{2}F_{2} also is produced when HF reacts with phosphorus pentoxide. Yet another method involves making difluorophosphoric acid as a side product of calcium fluoride being heated with damp phosphorus pentoxide. A method to make pure difluorophosphoric acid involves heating phosphoryl fluoride with monofluorophosphoric acid and separating the product by distillation:

POF_{3} + H_{2}PO_{3}F → 2 HPO_{2}F_{2}

Difluorophosphoric acid can also be produced by fluorinating phosphorus oxychlorides. P_{2}O_{3}Cl_{4} and POCl_{3} react with hydrogen fluoride solution to yield HPO_{2}Cl_{2} and then HPO_{2}F_{2}. Yet another way is to treat orthophosphate (PO^{3−}_{4}) with fluorosulfuric acid (HSO_{3}F).

Difluorophosphoric acid is a colorless liquid. It melts at −96.5 °C (−141.7 °F) and boils at 115.9 °C (240.6 °F). Its density at 25 °C is 1.583 g/cm^{3}.

=== Phosphoryl difluoride oxide ===
Difluorophosphoric acid anhydride also known as phosphoryl difluoride oxide or diphosphoryl tetrafluoride (F_{2}(O=)P−O−P(=O)F_{2} or P_{2}O_{3}F_{4}) is an anhydride of difluorophosphoric acid. It crystallises in the orthorhombic system, with space group Pcca and Z = 4. P_{2}O_{3}F_{4} can be made by refluxing difluorophosphoric acid with phosphorus pentoxide. P_{2}O_{3}F_{4} boils at 71 °C.

=== Substitution ===
In addition to the isoelectronic series, ions related by substituting fluorine or oxygen by other elements include monofluorophosphate, difluorothiophosphate, dichlorothiophosphate, dichlorophosphate, chlorofluorothiophosphate, chlorofluorophosphate, dibromophosphate, and bromofluorophosphate.

=== Adducts ===
Difluorophosphate can form adducts with PF_{5} and AsF_{5}. In these the oxygen atoms form a donor-acceptor link between the P and As (or P) atoms, linking the difluorides to the pentafluorides. Example salts include KPO_{2}F_{2}·2AsF_{5}, KPO_{2}F_{2}·AsF_{5}, KPO_{2}F_{2}·2PF_{5} and KPO_{2}F_{2}·PF_{5}.

Amines can react with phosphoryl fluoride to make substances with a formula RR′N−P(=O)F_{2}. The amines shown to do this include ethylamine, isopropylamine, n-butylamine, t-butylamine, dimethylamine, and diethylamine. The monoamines can further react to yield an alkyliminophosphoric fluoride (R−N=P(=O)F).
