= Monofluorophosphate =

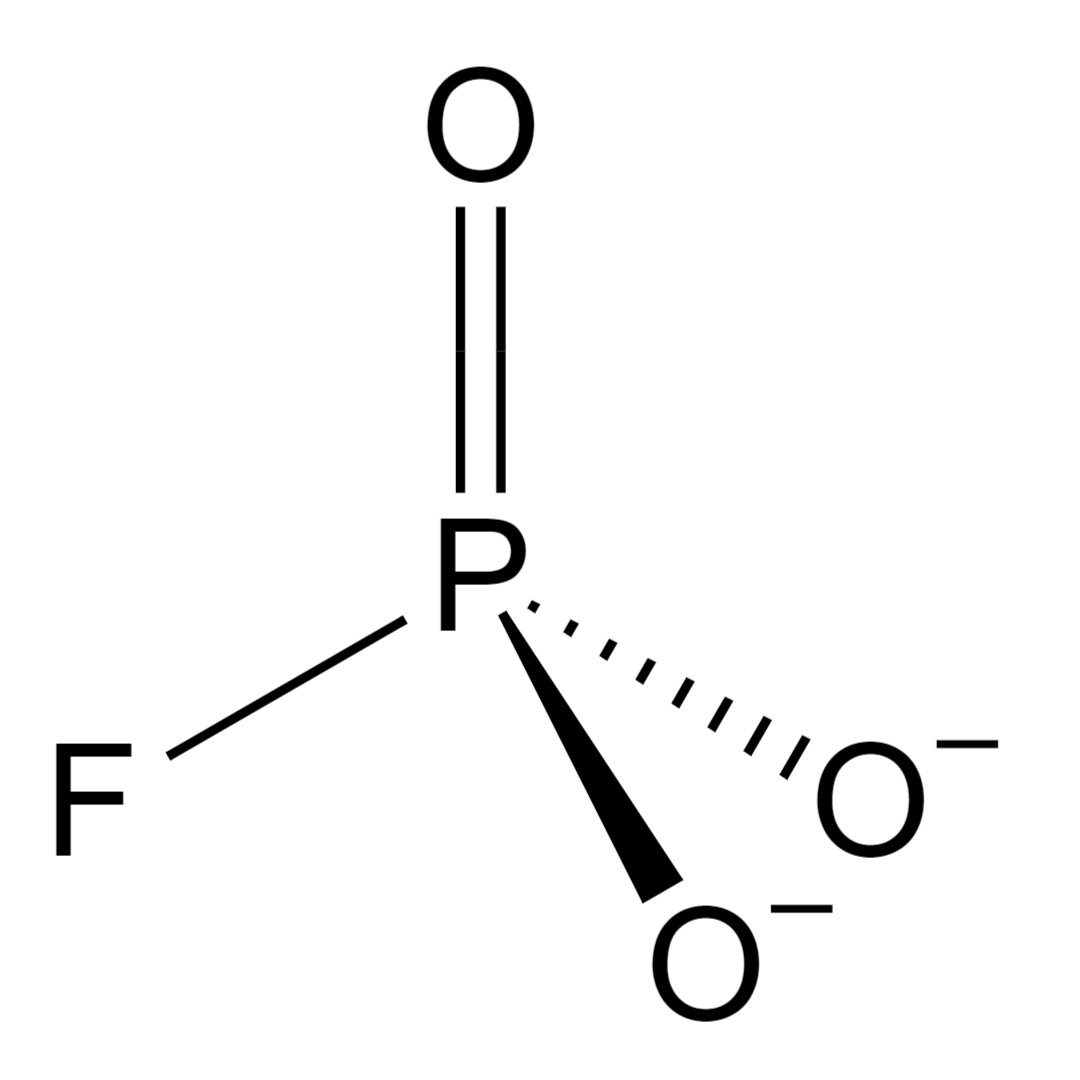

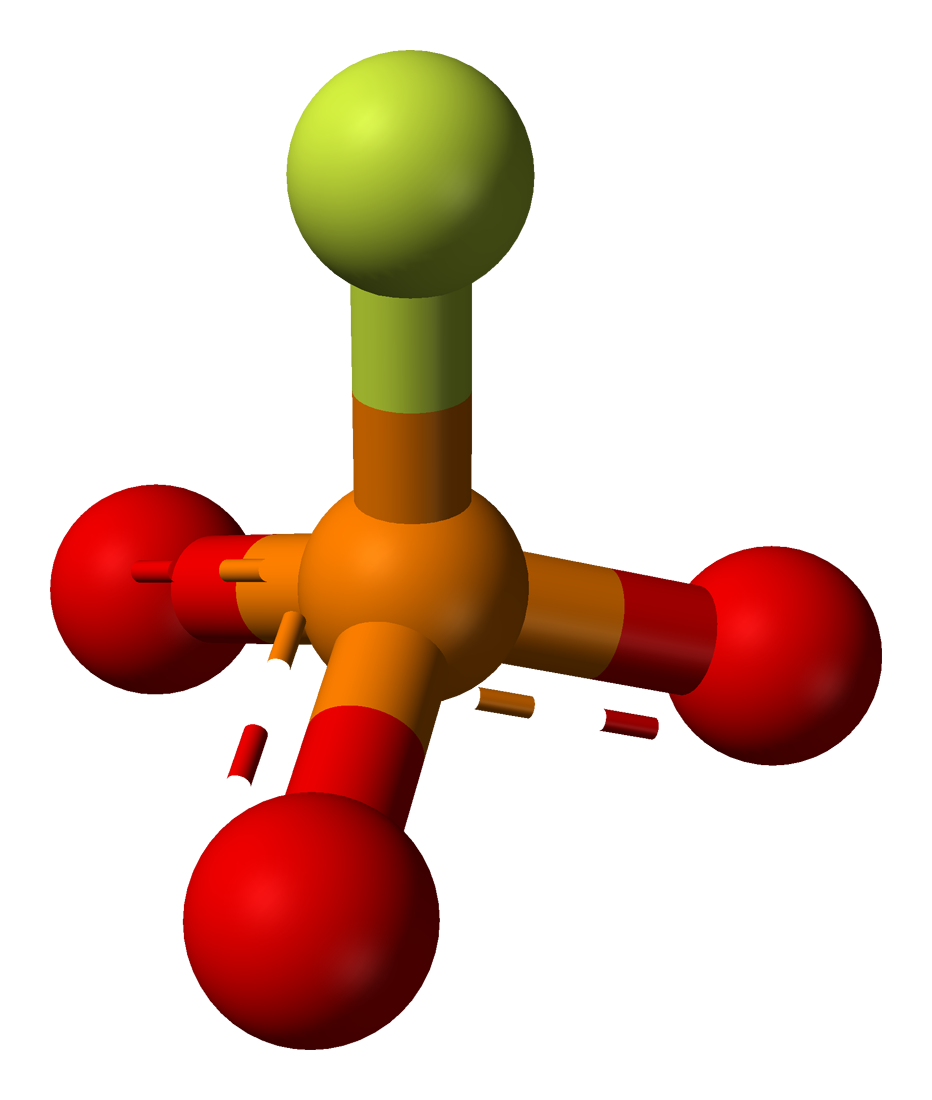
- yellow (lightest): fluorine; orange (darker): phosphorus; red (darkest): oxygen

Names
- IUPAC name Fluoro-dioxido-oxo-λ^{5}-phosphane
- Other names: Fluorophosphate; Fluorophosphonate; Monofluorophosphate; Phosphorofluoridate

Identifiers
CAS Number	15181-43-8
3D model (JSmol)	Interactive image
ChemSpider	58737
PubChem CID	65241
UNII	4964UZ79MI
CompTox Dashboard (EPA)	DTXSID90164882
- InChI: InChI=1S/FH2O3P/c1-5(2,3)4/h(H2,2,3,4)/p-2 Key: DWYMPOCYEZONEA-UHFFFAOYSA-L
- SMILES: [O-]P(=O)([O-])F

Properties
Chemical formula	PO_{3}F^{2−}
Molar mass	97.971 g/mol
- Except where otherwise noted, data are given for materials in their standard state (at 25 °C [77 °F], 100 kPa). Infobox references

Monofluorophosphate (fluorophosphate) is an anion with the formula PO_{3}F^{2−}, which is a phosphate group with one oxygen atom substituted with a fluoride atom. The charge of the ion is −2. The ion resembles sulfate in size, shape and charge, and can thus form compounds with the same structure as sulfates. These include Tutton's salts and langbeinites. The most well-known compound containing monofluorophosphate is sodium monofluorophosphate, commonly used in toothpaste, and mouthwash.

Related ions include difluorophosphate (PO_{2}F^{−}_{2}) and hexafluorophosphate ([PF_{6}]^{−}). The related neutral molecule is monofluorophosphoric acid H_{2}PO_{3}F.

Organic derivatives can be highly toxic and include diisopropyl fluorophosphate. Some of the Novichok agents are monofluorophosphate esters. Names are given to these by naming the groups attached as esters and then adding "fluorophosphonate" to the end of the name. Two organic groups can be attached. Other related nerve gas substances may not be esters, and instead have carbon-phosphorus or nitrogen-phosphorus bonds. The organic fluorophosphonates react with serine esterases and serine proteases irreversibly. This prevents these enzymes from functioning. Such an important enzyme is acetylcholinesterase as found in most animals. Some of the organic esters are detoxified in mammals by an enzyme in the blood and liver called paraoxonase PON1.

Willy Lange from Berlin discovered sodium monofluorophosphate in 1929. He fruitlessly tried to make monofluorophosphoric acid. However, he did discover the highly toxic organic esters. Following this discovery various nerve gases like sarin were developed.

Fluorophosphate glasses are low melting point kinds of glass which are mixtures of fluoride and phosphate metal compounds. For example, the composition 10% SnO, 40% SnF_{2}, 50% P_{2}O_{5} forms a glass melting about 139 °C. PbO and PbF_{2} can lower the melting temperature, and increase water resistance. These glasses can also be coloured by various other elements, and organic dyes.

Some mixed anion compounds are known with other anions like fluoride, chloride, difluorophosphate or tetrafluoroborate.

== Production ==
Hydrolysis of difluorophosphate with an alkali produces monofluorophosphate.

PO_{2}F^{−}_{2} + 2 MOH → M_{2}PO_{3}F + H_{2}O + F^{−}

Industrial production is by reaction of a fluoride with a metaphosphate.

MF + MPO_{3} → M_{2}PO_{3}F

Disodium hydrogen phosphate or tetrasodium pyrophosphate can react with hydrogen fluoride to form the sodium salt.

Na_{2}HPO_{4} or Na_{4}P_{2}O_{7}

Phosphoric acid reacts with metal fluorides dissolved in molten urea to yield monofluorophosphates.

== Properties ==
Monofluorophosphates are stable at room temperature, but will decompose when heated. For example, at 450 K (177 °C), silver monofluorophosphate gives off phosphoryl fluoride (POF_{3}) as a gas leaving behind silver phosphate (Ag_{3}PO_{4}) and silver pyrophosphate (Ag_{4}P_{2}O_{7}).

In inorganic compounds the monofluorophosphate ion has an average P–O bond length of 1.51 Å. The P–F bond is longer, on average 1.58 Å. The O P F angle is 104.8°, smaller than the tetrahedral 109.47°. To compensate the O P O bond angle is 113.7° on average.

Most commonly the monofluorophosphtae ion takes on point group 1, but a significant number have point group m. Only two are known with 3m and one with 3.

When compared to sulfates, some are isotypical with the monofluorophosphates. Yet others have sulfates that take on a different form. But most know monofluorophosphates have no known equivalent sulfate.

== Compounds ==
Name	Formula	Formula weight	space group	Crystal form	Density	Comment	ref	CAS
fluorophosphoric acid	H_{2}PO_{3}F	99.986						13537-32-1
	BePO_{3}F-I		Pc	a=4.9331 b=6.6283 c=4.7083 β=90.2007 Z=2		band gap 8.03 eV SHG 1.72×KDP		
	BePO_{3}F-II		P6_{3}	a=4.9651 c=9.3236 Z=2				
	BePO_{3}F-III		Cc	a=4.9542 b=8.5812 c=10.0532 β=98.0674 Z=4				
	BePO_{3}F-IV		Cc	a=8.5892 b=4.9532 c=10.1526 β=92.4967 Z=4				
	BePO_{3}F-V		Cm	a=9.2837 b=5.1602 c=7.1809 β=143.9321 Z=2				
	BePO_{3}F-VI		P6_{3}mc	a=5.1519 c=8.8598 Z=2				
ammonium monofluorophosphate	(NH_{4})_{2}PO_{3}F	134.05	orthorhombic	a = 6.29 Å, b = 8.31 Å, c = 12.70 Å, β = 99.6°, Z = 4	1.633			
ammonium monofluorophosphate hydrate	(NH_{4})_{2}PO_{3}F·H_{2}O	152.05	monoclinic	a = 7.9481 Å, b = 11.3472 Å, c = 6.0425 Å, β = 117.55°, Z = 4 monoclinic: a = 6.3042 Å, b = 8.2942 Å, c = 12.760 Å, β = 98.415°, Z = 4, V = 657.416 Å^{3}	1.536			
ammonium tetrafluoroborate-monofluorophosphate	(NH_{4})_{3}[PO_{3}F][BF_{4}]	238.91	P2_{1}/m	a = 7.8384 Å, b = 6.0996 Å, c = 9.9079 Å, β = 111.990°, V = 439.24 Å^{3}, Z = 2	1.806			
	(NH_{4})_{2}PO_{3}F·NH_{4}NO_{3}	875.8	P2_{1}/n	a=10.3145 b=6.1034 c=14.3299 β=103.885° Z=4	1.624	@−73		
	(NH_{4})_{2}PO_{3}F·NH_{4}NO_{3}	877.98	P1	a=10.3414 b=6.1056 c=14.1704 α=91.248 β=101.016 γ=89.173 Z=4	1.620	@−98		
	(NH_{4})_{2}PO_{3}F·NH_{4}NO_{3}	888.48	P2_{1}pp	a=10.3182 b=6.0591 c=14.3715 β=98.563 Z=4	1.601	@−173		
	(N_{2}H_{6})[HPO_{3}F]_{2}	788.52	C12/c1	a=14.1326 b=7.0340 c=7.9877 β=96.763 Z=4	1.954	colourless; large birefringence		
sodium monofluorophosphate	Na_{2}PO_{3}F							10163-15-2
sodium hydrogen monofluorophosphate	NaHPO_{3}F	121.968						20859-36-3
sodium hydrogen monofluorophosphate dihydrate	NaHPO_{3}F·2H_{2}O	167.01	monoclinic	a = 19.112 Å, b = 5.341 Å, c = 12.72 Å, α = 110.18°, V = 1219.4 Å^{3}	1.819			
magnesium monofluorophosphate	MgPO_{3}F	122.28						
diammonium manganese dimonofluorophosphate dihydrate	(NH_{4})_{2}Mg(PO_{3}F)_{2}·2H_{2}O	292.37	C2/m	a = 13.374 Å, b = 5.3541 Å, c = 7.385 Å, β = 113.758°, V = 484.01 Å^{3}, Z = 2	2.006			
potassium monofluorophosphate	K_{2}PO_{3}F	176.17	orthorhombic	a = 7.554 Å, b = 5.954 Å, c = 10.171 Å, V = 457 Å^{3}, Z = 4 (at 20 °C)	2.57			20859-37-4 14306-73-1
	K_{2}PO_{3}F·KF							
Potassium hydrogen monofluorophosphate	KHPO_{3}F		monoclinic	a = 7.273 Å, b = 14.086 Å, c = 7.655 Å, β = 90.13°, Z = 8, V = 784.233 Å^{3}				
Tripotassium hydrogen monofluorophosphate	K_{3}H(PO_{3}F)_{2}		monoclinic	a = 7.973 Å; b = 11.635 Å; c = 9.668 Å, β = 113.52°, Z = 4, V = 822.35 Å^{3}				
Ammonium dipotassium hydrogen difluorophosphate	NH_{4}K_{2}H(PO_{3}F)_{2}							
calcium monofluorophosphate dihydrate	CaPO_{3}F·2H_{2}O		triclinic	a = 8.6497 Å, b = 6.4614 Å, c = 5.7353 Å, α = 119.003°, β = 110.853°, γ = 94.146°, V = 249.943 Å^{3}, Z = 2	2.313			37809-19-1
calcium monofluorophosphate hemihydrate	CaPO_{3}F·0.5H_{2}O							
vanadium monofluorophosphate	VPO_{3}F	148.91						
chromium(III) monofluorophosphate	Cr_{2}(PO_{3}F)_{3}·18.8H_{2}O	736.88	triclinic	a = 11.594 Å, b = 15.292 Å, c = 15.360 Å, α = 83.804°, β = 84.203, γ = 82.597, V = 2674.1 Å^{3}, Z = 4	1.830			
ammonium chromium(III) difluorophosphate hexahydrate	NH_{4}Cr(PO_{3}F)_{2}·6H_{2}O	9.4489	R3_{m}	a = 6.5491 Å, c = 25.438 Å, Z = 3	1.972	green		
manganese(II) fluorophosphate dihydrate	MnPO_{3}F·2H_{2}O	188.94	triclinic	a = 5.528 Å, b = 5.636 Å, c = 8.257 Å, α = 81.279°, β = 75.156°, γ = 71.722°, Z = 2				
diammonium manganese monofluorophosphate	(NH_{4})_{2}Mn(PO_{3}F)_{2}·2H_{2}O	500.9	P2_{1}/n	a = 12.558 Å, b = 5.5456 Å, c = 7.422 Å, β = 99.918°, Z = 2	2.142	pink		
ammonium trimanganese dimonofluorophosphate difluorophosphate difluoride	(NH_{4})Mn_{3}(PO_{3}F)_{2}(PO_{2}F_{2})F_{2}	517.8		monoclinic: a = 20.3151 Å, b = 7.6382 Å, c = 7.8312 Å, β = 103.589°, V = 1181.16 Å^{3}	2.9116			
	(NH_{4})_{4}Fe_{5}(PO_{4})_{2}(PO_{3}F)_{2}F_{4}(OH)_{2}		C2/c	a = 19.6961 b = 6.4340 c = 17.9922 β = 117.567°				
diammonium cobalt dimonofluorophosphate dihydrate	(NH_{4})_{2}Co(PO_{3}F)_{2}·2H_{2}O	326.99	C2/m	a = 13.386 Å, b = 5.3476 Å, c = 7.390 Å, β = 114.02°, V = 483.2 Å^{3}, Z = 2	2.247			
ammonium tricobalt dimonofluorophosphate difluorophosphate difluoride	(NH_{4})Co_{3}(PO_{3}F)_{2}(PO_{2}F_{2})F_{2}	529.7	monclinic	a = 19.9678 Å, b = 7.4883 Å, c = 7.5679 Å, β = 102.676°, V = 1104.01 Å^{3}	3.1871			
Diammonium nickel dimonofluorophosphate hexahydrate	(NH_{4})_{2}Ni(PO_{3}F)_{2}·6H_{2}O	680.27	monclinic	a = 6.2700 Å, b = 12.2845 Å, c = 9.1894 Å, β = 106.033°, Z = 2	1.947	blue Tutton		
copper monofluorophosphate	CuPO_{3}F·5H_{2}O	251.59						
basic copper potassium monofluorophosphate	Cu_{2}K(OH)(PO_{3}F)_{2}·5H_{2}O		monclinic	a = 9.094 Å, b = 6.333 Å, c = 7.75 Å, β = 117.55°, Z = 2		natrochalcite		
diammonium diaquabis(monofluorophosphato) copper	Cu(NH_{4})_{2}(PO_{3}F)_{2}·2H_{2}O	331.6	monclinic	a = 13.454 Å, b = 5.243 Å, c = 7.518 Å, β = 114.59°, V = 482.2 Å^{3}, Z = 2	2.28			
basic tetraammonium dicopper dimonofluorophosphate	NH_{4}Cu_{2}OH(PO_{3}F)_{2}·H_{2}O	410.80	C2/m	a = 9.1012 Å, b = 6.4121 Å, c = 7.8506 Å, β = 116.277°, Z = 2	3.040	light blue natrochalcite		
zinc monofluorophosphate	ZnPO_{3}F·2.5H_{2}O	163.35	triclinic	a = 7.6020 Å, b = 7.6490 Å, c = 9.4671 Å, α = 88.633°, β = 88.888°, γ = 87.182°, V = 549.58 Å^{3}, Z = 4	2.518			68705-59-9
anhydrous diammonium zinc tetramonofluorophosphate	(NH_{4})_{2}Zn_{3}(PO_{3}F)_{4}		cubic	a = 11.4769 Å				
diammonium zinc dimonofluorophosphate	(NH_{4})_{2}Zn(PO_{3}F)_{2}·0.2H_{2}O	2834.4	C2/c	a = 18.936 Å, b = 7.6955 Å, c = 20.528 Å, β = 108.641° Z = 12	2.117	colourless		
diammonium trizinc tetramonofluorophosphate	(NH_{4})_{2}Zn_{3}(PO_{3}F)_{4}·H_{2}O	1469.6	I4_{3}d	a = 11.3693 Å, Z = 4	2.902	colourless		
rubidium monofluorophosphate	Rb_{2}PO_{3}F	268.9		orthorhombic: a = 7.8714 Å, b = 6.1236 Å, c = 10.5424 Å, V = 508.15 Å^{3}, Z = 4 (at 17 °C)	3.514			
Rubidium hydrogen monofluorophosphate	RbHPO_{3}F			monoclinic: a = 7.465 Å, b = 15.551 Å, c = 7.563 Å, β = 105.38°, V = 846.533 Å^{3}, Z = 8				
	Na_{1.5}Rb_{0.5}PO_{3}F·H_{2}O	267.97		orthorhombic Pmn2_{1}: a = 6.015 Å, b = 8.965 Å, c = 4.9689 Å, Z = 2	2.398	colourless		
strontium monofluorophosphate	SrPO_{3}F	185.59		monoclinic				
strontium monofluorphosphate hydrate	SrPO_{3}F·H_{2}O	185.59						
silver monofluorophosphate	Ag_{2}PO_{3}F	313.7		monoclinic: a = 9.245 Å, b = 5.585 Å, c = 14.784 Å, β = 90.178°, Z = 8				
trisilver ammonium monofluorophosphate	NH_{4}Ag_{3}(PO_{3}F)_{2}	537.59		monoclinic: a = 30.895 Å, b = 5.5976 Å, c = 9.7522 Å, β = 90.027°, V = 1686.6 Å^{3}, Z = 8	4.234			
cadmium monofluorophosphate	CdPO_{3}F·2H_{2}O	246.40		triclinic P1_: a = 5.2678 Å, b = 6.6697 Å, c = 7.7037 Å, α = 65.506°, β = 85.919°, γ = 75.394°, V = 238.584 Å^{3}, Z = 2	3.430			
cadmium ammonium monofluorophosphate chloride dihydrate	Cd_{2.5}(NH_{4})_{2}(PO_{3}F)_{3}Cl·2H_{2}O			P2_{1}/c a=14.3778 b=11.227 c=9.1992 β=97.204°		colourless		
tin monofluorophosphate	SnPO_{3}F·2.5H_{2}O	216.68		monoclinic				52262-58-5
caesium monofluorophosphate	Cs_{2}PO_{3}F	363.8		orthorhombic: a = 8.308 Å, b = 6.3812 Å, c = 11.036 Å, V = 585.1 Å^{3}, Z = 4 (at −33 °C)	4.129			
caesium hydrogen monofluorophosphate	CsHPO_{3}F	231.89		monoclinic: a = 14.478 Å, b = 5.929 Å, c = 5.413 Å, β = 103.30°, V = 452.2 Å^{3}, Z = 4				
tricaesium diammonium hydrogen monofluorophosphate	Cs_{3}(NH_{4})_{2}H_{3}(PO_{3}F)_{4}	829.72		monoclinic: a = 20.619 Å, b = 12.076 Å, c = 15.856 Å, β = 102.58°, V = 3853 Å^{3}, Z = 8				
barium monofluorophosphate	BaPO_{3}F	235.299		monoclinic: a = 11.3105 Å, b = 8.6934 Å, c = 9.2231 Å, β = 127.819°, Z = 4 orthorhombic				15600-53-0
	Ba_{2}Mn_{2}(PO_{3}F)F_{6}			P2_{1}/c a=12.2502 b=7.5652 c=9.8385 β=102.592°				
	Ba_{2}Co_{2}(PO_{3}F)F_{6}			P2_{1}/c a=12.0976 b=7.4462 c=9.6777 β=102.157)°				
	Ba_{2}Ni_{2}(PO_{3}F)F_{6}			P2_{1}/n a=12.2625 b=7.2639 c=9.4763 β=99.745°				
	Ba_{2}Cu_{2}(PO_{3}F)F_{6}			P2_{1}/c a=12.2053 b =7.3547 c=9.6569 β =102.838°				
	KBaSr(PO_{2}F_{2})(PO_{3}F)_{2}		P2_{1}/c	a = 7.0638, b = 7.4306 c = 21.3633 β = 93.386°, V = 1119.37(3) Å^{3} Z = 4,		birefringence 0.042@550 nm		
Mercurous monofluorophosphate	Hg_{2}PO_{3}F			orthorhombic: a = 9.406 Å, b = 12.145 Å, c = 8.567 Å, V = 978.7 Å^{3}, Z = 8				
lead monofluorophosphate	PbPO_{3}F			orthorhombic: a = 6.95 Å, b = 8.52 Å, c = 5.47 Å	6.24			
dilead monofluorophosphate dichloride hydrate	Pb_{2}(PO_{3}F)Cl_{2}·H_{2}O	601.27		orthorhombic Pnma: a = 20.486 Å, b = 5.3967 Å, c = 6.9722 Å, V = 770.8 Å^{3}, Z = 4	5.181			
ditheylammonium hydrogen monofluorophosphate	[NH_{2}(CH_{2}CH_{3})_{2}]HPO_{3}F	173.12		orthorhombic: a = 12.892 Å, b = 9.530 Å, c = 13.555 Å, α = 90°, V = 1665 Å^{3}	1.381			
tetramethylammonium monofluorophosphate	[N(CH_{3})_{4}]_{2}PO_{3}F	246.26						
tetraethylammonium monofluorophosphate	[N(CH_{2}CH_{3})_{4}]_{2}PO_{3}F	358.47						
tetrabutylammonium monofluorophosphate	[N(CH_{2}CH_{2}CH_{2}CH_{3})_{4}]_{2}PO_{3}F	582.90						
piperazinium hydrogen monofluorophosphate	[PipzH_{2}]HPO_{3}F	286.11		monoclinic: a = 6.020 Å, b = 13.012 Å, c = 7.285 Å, α = 95.09°, V = 568.4 Å^{3}	1.672			
glutamine monofluorophosphate monohydrate	C_{5}H_{12}N_{2}O_{3}PFO_{3}	246.131						
glutamine monofluorophosphate disodium dichloride	C_{10}H_{20}Cl_{2}FN_{4}Na_{2}O_{9}P	507.146						
anilinium hydrogen monofluorophosphate	[C_{6}H_{8}N]^{+}[HPO_{3}F]^{−}	193.12		monoclinic: a = 9.418 Å, b = 14.31 Å, c = 6.303 Å, β = 92.45°, V = 859 Å^{3}, Z = 4	1.51			
Tris(2-carbamoylguanidinium) hydrogen fluorophosphonate fluorophosphonate monohydrate	[C_{2}H_{7}N_{4}O^{+}]_{3}[HPO_{3}F]^{−}[PO_{3}F]^{2−}·H_{2}O			triclinic: a = 6.7523 Å, b = 8.2926 Å, c = 9.7297 Å, α = 100.630°, β = 90.885°, γ = 99.168°, V = 528.05 Å^{3}				
bis(2-carbamoylguanidinium) fluorophosphonate dihydrate	[C_{2}H_{7}N_{4}O^{+}]_{2}[PO_{3}F]^{2−}·2H_{2}O							

=== Organic ===
Name	Formula	Formula weight		ref	ChemSpider	PubChem	CAS
dimethyl fluorophosphate	(CH_{3})_{2}PO_{2}F	128.039			72304	80052	5954-50-7
methyl ethyl fluorophosphate	(CH_{3})(CH_{3}CH_{2})PO_{2}F						
1-[ethoxy(fluoro)phosphoryl]oxyethane	(CH_{3}CH_{2})_{2}PO_{2}F	156.093				67752	358-74-7
isoflurophate	[(CH_{3})_{2}CH]_{2}PO_{2}F	184.147			5723	5936	55-91-4
1-[fluoro(2-oxopropoxy)phosphoryl]oxypropan-2-one		212.113				129718773	
isobutyl methyl fluorophosphate		170.12				129684440	
1-[fluoro(methoxy)phosphoryl]oxypentane	(CH_{3})(CH_{3}CH_{2}CH_{2}CH_{2}CH_{2})PO_{3}F	184.147				129761096	
1-[fluoro(propoxy)phosphoryl]oxypropane	(CH_{3}CH_{2}CH_{2})_{2}PO_{3}F	184.147			4954063	6451603	381-45-3
O-isopropyl propyl fluorophosphonate	(CH_{3})_{2}CH(CH_{3}CH_{2}CH_{2})PO_{3}F	184.147				88538036	
O-1-methylbutyl ethyl fluorophosphonate		198.174				129761095	
dibutyl fluorophosphate	(CH_{3}CH_{2}CH_{2}CH_{2})_{2}PO_{3}F	212.201			11640560	13025172	674-48-6
di-sec-butyl fluorophosphate	[CH_{3}CH_{2}CH(CH_{3})]_{2}PO_{3}F	212.201			92528	102452	625-17-2
di(1,3-dimethyl-n-butyl) fluorophosphate	[(CH_{3})_{2}CHCH_{2}CH(CH_{3})]_{2}PO_{3}F	268.309			91838	101643	311-60-4
1-[fluoro(2-methylpentan-3-yloxy)phosphoryl]oxyoctane		296.363				129760905	
methyl arachidonoyl fluorophosphonate		400.471				11741711	9916415
12-[fluoro(propan-2-yloxy)phosphoryl]oxydodec-1-ene		308.374				129892247	
bis(4-phenylbutyl) fluorophosphate	(C_{6}H_{5}CH_{2}CH_{2}CH_{2}CH_{2})_{2}PO_{3}F	364.397			162961	187452	85473-46-7
3′-fluoro-3′-deoxythymidine 5′-fluorophosphate		326.193			2339398	3081896	152829-59-9
cytidine 5′-fluorophosphate		325.189				87861929	68521-86-8
chlorofluoromethylideneamino-2-chloroethyl fluorophosphate	ClFC=NClCH_{2}CH_{2}PO_{3}F		A-230 Novichok agent				
chlorofluoromethylideneamino-1-methyl-2-chloroethyl fluorophosphate	ClFC=NClCH_{2}CH(CH_{3})PO_{3}F		A-232 Novichok agent				
chlorofluoromethylideneamino-1,2-dimethyl-2-chloroethyl fluorophosphate	ClFC=NCl(CH_{3})CHCH(CH_{3})PO_{3}F		A-234 Novichok agent				

== Uses ==
Zinc monofluorophosphate can be used as a corrosion inhibitor for steel when salt is present.

Glutamine monofluorophosphate has been used as a fluoride-bearing medicine.

== Other reading ==
- Leblanc, Marc; Maisonneuve, Vincent; Tressaud, Alain (2014). "Crystal Chemistry and Selected Physical Properties of Inorganic Fluorides and Oxide-Fluorides". Chemical Reviews. 115 (2): 1191–1254. doi:10.1021/cr500173c. ISSN 0009-2665. PMID 25135645.
