= Ammonium hexafluoroarsenate =

Identifiers
3D model (JSmol)	Interactive image
PubChem CID	14205731
- InChI: InChI=1S/AsF6.H3N/c2-1(3,4,5,6)7;/h;1H3/q-1;/p+1 Key: CXAUDRIMGKYIRL-UHFFFAOYSA-O
- SMILES: [NH4+].F[As-](F)(F)(F)(F)F

Properties
Chemical formula	AsF_{6}H_{4}N
Molar mass	206.951 g·mol^{−1}
Appearance	colourless crystals
Density	2.769 g/cm^{3}

Hazards
- GHS labelling
Pictograms	(GHS06: Toxic) (GHS08: Health hazard) (GHS09: Environmental hazard)
Signal word	Danger
- Except where otherwise noted, data are given for materials in their standard state (at 25 °C [77 °F], 100 kPa). Infobox references

Ammonium hexafluoroarsenate is an inorganic chemical compound with the chemical formula NH_{4}AsF_{6}.

== Synthesis ==
Arsenic pentoxide is mixed with an excess of ammonium fluoride; the mixture is fused to produce ammonium hexafluoroarsenate:

AsF_{5} + NH_{4}F → NH_{4}AsF_{6}

Also, reaction of arsenic trifluoride, hydrofluoric acid, and ammonia:

AsF_{3} + HF + NH_{4} → NH_{4}AsF_{6}

Treatment of hexafluoroarsenic acid and ammonia:

HAsF_{6} + NH_{3} → NH_{4}AsF_{6}

== Physical properties ==
Ammonium hexafluoroarsenate crystallizes rhombohedral with the KOsF_{6} structure type, with parameters: a = 7.459(3) Å, c = 7.543(3) Å (at 200 K), Z = 3, unit cell volume 363.4 Å^{3}, space group R3̅ (No. 148).
