= F6P =

F6P may refer to:

- Fructose 6-phosphate
- Hexafluorophosphate
