= Sodium monofluorophosphate =

Names
- IUPAC name Disodium phosphorofluoridate
- Other names: Sodium fluorophosphate; Sodium monofluorophosphate

Identifiers
CAS Number	10163-15-2
3D model (JSmol)	Interactive image
ChEBI	CHEBI:86431
ChEMBL	ChEMBL1200892
ChemSpider	22686
ECHA InfoCard	100.030.381
EC Number	233-433-0
PubChem CID	24266
RTECS number	TE6130000
UNII	C810JCZ56Q
CompTox Dashboard (EPA)	DTXSID70872554
- InChI: InChI=1S/FH2O3P.2Na/c1-5(2,3)4;;/h(H2,2,3,4);;/q;2*+1/p-2 Key: BFDWBSRJQZPEEB-UHFFFAOYSA-L; InChI=1/FH2O3P.2Na/c1-5(2,3)4;;/h(H2,2,3,4);;/q;2*+1/p-2 Key: BFDWBSRJQZPEEB-NUQVWONBAA
- SMILES: [Na+].[Na+].[O-]P([O-])(F)=O

Properties
Chemical formula	Na_{2}FPO_{3}
Molar mass	143.949 g·mol^{−1}
Appearance	white powder
Density	3.05 g/cm^{3} (23 °C (73 °F))
Melting point	>450 °C (842 °F)
Solubility in water	69.6 g/100mL (20 °C (68 °F))

Pharmacology
ATC code	A01AA02 (WHO) A12CD02 (WHO)

Hazards
- GHS labelling
Pictograms	(GHS07: Exclamation mark)
Signal word	Warning
Hazard statements	H302
Precautionary statements	P264, P270, P301+P312+P330, P501
NFPA 704 (fire diamond)	2 0 0
Threshold limit value (TLV)	2.5 mg/m^{3} (as fluorine) (TWA)
- Lethal dose or concentration (LD, LC)
LD_{50} (median dose)	784 mg/kg (rat, oral); 220 mg/kg (rat, intraperitoneal)
LC_{50} (median concentration)	>2.1 mg/L (rat, inhalation, 4h)
- NIOSH (US health exposure limits)
PEL (Permissible)	2.5 mg/m^{3} (as fluorine)
- Except where otherwise noted, data are given for materials in their standard state (at 25 °C [77 °F], 100 kPa). verify (what is ?) Infobox references

Sodium monofluorophosphate, commonly abbreviated SMFP, is an inorganic fluorophosphate with the chemical formula Na_{2}PO_{3}F. Typical for a salt, SMFP is odourless, colourless, and water-soluble. This salt is an ingredient in some toothpastes.

== Uses ==
SMFP is best known as an ingredient in some toothpastes. It functions as a source of fluoride via the following hydrolysis reaction:

PO_{3}F^{2−} + OH^{−} → HPO^{2−}_{4} + F^{−}

Fluoride protects tooth enamel from attack by bacteria that cause dental caries (cavities).

SMFP is also used in some medications for the treatment of osteoporosis.

In 1991, sodium monofluorophosphate was found by Calgon to inhibit the dissolution of lead in drinking water when used in concentrations between 0.1 and 500 mg/L.

== Tooth decay ==
Tooth decay is caused by bacteria naturally present in one's mouth. These bacteria form a sticky, colorless soft film on the teeth called plaque. When foods containing carbohydrates (starches and sugars) are eaten, the bacteria that form plaque use the sugar as a form of energy. They also turn it into a glue-like substance that helps them stick to the surface of the tooth. The plaque produces acid, which attacks the enamel.

=== Chemistry of decay ===
Tooth enamel consists mostly of calcium hydroxyphosphate, Ca_{5}(PO_{4})_{3}OH, also known as the mineral hydroxyapatite. Apatite is a hard, insoluble compound. Acid ( H^{+}), produced especially after a high-sugar meal (or contained in the food itself), attacks the apatite:

Ca_{5}(PO_{4})_{3}OH_{(s)} + H^{+}_{(aq)} → Ca_{5}(PO_{4})^{+}_{3}_{(aq)} + H_{2}O

=== Chemistry of enamel fluoridation ===
The degradation of apatite by loss of OH^{−} causes the enamel to dissolve. The process is reversible as saliva supplies back OH^{−} to reform apatite. If fluoride (F^{−}) ions are present in saliva, fluorapatite, Ca_{5}(PO_{4})_{3}F, also forms.

Ca_{5}(PO_{4})^{+}_{3}_{(aq)} + F^{−}_{(aq)} → Ca_{5}(PO_{4})_{3}F_{(s)}

Fluorapatite resists attacks by acids better than apatite itself, so the tooth enamel resists decay better than enamel containing no fluoride.

== Preparation and structure ==
Sodium monofluorophosphate is produced industrially by the reaction of sodium fluoride with sodium metaphosphate:

NaPO_{3} + NaF → Na_{2}FPO_{3}

The process involves scission of a pyrophosphate bond, analogous to hydrolysis. SMFP can also be prepared by treating tetrasodium pyrophosphate or disodium phosphate with hydrogen fluoride.

In the laboratory, SMFP can be prepared by hydrolysis of difluorophosphate ions with dilute sodium hydroxide:

PO_{2}F^{−}_{2} + 2 NaOH → Na_{2}FPO_{3} + H_{2}O + F^{−}

=== Structure ===
The structure of the fluorophosphate anion consists of phosphorus at the center of a tetrahedron defined by three oxygen atoms and one fluorine. Formal representations depict a double bond between one oxygen atom and phosphorus, with single bonds for the other two oxygen atoms and the fluorine. In this very formal depiction, negative charge is localized on the O atoms of the single P-O bonds. SMFP is isoelectronic with sodium sulfate. The anion has C_{3v} symmetry.

== Discovery and development ==
Sodium monofluorophosphate was first described in 1929 by the German chemist Willy Lange, who was then with the University of Berlin. His fruitless attempts to prepare free monofluorophosphoric acid led him to look at the acid's esters. Together with Gerda von Krüger, one of his students, Lange thus synthesized diethyl fluorophosphate which proved to be quite toxic, being the first ever nerve agent. In the 1930s, Gerhard Schrader, working for the German company IG Farben, tried to develop synthetic insecticide. His work focused on esters of phosphoric acids and resulted in the discovery of Isoflurophate, Tabun, Soman, and Sarin. In the meantime, Lange, who was married to a Jewish woman, emigrated from Germany to the United States and started work for Procter and Gamble Company. In 1947, he and Ralph Livingston of Monsanto Company published the preparation of the free fluorophosphoric acids and mentioned the use of isoflurophate in the treatment of glaucoma and myasthenia gravis. The well known toxicity of these esters led to fears that the simple salts might also be toxic, and such fears precluded any large scale commercial use of the salts. In 1950, under sponsorship of the manufacturer of the compounds, Ozark Chemical Company, the toxicity of sodium monofluorophosphate was studied by Harold Hodge at the University of Rochester who included anti-cavity testing. In 1967 Colgate-Palmolive filed several patents on the use of sodium monofluorophosphate in toothpaste.

== Safety ==
The usual content of SMFP in toothpaste is 0.76%. The compound is used in place of sodium fluoride (NaF), particularly in children's toothpastes, because it is less acutely toxic, although both have modest toxicities. The oral LD_{50} of SMFP in rats is 784 mg/kg vs. 148.5 mg/kg for NaF. Adverse effects were observed in rats at a dosage as low as 30 mg/kg of SMFP for 14 days.
