= Hexafluoroarsenate =

Names
- Other names Hexafluoroarsenate(V)

Identifiers
CAS Number	16973-45-8
3D model (JSmol)	Interactive image
ChemSpider	21985
EC Number	acid: 241-128-9
PubChem CID	23515
- InChI: InChI=1S/AsF6/c2-1(3,4,5,6)7/q-1; Key: ZENAVJHBLNXNHN-UHFFFAOYSA-N
- SMILES: F[As-](F)(F)(F)(F)F

Properties
Chemical formula	AsF^{−}_{6}
Molar mass	188.912014 g·mol^{−1}
- Except where otherwise noted, data are given for materials in their standard state (at 25 °C [77 °F], 100 kPa). Infobox references

The hexafluoroarsenate (sometimes shortened to fluoroarsenate) anion is a chemical species with formula AsF^{−}_{6}. Hexafluoroarsenate is relatively inert, being the conjugate base of the notional superacid hexafluoroarsenic acid (HAsF_{6}).

== Synthesis ==
The first undisputed synthesis is due to Otto Ruff, Kurt Stäuber and Hugo Graf, who began with the lower-valent arsenic trifluoride, using silver(I) fluoride as both a fluorine source and oxidant:

AsF_{3} + 3 AgF + NOCl → NOAsF_{6} + AgCl + 2 Ag

In the following reaction, one mole of arsenic trifluoride, three moles of silver fluoride, and one mole of nitrosyl chloride are reacted to produce one mole of nitrosyl hexafluoroarsenate, one mole of silver chloride, and two moles of elemental silver.

Modern syntheses usually begin with arsenic pentafluoride (AsF_{5}), which abstracts fluoride from common donors, such as hydrogen fluoride (HF) or cis-difluorodiazine (N_{2}F_{2}). Although the hexafluoroarsenate ion is stable against hydrolysis, the related hydroxyfluoroarsenate ion (AsF_{5}OH^{−}) is not; synthesis of hexafluoroarsenates from pentavalent arsenic oxides and aqueous hydrogen fluoride requires thermal dehydration or extensive stoichiometric excess of the latter.

== Conjugate acid and other salts ==
Like its pnictogen congeners, hexafluoroarsenate is a noncoordinating anion, a counterion used to stably store extremely reactive cations. Through the appropriate choice of fluorine donor, the synthesis of hexafluoroarsenate can also double as preparation of an exotic cation. The resulting salts are typically stable to metathesis with silver(I), ammonium, potassium, or caesium ions. Unlike the former three, caesium hexafluoroarsenate is insoluble in water.

Hexafluoroarsenic acid is an extremely strong acid. The anhydrous compound has been analyzed by X-ray crystallography, which reveals hexafluoroarsenate with a proton attached to one fluoride. The more commonly encountered hydrate is isostructural with the hydrates of hexafluorophosphoric acid and hexafluoroantimonic acid. These salts contain MF_{6}^{−} (M = P, As, Sb), HF, and water.

== Applications ==
Intercalation compounds of graphite and hexafluoroarsenic acid exhibit unusually high conductivity, leading to early proposals that the acid might serve as an electrode or electrolyte in high-energy batteries. Subsequent investigation revealed that the high conductivity occurs because both electron holes in the graphite and the hexafluoroarsenate ions themselves serve as charge carriers.

== See also ==
- Superacid – Extremely strong acid
- Hexafluorophosphate — phosphorus analogue
- Arsenic pentafluoride
- Hexafluoroantimonate
