= Hexafluorophosphoric acid =

Oxonium ion
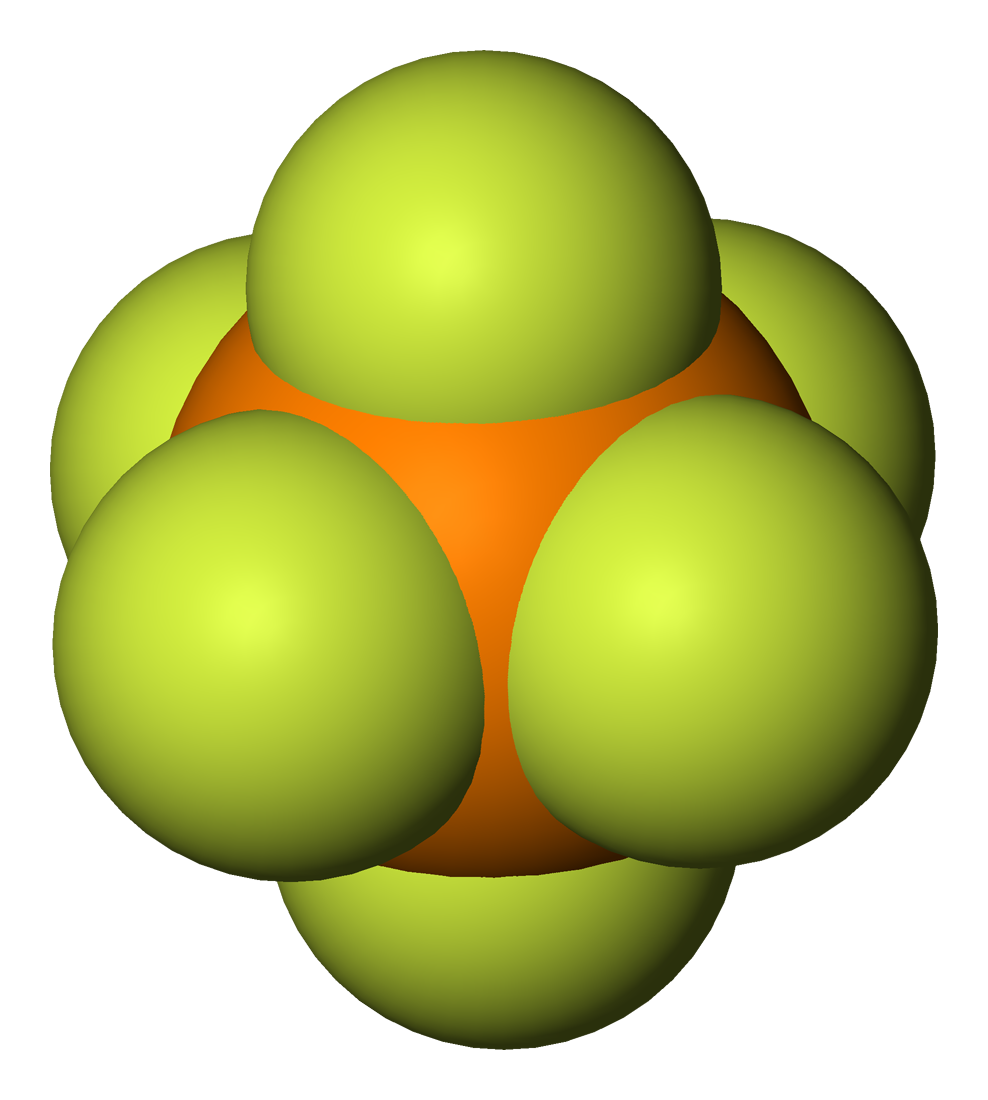
Hexafluorophosphate ion

Names
- IUPAC name Hexafluorophosphoric acid
- Other names Hydrogen hexafluorophosphate Hydron hexafluorophosphate

Identifiers
CAS Number	16940-81-1
3D model (JSmol)	Interactive image
ChemSpider	17339451
ECHA InfoCard	100.037.263
EC Number	241-006-5
PubChem CID	16211447
CompTox Dashboard (EPA)	DTXSID40884947
- InChI: InChI=1S/F6P/c1-7(2,3,4,5)6/q-1/p+1 Key: LJQLCJWAZJINEB-UHFFFAOYSA-O; InChI=1/F6P/c1-7(2,3,4,5)6/q-1/p+1 Key: LJQLCJWAZJINEB-IKLDFBCSAL
- SMILES: [H+].F[P-](F)(F)(F)(F)F

Properties
Chemical formula	HPF_{6}
Molar mass	145.972 g/mol
Appearance	colorless oily liquid
Melting point	decomposes at 25 °C
Solubility in water	exists only in solution

Hazards
- Occupational safety and health (OHS/OSH)
Main hazards	Corrosive
- GHS labelling
Pictograms	(GHS05: Corrosive) (GHS06: Toxic)
Signal word	Danger
Hazard statements	H301, H311, H314, H330
Precautionary statements	P260, P264, P271, P280, P284, P301+P330+P331, P303+P361+P353, P304+P340, P305+P351+P338, P310, P320, P321, P363, P403+P233, P405, P501
- Except where otherwise noted, data are given for materials in their standard state (at 25 °C [77 °F], 100 kPa). verify (what is ?) Infobox references

Hexafluorophosphoric acid refers to a family of salts produced by combining phosphorus pentafluoride and hydrofluoric acid. The idealized chemical formula for hexafluorophosphoric acid is HPF_{6}, which also is written H[PF_{6}]. Hexafluorophosphoric acid is only stable in solution, decomposing to HF and PF_{5} when dry. It exothermically reacts with water to produce oxonium hexafluorophosphate ([H_{3}O]^{+}[PF_{6}]^{−}) and hydrofluoric acid. Additionally, such solutions often contain products derived from hydrolysis of the P-F bonds, including HPO_{2}F_{2}, H_{2}PO_{3}F, and H_{3}PO_{4}, and their conjugate bases. Hexafluorophosphoric acid attacks glass. Upon heating, it decomposes to generate HF. Crystalline HPF_{6} has been obtained as the hexahydrate, wherein PF^{−}_{6} is enclosed in truncated octahedral cages defined by the water and protons. NMR spectroscopy indicates that solutions derived from this hexahydrate contain significant amounts of HF.

Whereas a species with the formula HPF_{6} remains unknown, the analogous molecular hexafluoroarsenic acid (HAsF_{6}) has been crystallized.

== See also ==
- Fluoroantimonic acid
