= Silver phosphate =

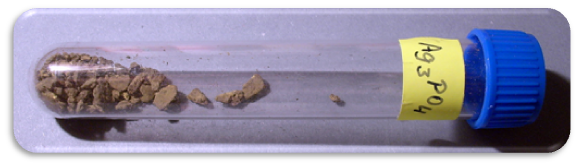

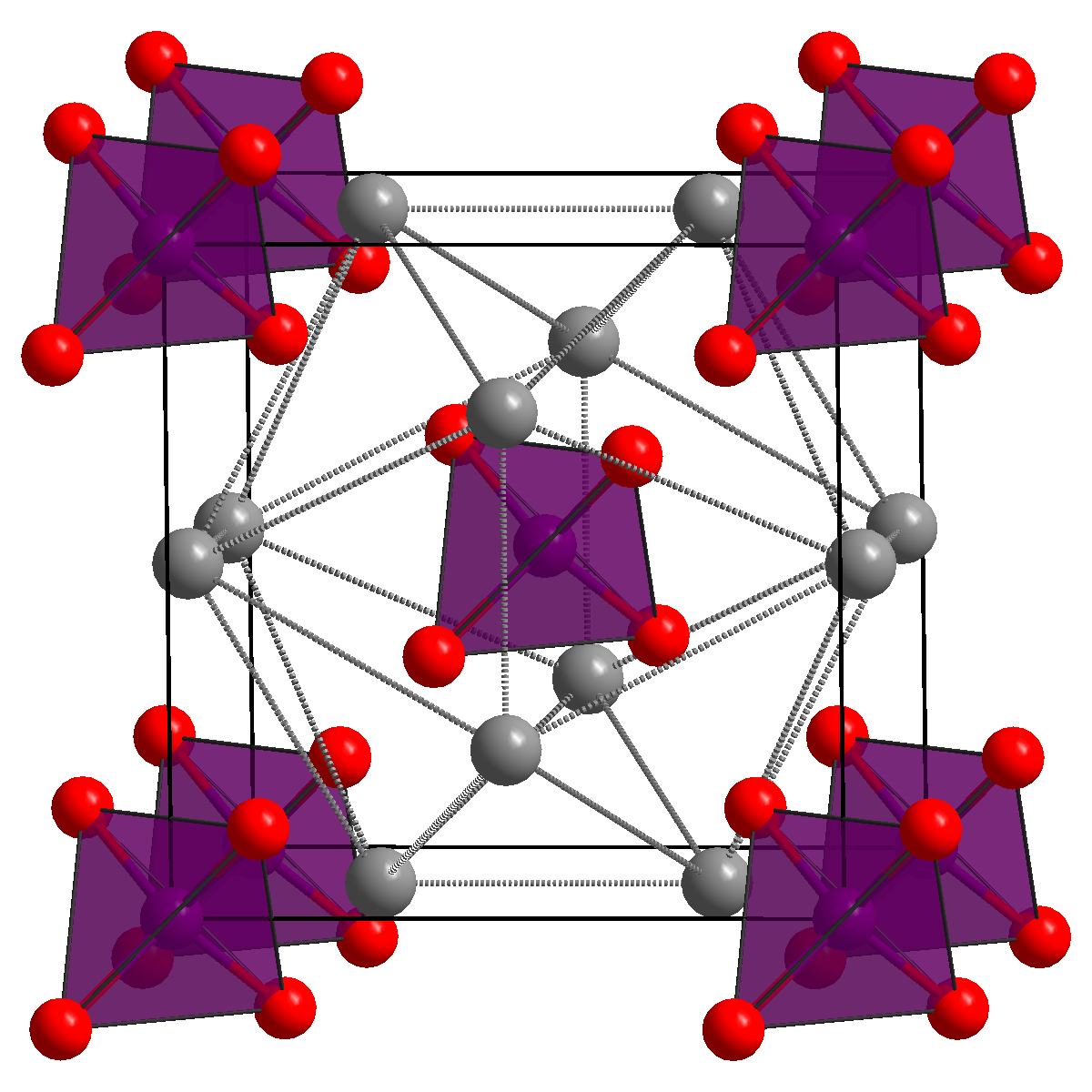

Names
- IUPAC name Silver(I) phosphate
- Other names: Argentous phosphate; Phosphoric acid, silver(I) salt; Silver phosphate

Identifiers
CAS Number	7784-09-0
3D model (JSmol)	Interactive image
ChemSpider	140592
ECHA InfoCard	100.029.135
EC Number	232-049-0
PubChem CID	159913
UNII	ZL6T4Y1XP8
CompTox Dashboard (EPA)	DTXSID5064837
- InChI: InChI=1S/3Ag.H3O4P/c;;;1-5(2,3)4/h;;;(H3,1,2,3,4)/q3*+1;/p-3 Key: FJOLTQXXWSRAIX-UHFFFAOYSA-K
- SMILES: [O-]P(=O)([O-])[O-].[Ag+].[Ag+].[Ag+]

Properties
Chemical formula	Ag_{3}PO_{4}
Molar mass	418.574 g/mol
Appearance	Translucent yellow becomes opaque or discolors when impure.
Odor	odorless
Density	6.370 g/cm^{3}
Melting point	849 °C (1,560 °F; 1,122 K)
Solubility in water	0.00065 g/100 mL
Solubility product (K_{sp})	8.89×10^{−17}
Magnetic susceptibility (χ)	−120.0·10^{−6} cm^{3}/mol

Structure
Crystal structure	cubic

Hazards
NFPA 704 (fire diamond)	2 0 0
Flash point	non-flammable
Safety data sheet (SDS)	Sigma-Alrdich
- Except where otherwise noted, data are given for materials in their standard state (at 25 °C [77 °F], 100 kPa). Infobox references

Silver phosphate or silver orthophosphate is a light sensitive, yellow, water-insoluble chemical compound composed of silver and phosphate ions of formula Ag_{3}PO_{4}.

== Synthesis, reactions and properties ==
Silver phosphate is formed as a yellow solid precipitate by the reaction between a soluble silver salt, such as silver nitrate, with a soluble orthophosphate. Its solubility product is 8.89×10^{−17} mol^{4}·dm^{−2}. The precipitation reaction is analytically significant and can be used in qualitative or quantitative analysis.

This compound dissolves in aqueous ammonia. Large crystals of silver phosphate form upon gradual evaporation of such ammoniacal solutions.

Its structure has been confirmed by X-ray crystallography.

== Uses ==
The precipitation of silver phosphate is useful in traditional analytical chemistry. Precipitation of silver phosphate is also used in silver staining of biological materials (after reduction to silver metal) - as a magnifying agent for phosphate.

Silver phosphate also found use in early photography as a light sensitive agent.

Silver phosphate exhibits antibacterial properties.

== Research ==
Silver phosphate is a high (90%) quantum yield photocatalyst for the visible light photochemical splitting of water and for production of activated oxygen by the same method.

== Other silver phosphates ==
Silver pyrophosphate Ag_{4}P_{2}O_{7} (CAS No. 13465-97-9) can be prepared as a white precipitate from reaction of silver(I) and pyrophosphate ions. Like silver orthophosphate it is light sensitive. Silver orthophosphate turns red on exposure to light. It has a density of 5.306 g/cm^{3} and a melting point of 585 °C. A hydrate also exists which decomposes at 110 °C.

Silver metaphosphate (AgPO_{3}) (CAS No. 13465-96-8) is a white solid with a density of 6.370 g/cm^{3} and a melting point of 482 °C. A hydrate also exists which decomposes at 240 °C.
