= Fluorophosphoric acid =

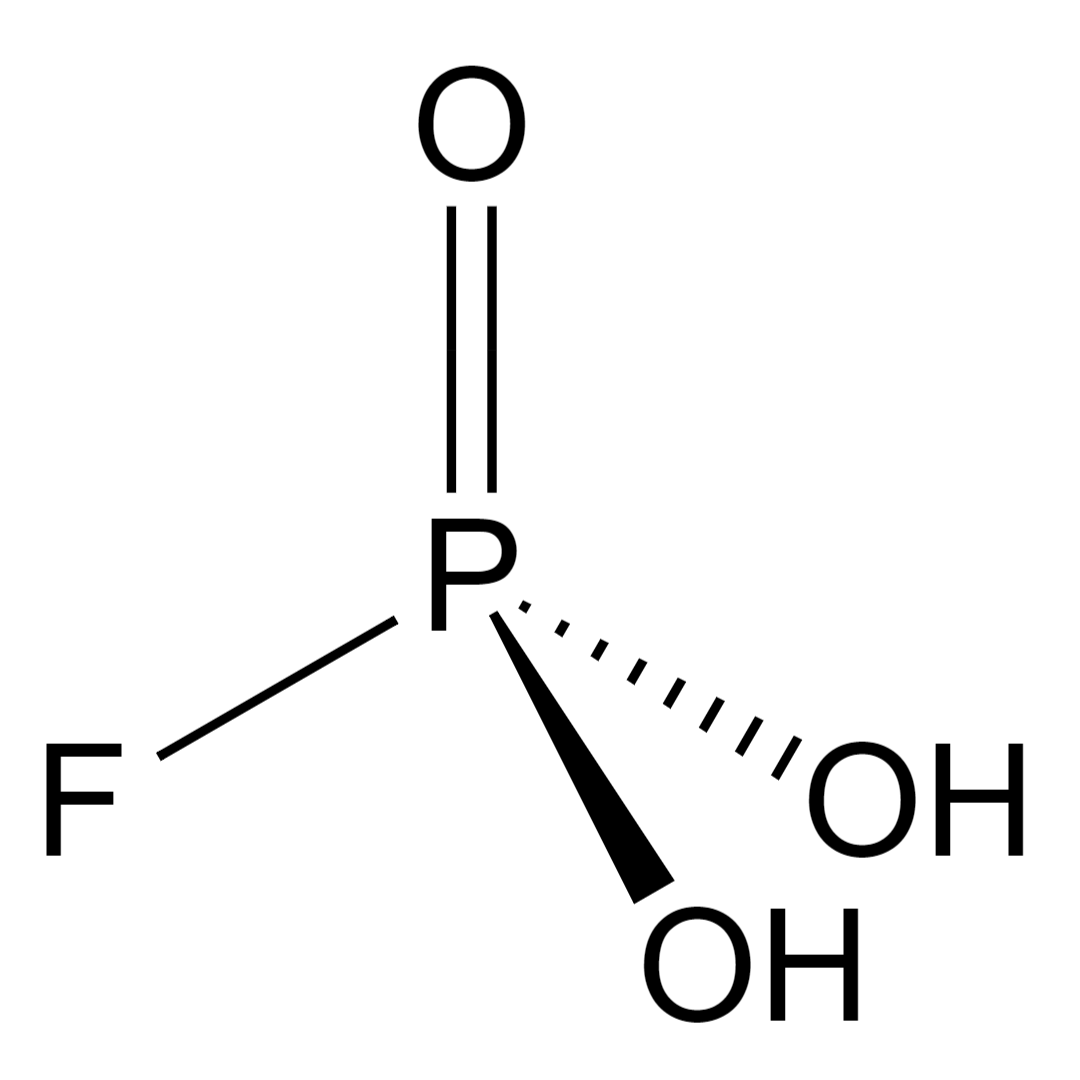

Names
- IUPAC name Fluorophosphonic acid
- Other names: Fluorophosphoric acid; Monoluorophosphoric acid; Phosphorofluoridic acid

Identifiers
CAS Number	13537-32-1
3D model (JSmol)	Interactive image
ChEBI	CHEBI:30210
ChemSpider	22687
ECHA InfoCard	100.202.790
EC Number	233-433-0
Gmelin Reference	100863
PubChem CID	24267
UNII	IW87A7KU3R
CompTox Dashboard (EPA)	DTXSID1075309
- InChI: InChI=1S/FH2O3P/c1-5(2,3)4/h(H2,2,3,4) Key: DWYMPOCYEZONEA-UHFFFAOYSA-N
- SMILES: OP(=O)(O)F

Properties
Chemical formula	H_{2}PO_{3}F
Molar mass	99.985 g·mol^{−1}
Appearance	Colorless viscous liquid
Odor	Practically odorless
Density	1.818 g/cm^{3}
Melting point	−78 °C (−108 °F; 195 K)
Boiling point	Decomposes
Solubility in water	yes
Acidity (pK_{a})	pK_{a1} = 5.5 (?) pK_{a2} = 8.5 (?)

Hazards
- Occupational safety and health (OHS/OSH)
Main hazards	Causes skin burns and eye damage.
- GHS labelling
Pictograms	(GHS05: Corrosive) (GHS06: Toxic)
Signal word	Danger
Hazard statements	H301, H311, H314, H330
Precautionary statements	P260, P264, P270, P271, P280, P284, P301+P310, P301+P330+P331, P302+P352, P303+P361+P353, P304+P340, P305+P351+P338, P310, P312, P320, P321, P330, P361, P363, P403+P233, P405, P501
- Except where otherwise noted, data are given for materials in their standard state (at 25 °C [77 °F], 100 kPa). Infobox references

Fluorophosphoric acid is the inorganic compound with the formula H_{2}PO_{3}F. It is a colorless viscous liquid that solidifies to a rigid glass upon cooling at −78 °C (−108 °F). While the bulk composition of the liquid may approximate that of fluorophosphoric acid, it is not a pure compound, which presumably accounts for its inability to be crystallized or distilled.

== Preparation ==
Fluorophosphoric acid is produced commercially by treating phosphorus pentoxide with hydrogen fluoride. A less pure product can also be prepared by hydrolysis of phosphorus oxyfluoride, a reaction that first produces difluorophosphoric acid:

POF_{3} + H_{2}O → HPO_{2}F_{2} + HF

The next steps give monofluorophosphoric acid:

HPO_{2}F_{2} + H_{2}O → H_{2}PO_{3}F + HF

== Reactions ==
Fluorophosphoric acid is a dibasic acid, with pK_{a1} of 5.5 (?) and pK_{a2} of around 8.5 (?). The conjugate bases are the monofluorophosphates, which are hydrolytically robust. When fluorophosphoric acid is diluted with water, it hydrolyzes, producing phosphoric acid. Fluorophosphoric acid is not flammable.

== Uses ==
Fluorophosphoric acid is used to make protective coatings on metal surfaces, as a metal cleaner and as an electrolytic or chemical polishing agent. The sodium salt of this acid, sodium monofluorophosphate, is the most used dentifrice additive for the reduction of tooth decay.

== Safety ==
Fluorophosphoric acid is corrosive to living tissue. It can cause severe skin burns and permanent eye damage. Ingestion can cause severe burns and permanent damage to gastrointestinal system. Inhalation of this acid may cause severe burns to respiratory system and chemical pneumonia. Inhalation, ingestion or contact with skin with this acid may cause severe injury or death. Symptoms from contact or inhalation may be delayed.
