= Difluorophosphoric acid =

Names
- IUPAC name Difluorophosphinic acid
- Other names: Difluorophosphoric acid; Fluophosphoric acid; Phosphorodifluoridic acid

Identifiers
CAS Number	13779-41-4
3D model (JSmol)	Interactive image
ChemSpider	55585
ECHA InfoCard	100.034.005
EC Number	237-421-6
PubChem CID	61681
UNII	3QNA5YG39L
UN number	1768
CompTox Dashboard (EPA)	DTXSID6065632
- InChI: InChI=1S/F2HO2P/c1-5(2,3)4/h(H,3,4) Key: DGTVXEHQMSJRPE-UHFFFAOYSA-N
- SMILES: OP(=O)(F)F

Properties
Chemical formula	HPO_{2}F_{2}
Molar mass	101.977 g·mol^{−1}
Appearance	Colorless liquid
Density	1.583 g/cm^{3}
Melting point	−96.5 °C (−141.7 °F; 176.7 K)
Boiling point	115.9 °C (240.6 °F; 389.0 K)

Structure
Molecular shape	Tetrahedral at phosphorus atom

Hazards
- Occupational safety and health (OHS/OSH)
Main hazards	Corrosive to living tissue
- GHS labelling
Pictograms	(GHS05: Corrosive)
Signal word	Danger
Hazard statements	H314
Precautionary statements	P260, P264, P280, P301+P330+P331, P303+P361+P353, P304+P340, P305+P351+P338, P310, P321, P363, P405, P501
- Except where otherwise noted, data are given for materials in their standard state (at 25 °C [77 °F], 100 kPa). Infobox references

Difluorophosphoric acid is an inorganic compound with the formula HPO_{2}F_{2}. It is a mobile colorless strongly fuming liquid. The acid has limited applications, in part because it is thermally and hydrolytically unstable. Difluorophosphoric acid is corrosive to glass, fabric, metals and living tissue.

A method to make pure difluorphosphoric acid involves heating phosphoryl fluoride with fluorophosphoric acid and separating the product by distillation:

POF_{3} + H_{2}PO_{3}F → 2 HPO_{2}F_{2}

It is prepared by hydrolysis of phosphoryl fluoride:

POF_{3} + H_{2}O → HPO_{2}F_{2} + HF

Further hydrolysis gives fluorophosphoric acid:

HPO_{2}F_{2} + H_{2}O → H_{2}PO_{3}F + HF

Complete hydrolysis gives phosphoric acid:

H_{2}PO_{3}F + H_{2}O → H_{3}PO_{4} + HF

The salts of difluorophosphoric acid are known as difluorophosphates.
