= Hexafluorophosphate =

Anion with the chemical formula PF6–

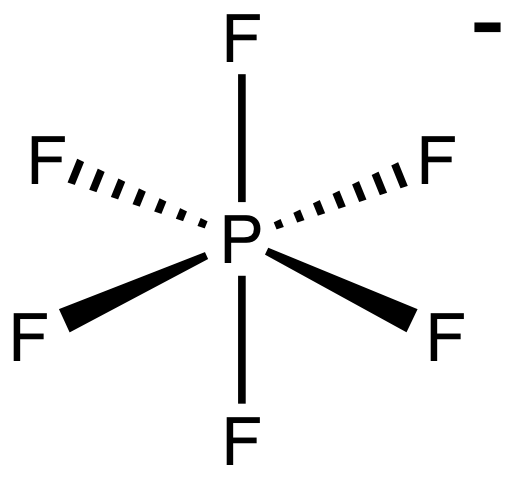
Stereo skeletal formula of hexafluorophosphate
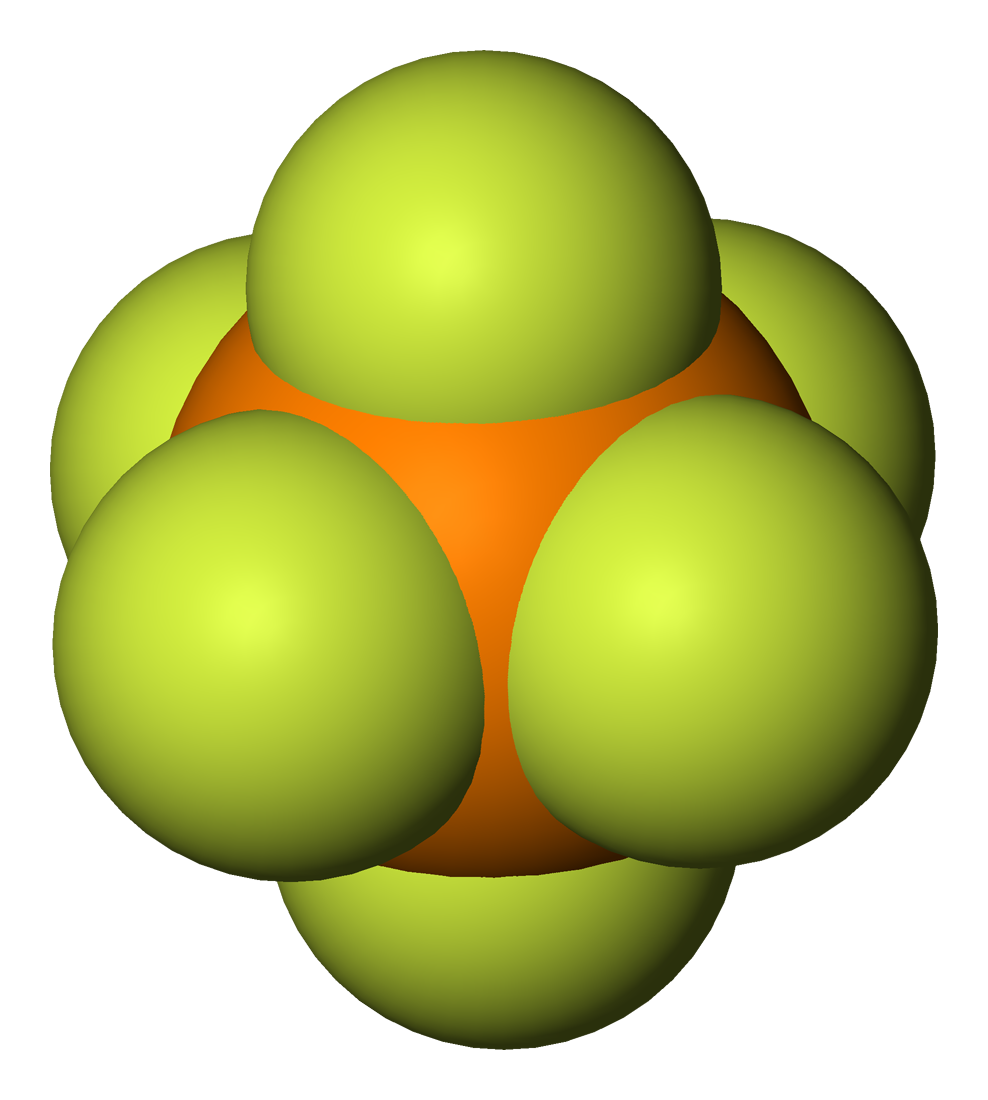
Spacefill model of hexafluorophosphate

Names
- IUPAC name Hexafluorophosphate
- Systematic IUPAC name Hexafluoro-λ^{5}-phosphanuide (substitutive); Hexafluoridophosphate(1-) (additive)
- Other names Hexafluorophosphate(V)

Identifiers
CAS Number	16919-18-9
3D model (JSmol)	Interactive image
ChEBI	CHEBI:30201
ChEMBL	ChEMBL181124 inactive
ChemSpider	9502
ECHA InfoCard	100.111.656
EC Number	605-543-2
Gmelin Reference	2704
PubChem CID	9886
UNII	8JV86J4A30
CompTox Dashboard (EPA)	DTXSID40872465
- InChI: InChI=1S/F6P/c1-7(2,3,4,5)6/q-1 Key: LJQLCJWAZJINEB-UHFFFAOYSA-N
- SMILES: F[P-](F)(F)(F)(F)F

Properties
Chemical formula	[PF_{6}]^{−}
Molar mass	144.964181 g/mol
- Except where otherwise noted, data are given for materials in their standard state (at 25 °C [77 °F], 100 kPa). verify (what is ?) Infobox references

Hexafluorophosphate is an anion with chemical formula of [PF_{6}]^{−}. It is an octahedral species that imparts no color to its salts. [PF_{6}]^{−} is isoelectronic with sulfur hexafluoride, SF_{6}, and the hexafluorosilicate dianion, [SiF_{6}]^{2−}, and hexafluoroantimonate [SbF_{6}]^{−}. In this anion, phosphorus has a valence of 5. Being poorly nucleophilic, hexafluorophosphate is classified as a non-coordinating anion.

== Synthesis ==
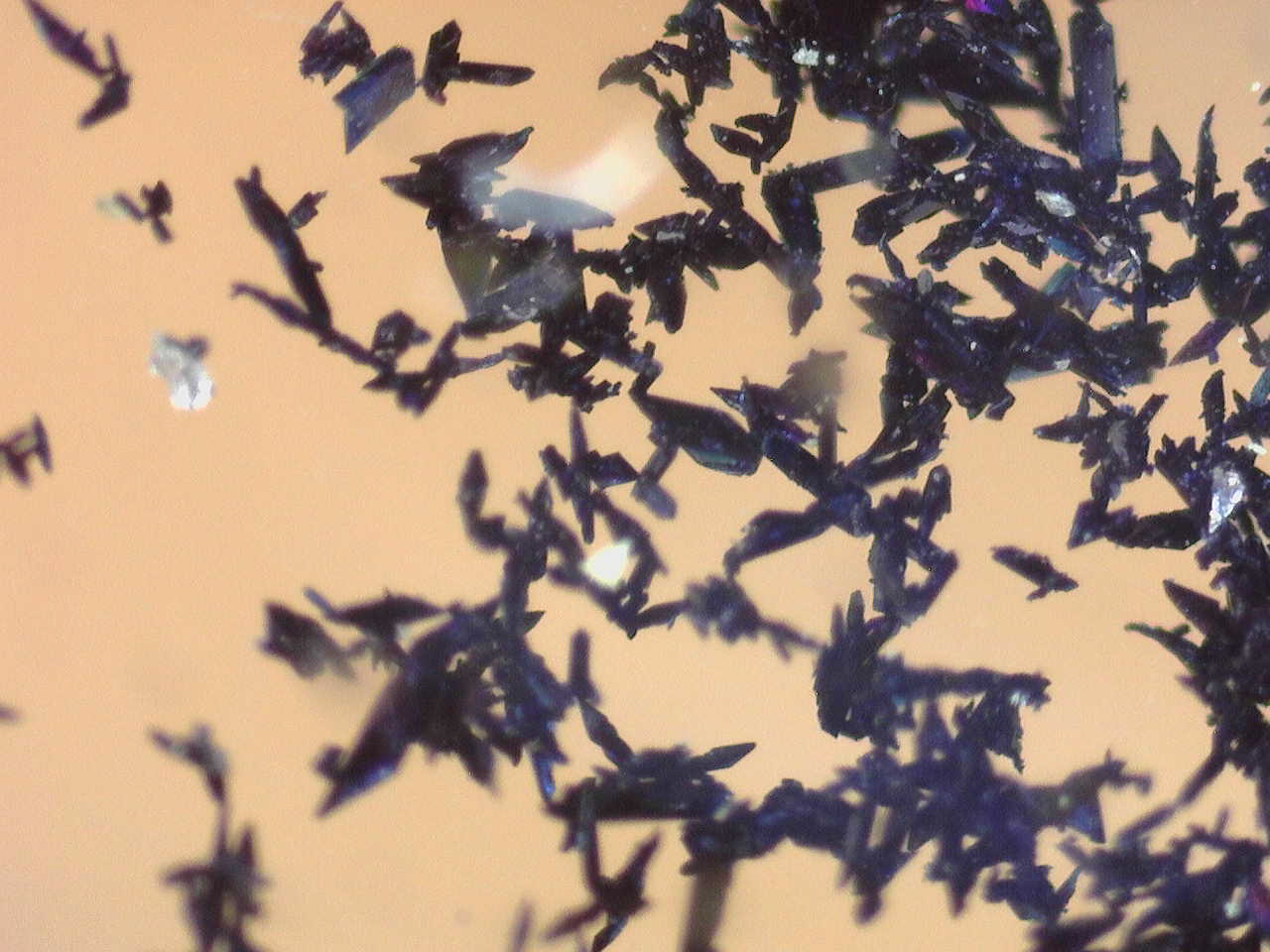
Crystals of ferrocenium hexafluorophosphate, [Fe(C_{5}H_{5})_{2}]^{+}[PF_{6}]^{−}

Hexafluorophosphate salts can be prepared by the reaction of phosphorus pentachloride and alkali or ammonium halide in a solution of hydrofluoric acid:

PCl_{5} + MCl + 6 HF → M[PF_{6}] + 6 HCl

Hexafluorophosphoric acid can be prepared by direct reaction of hydrogen fluoride with phosphorus pentafluoride. It is a strong Brønsted acid that is typically generated in situ immediately before its use.

PF_{5} + HF → H[PF_{6}]

These reactions require specialized equipment to safely handle the hazards associated with hydrofluoric acid and hydrogen fluoride.

== Quantitative analysis ==
Several methods of quantitative analysis for the hexafluorophosphate ion have been developed. Tetraphenylarsonium chloride, [(C_{6}H_{5})_{4}As]Cl, has been used both for titrimetric and gravimetric quantifications of hexafluorophosphate. Both of these determinations depend on the formation of tetraphenylarsonium hexafluorophosphate:

[(C_{6}H_{5})_{4}As]^{+} + [PF_{6}]^{−} → [(C_{6}H_{5})_{4}As][PF_{6}]

Hexafluorophosphate can also be determined spectrophotometrically with ferroin.

== Reactions ==
Hydrolysis is extremely slow under basic conditions. Acid-catalyzed hydrolysis to the phosphate ion is also slow. Nonetheless, hexafluorophosphate is prone to decomposition with the release of hydrogen fluoride in ionic liquids.

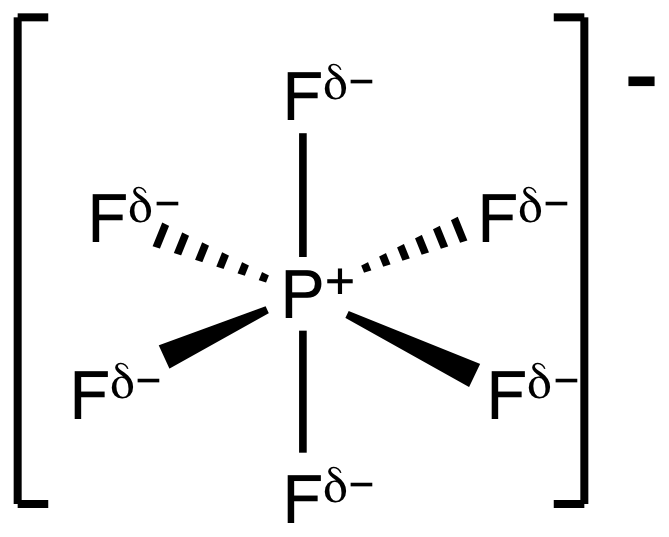
Hexafluorophosphate bears a partial (delocalized) negative charge on the fluoride centers.

=== Organometallic and inorganic synthesis ===
Hexafluorophosphate is a common counteranion for cationic metal complexes. It is one of three widely used non-coordinating anions: hexafluorophosphate, tetrafluoroborate [BF_{4}]^{−}, and perchlorate ClO^{−}_{4}. Of these, the hexafluorophosphate ion has the least coordinating tendency.

Hexafluorophosphate salts can be prepared by reactions of silver hexafluorophosphate with halide salts. Precipitation of insoluble silver halide helps drive this reaction to completion. Since hexafluorophosphate salts are often insoluble in water but soluble in polar organic solvents, even the addition of ammonium hexafluorophosphate ([NH_{4}][PF_{6}]) to aqueous solutions of many organic and inorganic salts gives solid precipitates of hexafluorophosphate salts. One example is the synthesis of rhodocenium salts: The overall conversion equation is

RhCl_{3}·nH_{2}O + 2 C_{5}H_{6} + [NH_{4}][PF_{6}] → [(η^{5}-C_{5}H_{5})_{2}Rh][PF_{6}] + 2 HCl + [NH_{4}]Cl + n H_{2}O

Tetrakis(acetonitrile)copper(I) hexafluorophosphate is produced by the addition of hexafluorophosphoric acid to a suspension of copper(I) oxide in acetonitrile:

Cu_{2}O + 2 H[PF_{6}] + 8 CH_{3}CN → 2 [Cu(CH_{3}CN)_{4}][PF_{6}] + H_{2}O

=== Hydrolysis of hexafluorophosphate complexes ===
While the hexafluorophosphate ion is generally inert and hence a suitable counterion, its solvolysis can be induced by highly electrophilic metal centers. For example, the tris(solvento) rhodium complex [(η^{5}-C_{5}Me_{5})Rh(Me_{2}CO)_{3}][PF_{6}]_{2} undergoes solvolysis when heated in acetone, forming a difluorophosphate-bridged complex [(η^{5}-C_{5}Me_{5})Rh(μ-OPF_{2}O)_{3}Rh(η^{5}-C_{5}Me_{5})][PF_{6}].

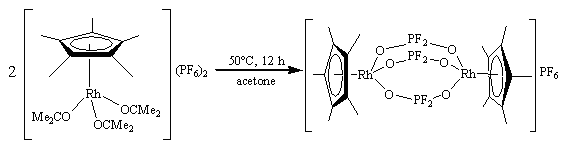

== Applications ==
Practical uses of the hexafluorophosphate ion typically exploit one or more of the following properties: that it is a non-coordinating anion; that hexafluorophosphate compounds are typically soluble in organic solvents, particularly polar ones, but have low solubility in aqueous solution; or, that it has a high degree of stability, including resistance to both acidic and basic hydrolysis.

=== Secondary batteries ===
The main commercial use of hexafluorophosphate is as its lithium salt, lithium hexafluorophosphate. This salt, in combination with dimethyl carbonate, is a common electrolyte in commercial secondary batteries such as lithium-ion cells. This application exploits the high solubility of hexafluorophosphate salts in organic solvents and the resistance of these salts to reduction by the alkali metal cathode. Since the lithium ions in these batteries are generally present as coordination complexes within the electrolyte, the non-coordinating nature of the hexafluorophosphate ion is also a useful property for these applications.

=== Ionic liquids ===
Room temperature ionic liquids such as 1-butyl-3-methylimidazolium hexafluorophosphate (typically abbreviated as bmimPF_{6}) have been prepared. The advantage of the anion exchange in favour of a non-coordinating anion is that the resulting ionic liquid has much greater thermal stability. 1-Butyl-3-methylimidazolium chloride decomposes to N-methylimidazole and 1-chlorobutane or to N-butylimidazole and chloromethane. Such decompositions are not possible for bmimPF_{6}. However, thermal decompositions of hexafluorophosphate ionic liquids to generate hydrogen fluoride gas are known.

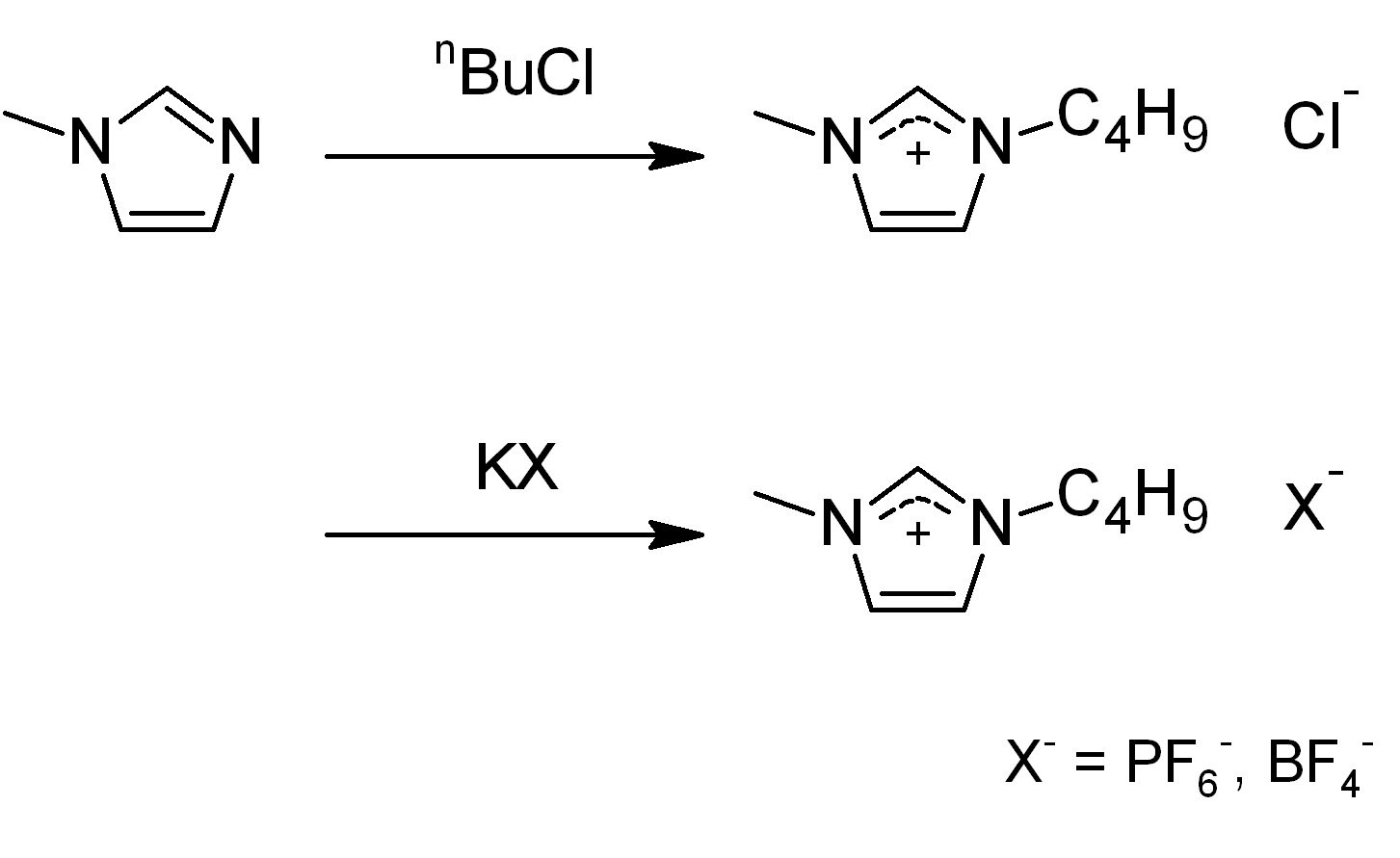
