= Phosphorus halide =

Chemical compounds containing phosphorus bound to a halogen

In chemistry, there are three series of binary phosphorus halides, containing phosphorus in the oxidation states +5, +3 and +2. All compounds have been described, in varying degrees of detail, although serious doubts have been cast on the existence of PI_{5}. Mixed chalcogen halides also exist.

== Oxidation state +5 ==
Chemical formula	CAS number	Melting point	Boiling point	P–X_{ax} bond length	P–X_{eq} bond length	X_{eq}–P–X_{eq} bond angle	X_{ax}–P–X_{eq} bond angle
PF_{5}	[7647-19-0]	-93.7 °C	-84.5 °C	153 pm	158 pm	120°	90°
PCl_{5}	[10026-13-8]	160 °C	167 °C	214 pm	202 pm	120°	90°
PBr_{5}	[7789-69-7]	~106 °C d					
PBr_{7}	[14337-11-2]						
PI_{5}		See Tornieporth-Getting & Klapötke 1990					

In the gas phase the phosphorus pentahalides have a trigonal bipyramidal molecular geometry as explained by VSEPR theory. Phosphorus pentafluoride is a relatively inert gas, notable as a mild Lewis acid and a fluoride ion acceptor. It is a fluxional molecule in which the axial (ax) and equatorial (eq) fluorine atoms interchange positions by the Berry pseudorotation mechanism. Phosphorus pentachloride, pentabromide and heptabromide are ionic in the solid and liquid states; PCl_{5} is formulated as PCl^{+}_{4}PCl^{−}_{6}, but in contrast, PBr_{5} is formulated as PBr^{+}_{4}Br^{−}, and PBr_{7} is formulated as PBr^{+}_{4}Br^{−}_{3} with the tribromide ion. They are widely used as chlorinating and brominating agents in organic chemistry.

== Oxidation state +3 ==
Chemical formula	CAS number	Melting point	Boiling point	P–X bond length	X–P–X bond angle	Dipole moment
PF_{3}	[7783-55-3]	-151.5 °C	-101.8 °C	156 pm	96.3°	1.03 D
PCl_{3}	[7719-12-2]	-93.6 °C	76.1 °C	204 pm	100°	0.56 D
PBr_{3}	[7789-60-8]	-41.5 °C	173.2 °C	222 pm	101°	
PI_{3}	[13455-01-1]	61.2 °C	227 °C	243 pm	102°	
P(CN)_{3} (pseudo-halide)		203 °C		179 pm		

The phosphorus(III) halides are the best known of the three series. They are usually prepared by direct reaction of the elements, or by transhalogenation. Phosphorus trifluoride is used as a ligand in coordination chemistry, where it resembles carbon monoxide. Phosphorus trichloride is a major industrial chemical and widely used starting material for phosphorus chemistry. Phosphorus tribromide is used in organic chemistry to convert alcohols to alkyl bromides and carboxylic acids to acyl bromides (e.g. in the Hell-Volhard-Zelinsky reaction). Phosphorus triiodide also finds use in organic chemistry, as a mild oxygen acceptor. The trihalides are fairly readily oxidized by chalcogens to give the corresponding oxyhalides or equivalents.

== Oxidation state +2 ==
Chemical formula	CAS number	Melting point	Boiling point	P–X bond length	P–P bond length	X–P–X bond angle	X–P–P bond angle
P_{2}F_{4}	[13824-74-3]	-86.5 °C	-6.2 °C	159 pm	228 pm	99.1°	98.4°
P_{2}Cl_{4}	[13467-91-1]	-28 °C	~180 °C d	not shown	not shown	not shown	not shown
P_{2}Br_{4}	[24856-99-3]	poorly characterized	poorly characterized	not reliably available	not reliably available	not reliably available	not reliably available
P_{2}I_{4}	[13455-00-0]	125.5 °C	d	248 pm	221 pm	102.3°	94.0°

Phosphorus(II) halides may be prepared by passing an electric discharge through a mixture of the trihalide vapour and hydrogen gas. The relatively stable diphosphorus tetraiodide is known to have a trans, bent configuration similar to hydrazine and finds some uses in organic syntheses, the others are of purely academic interest at the present time. Diphosphorus tetrabromide is particularly poorly described. They are subhalides of phosphorus.

P_{2}Br_{4} is a very unstable, highly reactive compound.

== Oxyhalides, thiohalides and selenohalides ==
Chemical formula	CAS number	EINECS number	Melting point	Boiling point	Density	Refractive index	Dipole moment
POF_{3}	[13478-20-1]	?		−39.7 °C	0.003596 g/cm^{3}	?	?
POCl_{3}	[10025-87-3]	233-046-7	1.2 °C	105.1 °C	1.675 g/cm^{3}	1.461	2.54 D
POBr_{3}	[7785-59-5]	232-177-7	56 °C	192 °C	2.82 g/cm^{3}	?	?
P_{2}O_{3}Cl_{4}	[13498-14-1]		?	66–68 °C (0.01 Torr)	1.74 g/cm^{3}	?	?
PSF_{3}	[2404-52-6]	?	−148.8 °C	−52.2 °C	1.56 g/cm^{3}(l)	1.353	?
PSCl_{3}	[3982-91-0]	223-622-6	-35 °C	125 °C	1.668 g/cm^{3}	1.555	?
PSBr_{3}	[3931-89-3]	?	37.8 °C	212 °C decomp	?	?	?
PSI_{3}	[63972-04-3]	?	48 °C	decomp	?	?	?

The oxyhalides may be prepared from the corresponding trihalides by reaction with organic peroxides or ozone: they are sometimes referred to as phosphoryl halides. The thiohalides, also known as thiophosphoryl halides may be prepared from the trihalides by reaction with elemental sulfur in an inert solvent. The corresponding selenohalides are also known. The oxyhalides and thiohalides are significantly more electrophilic than the corresponding phosphorus(III) species, and present a significant toxic hazard. Selenophosphoryl fluoride is unstable at room temperature, decomposing to PF_{3} and Se.
