= Phosphorus fluoride =

Phosphorus fluoride may refer to any of the following:

- Phosphorus trifluoride, PF_{3}
- Phosphorus pentafluoride, PF_{5}
- Diphosphorus tetrafluoride, P_{2}F_{4}

See phosphorus halides for a complete list of phosphorus halides.
