= Phosphorothioic chloride difluoride =

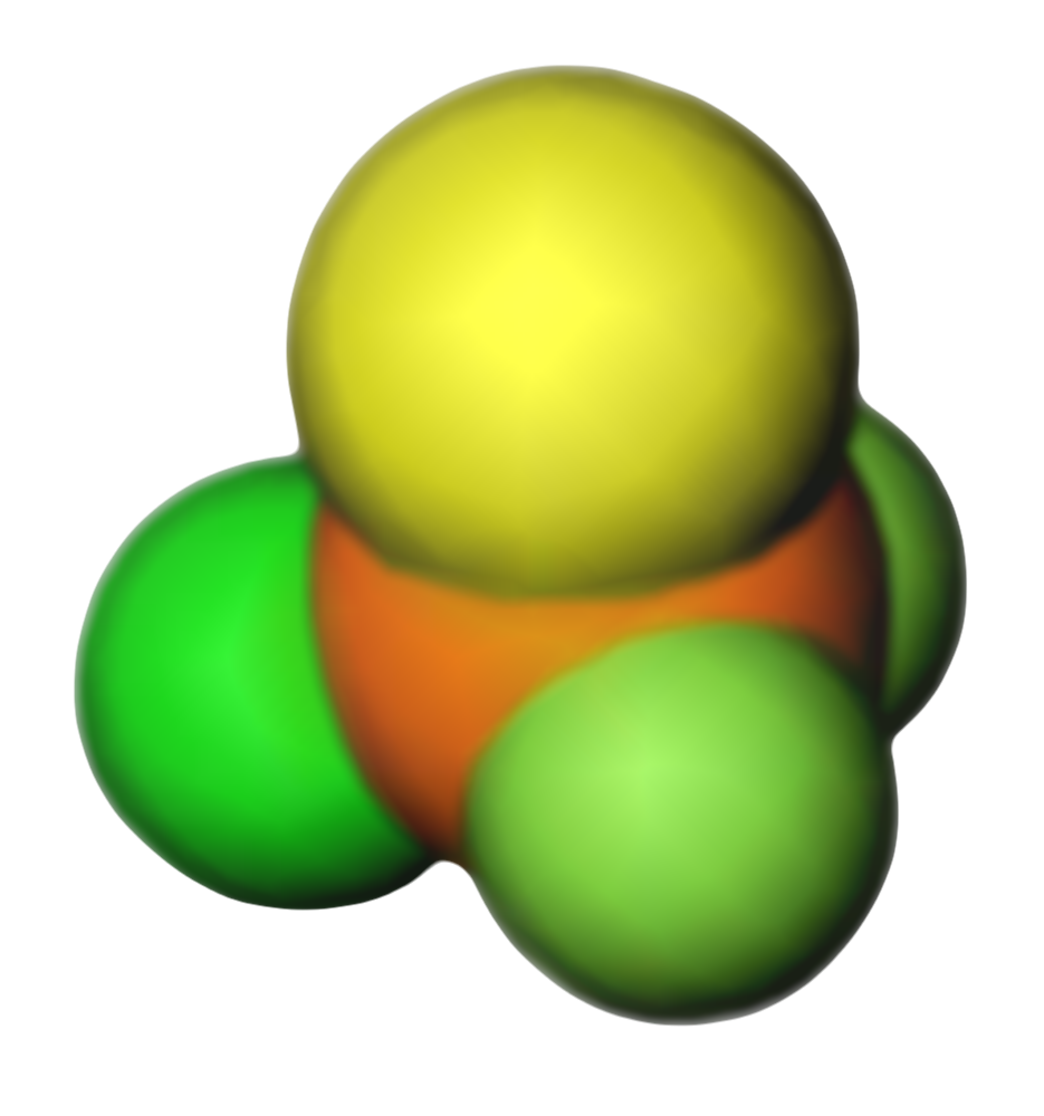

Names
- IUPAC name Phosphorothioic chloride difluoride
- Systematic IUPAC name Difluorochloro(sulfanylidene)-λ^{5}-phosphane
- Other names: Chlorodifluorophosphine sulfide; Phosphorothioic chloride difluoride; Thiophosphoryl difluoride monochloride; Thiophosphoryl difluorochloride; TL-152

Identifiers
CAS Number	2524-02-9
3D model (JSmol)	Interactive image
ChemSpider	171176
PubChem CID	197765
RTECS number	XN2990000
CompTox Dashboard (EPA)	DTXSID50179896
- InChI: InChI=1S/ClF2PS/c1-4(2,3)5 Key: PBDMSMPIDQNREV-UHFFFAOYSA-N
- SMILES: FP(=S)(F)Cl

Properties
Chemical formula	PSClF_{2}
Molar mass	136.48 g·mol^{−1}
Appearance	Colorless gas or liquid
Density	5.579 g/L as gas
Melting point	−155.2 °C (−247.4 °F; 118.0 K)
Boiling point	6.3 °C (43.3 °F; 279.4 K)

Structure
Molecular shape	Tetrahedral at the P atom

Hazards
- Occupational safety and health (OHS/OSH)
Main hazards	toxic fumes

Related compounds
Related compounds	Phosphoryl chloride difluoride; Phosphorothioic dichloride fluoride; Phosphoryl chloride difluoride; Selenophosphoryl chloride difluoride; Thiophosphoryl fluoride; Thiophosphoryl chloride; Thiophosphoryl bromide; Thiophosphoryl iodide; Phosphoryl chloride; Phosphoryl fluoride
- Except where otherwise noted, data are given for materials in their standard state (at 25 °C [77 °F], 100 kPa). Infobox references

Phosphorothioic chloride difluoride or thiophosphoryl chloride difluoride is a chemical compound with formula PSClF_{2}. It is normally found as a gas boiling at 6.3 °C and melting at −155.2 °C. The density of the gas at standard conditions is 5.579 g/L. Critical pressure is 41.4 bars, and critical temperature is 439.2 K.

== Production ==
Phosphorothioic chloride difluoride was made in 1940 by reacting PSCl_{3} with SbF_{3} and SbCl_{5} at 75 °C.

In another reaction PSCl_{3} reacts with KSO_{2}F to make PSF_{3}, KCl and SO_{2}, but also partly yields PSClF_{2}.

A small percentage of is formed when F_{2}P(=S)−S−P(−CF_{3})_{2} or (F_{3}C−)_{2}P(=S)−S−PF_{2} reacts with chlorine.

It can be formed from difluoro(germylthio)phosphine:

F_{2}P−S−GeH_{3} + Cl_{2} → GeH_{3}Cl + S=PClF_{2}

== Properties ==
Although phosphorothioic chloride difluoride does not spontaneously ignite in air, mixtures with air are explosive. The gas is hydrolysed slowly by water vapour. It also reacts with potassium hydroxide solution.

Heat of vaporization is 5703 cal/mol.

Infrared bands in the gas are at 946, 920, 738, 541, 395, 361, 317, missed, and 198 cm^{−1}. In liquid, a Raman spectroscopy has bands at 939, 913, 727, 536, 394, 359, 314, 251, 207. These are for PF_{2} symmetric stretch in a' and a'' symmetry, PS stretch, PCl stretch, PCl bend, PF_{2} scissor, PF_{2} rock, PS op-bend, and PS ip-bend.

The nuclear magnetic resonance coupling constants for ^{31}P are 1220. It is a triplet line with intensities 1:2:1. The chemical shift from orthophosphoric acid is −50×10^{−6}. For ^{19}F the coupling constant is 1218. It is a doublet line in ratio 1:1. The chemical shift from CCl_{3}F is −15.9×10^{−6}.
