= Difluorodithiophosphate =

Anion with phosphorus connected to two sulfur and two fluorine atoms

A difluorodithiophosphate is an anion or chemical compound with phosphorus connected to two sulfur atoms and two fluorine atoms. It has a single negative charge. The formula is [S_{2}PF_{2}]^{−}.

Related compounds are the fluorodithiophosphates, difluoropentathiodiphosphates ([S_{5}P_{2}F_{2}]^{2–}), fluorotrithiophosphates ([S_{3}PF]^{2–}) and the difluorothiophosphates (F_{2}P(O)S^{−}). Fluorine can also be substituted by trifluoromethyl, phenyl, methyl or ethoxy groups.

== Formation ==
Salts containing difluorodithiophosphate can be made by reacting difluorodithiophosphoric acid (HS_{2}PF_{2}) with electropositive metals. Less electropositive metals salts may be produced by a reaction of the acid with the metal oxide or chloride.

Other ways it can be produced are in a reaction of dimethylamine with thiophosphoryl fluoride (SPF_{3}).

== Properties ==
Thermal decomposition of difluorodithiopgosphate salts yields thiophosphoryl fluoride and phosphorus trifluoride.

Some compounds with two or three difluorodithiophospate groups are monomeric, dissolving in benzene, and being quite volatile, meaning they can be sublimed. Other solvents include toluene, heptane and 1,2-dichloroethane.

== List ==
formula	name	crystal	space group	unit cell	volume	density	comment	ref
H[S_{2}PF_{2}]	difluorodithiophosphoric acid	liquid					boil 72°; colourless	
[(C_{3}H_{7})_{4}N][S_{2}PF_{2}]	tetrapropylammonium difluorodithiophosphate	orthorhombic	Pbca	a=14.9466 b=14.6702 c=16.8033 Z=8	3684.5	1.151		
(CH_{3})_{3}SiSP(S)F_{2}	trimethylsilyl difluorodithiophosphate						−79.7°	
[(C_{6}H_{5})_{4}PS_{2}PF_{2}								
KS_{2}PF_{2}								
Cl_{3}Ti[S_{2}PF_{2}]								
V[S_{2}PF_{2}]_{3}	tris(difluorodithio-phosphinato)vanadium (111)						deep red-brown; mp ~46.5	
OV[S_{2}PF_{2}]_{2}							black	
Cr[S_{2}PF_{2}]_{3}							deep purple; volatile; mp 52°	
Mn[S_{2}PF_{2}]_{2}							pink	
Mn(CO)_{3}P(C_{6}H_{5})_{3}S_{2}PF_{2}							yellow; melt ~119°	
Mn(CO)_{3}P(C_{6}H_{5})_{2}C_{2}H_{4}P(C_{6}H_{5})_{2}SP(S)F_{2}							yellow-orange	
Fe[S_{2}PF_{2}]_{2}							tan mp=~80 °C	
π-C_{5}H_{5}Fe(CO)_{2}S_{2}PF_{2}	pi-cyclopentadienyl iron dicarbonyl difluorodithiophosphate						yellow-brown; decompose 95 °C	
(ON)_{2}Fe[S_{2}PF_{2}]							rusty-red; mp 69-70°	
Co[S_{2}PF_{2}]_{2}							green; mp=44° volatile	
(ON)_{2}Co[S_{2}PF_{2}]							brown	
Co[S_{2}PF_{2}]_{3}							brown mp 34° volatile	
Ni[S_{2}PF_{2}]_{2}							dark green mp ~43° volatile	
Cu[S_{2}PF_{2}]							off-white dec >400°	
(Ph_{3}P)_{2}Cu[S_{2}PF_{2}]							white dec 200°	
Zn[S_{2}PF_{2}]_{2}							mp ~157°	
Cl_{3}Nb[S_{2}PF_{2}]							ochre coloured	
Cl_{3}Nb[S_{2}PF_{2}]_{2}	trichlorobis(difluorodithio-phosphinato)niobium(Y)						orange	
Mo[S_{2}PF_{2}]_{3}							red; mp 62°; volatile	
OMo[S_{2}PF_{2}]_{2}							green	
π-C_{5}H_{5}Mo(CO)_{3}SP(S)F_{2}							red-orange; decompose ~ 102 °C	
π-C_{5}H_{5}Mo(CO)_{2}S_{2}PF_{2}							purple; melt 39°	
Pd[S_{2}PF_{2}]_{2}							orange mp 56.5° volatile	
(Ph_{3}P)Pd[S_{2}PF_{2}]_{2}							orange mp 141°	
(Ph_{3}P)_{2}Pd[S_{2}PF_{2}]_{2}							yellow dec 160°	
(p-Me-Ph_{3}P)Pd[S_{2}PF_{2}]_{2}							orange 189°	
(p-Me-Ph_{3}P)_{2}Pd[S_{2}PF_{2}]_{2}							yellow dec 172°	
(Ph_{3}As)Pd[S_{2}PF_{2}]_{2}							orange mp 122°	
(n-C_{3}H_{7})_{4}NPd[S_{2}PF_{2}]_{3}							yellow dec 160°	
Rh[S_{2}PF_{2}]_{3}							volatile	
Rh(CO)_{2}[S_{2}PF_{2}]							orange-red; mp 48°	
Rh(CO)(P(C_{6}H_{5})_{3})[S_{2}PF_{2}]							yellow	
Rh(CO)(As(C_{6}H_{5})_{3})[S_{2}PF_{2}]							brownish-red	
Rh(CO)(Sb(C_{6}H_{5})_{3})[S_{2}PF_{2}]							brownish-red	
Ru[S_{2}PF_{2}]_{3}							reddish-orange mp 54°	
RuH(CO)(S_{2}PF_{2})(PPh_{3})_{2}		triclinic	P-1	a=11.127 b=12.345 !!! c=13.689 α=88.239° β=81.183° γ=76.965° Z=2	1810.2	1.489		
RuCl(CO)(S_{2}PF_{2})(PPh_{3})_{2}		monoclinic	P2_{1}/c	a=17.325 b=10.1385 c=20.967 β=104.443° Z=4	3566	1.531		
Ru(S_{2}PF_{2})_{2}(PPh_{3})_{2}		monoclinic	C2/c	a=39.987 b=9.9967 c=21.910 β=116.810° Z=8	7731.0	1.601		
Ru(CO)(η^{1}-S_{2}PF_{2})(η^{2}-S_{2}PF_{2})(PPh_{3})_{2}	cis	triclinic	P-1	a=12.271 b=13.058 c=15.012 α=80.397° β=82.335° γ=63.243°	2113.1	1.595		
Ru(CO)(η^{1}-S_{2}PF_{2})(η^{2}-S_{2}PF_{2})(PPh_{3})_{2}	trans	monoclinic	P2_{1}/n	a=13.279 b=20.031 c=15.762 β=91.664° Z=4	4191.0	1.589		
Ag[S_{2}PF_{2}]							white mp ~150°	
Cd[S_{2}PF_{2}]_{2}							dec 173°	
(CH_{3})_{2}ClSnSP(S)F_{2}	dimethylstannyl chloride difluorodithiophosphate						melt 6.4°	
CsS_{2}PF_{2}							dec 298°	
Cl_{3}Ta[S_{2}PF_{2}]_{2}							yellow	
OWCl[S_{2}PF_{2}]_{2}							olive brown	
Cl_{2}W[S_{2}PF_{2}]_{3}							brown	
π-C_{5}H_{5}W(CO)_{3}SP(S)F_{2}							rust coloured; dec 75°	
Pt[S_{2}PF_{2}]_{2}							yellow mp ~53.5° volatile	
(Ph_{3}P)Au[S_{2}PF_{2}]							mp 98°	
Hg[S_{2}PF_{2}]_{2}							dec 163°	
Ph=phenyl; Me=methyl						g/cc	mp = melting point °C dec = decomposes	
