= Phosphoryl fluoride =

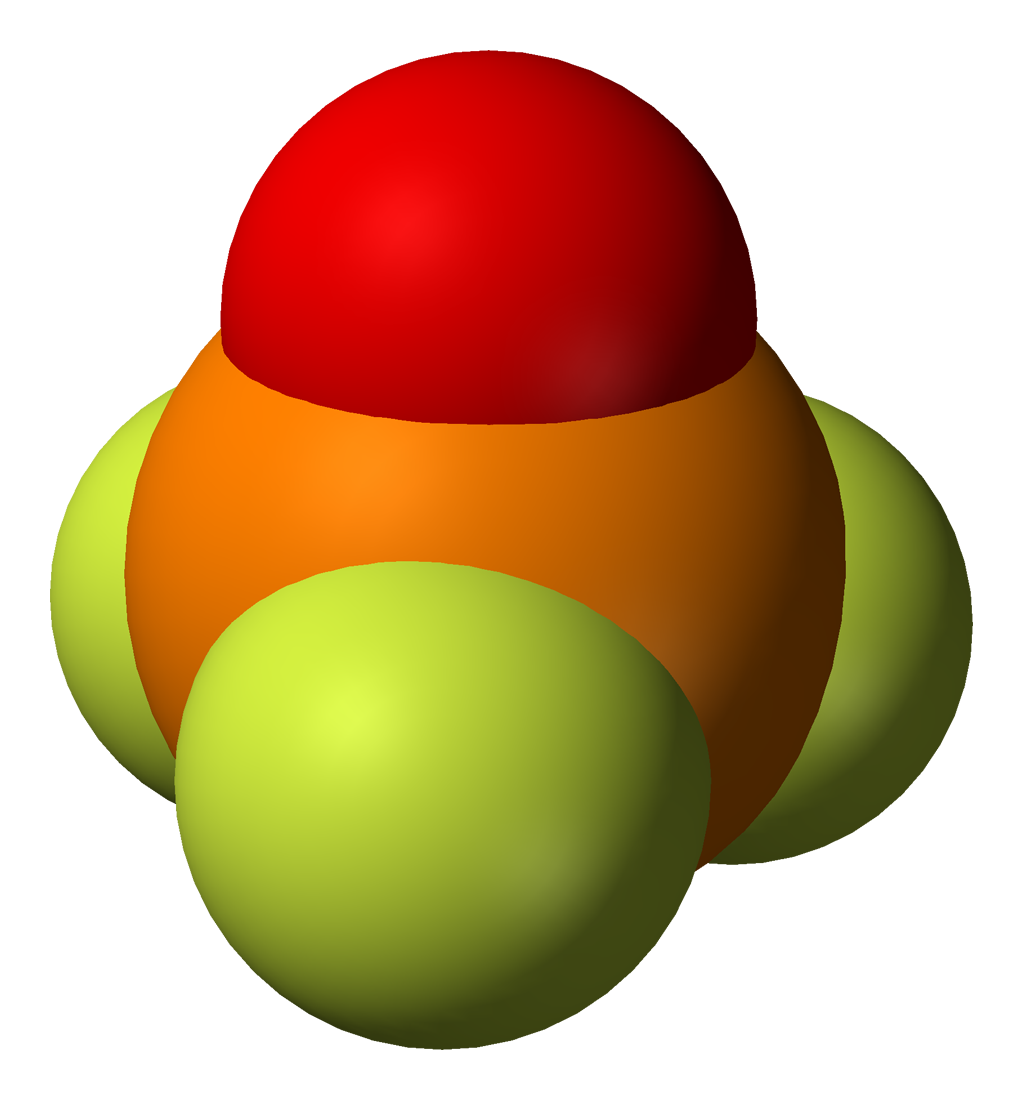

Names
- IUPAC names Phosphoryl trifluoride Phosphorus trifluoride oxide
- Other names: Phosphorus oxyfluoride; Phosphorus oxide trifluoride; Phosphorus(V) oxide trifluoride; Trifluorophosphine oxide; Trifluorophosphine P-oxide

Identifiers
CAS Number	13478-20-1
3D model (JSmol)	Interactive image; Interactive image
ChemSpider	75351
ECHA InfoCard	100.033.419
EC Number	236-776-4
PubChem CID	83516
UNII	J2907TX5WS
CompTox Dashboard (EPA)	DTXSID1065504
- InChI: InChI=1S/F3OP/c1-5(2,3)4 Key: FFUQCRZBKUBHQT-UHFFFAOYSA-N; InChI=1/F3OP/c1-5(2,3)4 Key: FFUQCRZBKUBHQT-UHFFFAOYAJ
- SMILES: F[P+](F)(F)[O-]; FP(F)(F)=O

Properties
Chemical formula	POF_{3}
Molar mass	103.9684 g/mol
Appearance	Colourless gas
Boiling point	−39.7 °C (−39.5 °F; 233.5 K)
Solubility in water	Reacts
Solubility	Reacts with alcohol and acid, soluble in diethyl ether and hydrocarbons
Dipole moment	1.76 D

Structure
Molecular shape	Tetrahedral at the P atom

Hazards
- Occupational safety and health (OHS/OSH)
Main hazards	Poison, corrosive, can form HF on contact with H_{2}O
- GHS labelling
Pictograms	(GHS05: Corrosive) (GHS06: Toxic) (GHS07: Exclamation mark) (GHS08: Health hazard)
Signal word	Danger
Hazard statements	H302, H314, H330, H372
Precautionary statements	P260, P264, P270, P271, P280, P284, P301+P312, P301+P330+P331, P303+P361+P353, P304+P340, P305+P351+P338, P310, P314, P320, P321, P330, P363, P403+P233, P405, P501
NFPA 704 (fire diamond)	3 0 2
Safety data sheet (SDS)	ICSC 0190

Related compounds
Related compounds	Phosphoryl chloride; Phosphoryl chloride difluoride; Phosphoryl bromide; Thiophosphoryl fluoride; Thiophosphoryl chloride; Thiophosphoryl chloride difluoride; Phosphorus trifluoride; Phosphorus pentafluoride
- Except where otherwise noted, data are given for materials in their standard state (at 25 °C [77 °F], 100 kPa). Infobox references

Phosphoryl fluoride (also called phosphorus oxyfluoride) is a compound with the chemical formula POF_{3}. It is a colorless gas that is hydrolyzed in aqueous solution, passing through difluorophosphate and monofluorophosphate to give ultimately orthophosphate.

== Synthesis and reactions ==
Phosphorus oxyfluoride is prepared by partial hydrolysis of phosphorus pentafluoride.

Phosphorus oxyfluoride is the progenitor of the simple fluorophosphoric acids by hydrolysis. The sequence starts with difluorophosphoric acid:

POF_{3} + H_{2}O → HPO_{2}F_{2} + HF

The next steps give monofluorophosphoric acid and phosphoric acid:

HPO_{2}F_{2} + H_{2}O → H_{2}PO_{3}F + HF
H_{2}PO_{3}F + H_{2}O → H_{3}PO_{4} + HF

Phosphoryl fluoride combines with dimethylamine to produce dimethylaminophosphoryl difluoride (H_{3}C−)_{2}N−P(=O)F_{2} and difluorophosphate and hexafluorophosphate ions (as dimethylammonium salts). The tendency of phosphoryl fluoride toward disproportionation into those ions is not, of course, paralleled by the chloride.
