= Phosphoryl chloride difluoride =

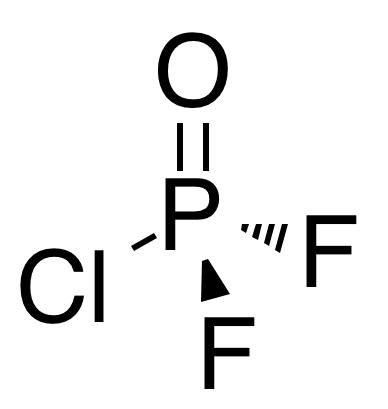

Names
- Other names Chlorodifluorophosphorus oxide, difluorophosphoryl chloride, phosphoryl chloride

Identifiers
CAS Number	13769-75-0
3D model (JSmol)	Interactive image
ChemSpider	123106
PubChem CID	139588
CompTox Dashboard (EPA)	DTXSID60160270
- InChI: InChI=1S/ClF2OP/c1-5(2,3)4 Key: BJHSNICXDHWUGU-UHFFFAOYSA-N
- SMILES: O=P(F)(F)Cl

Properties
Chemical formula	ClF_{2}OP
Molar mass	120.42 g·mol^{−1}
Density	1.6555 g/mL (liquid); 4.922 g/L (gas)
Melting point	−96.4 °C (−141.5 °F; 176.8 K)
Boiling point	3.1 °C (37.6 °F; 276.2 K)

Structure at 120 K
Crystal structure	Orthorhombic
Space group	Pnma
Lattice constant	a = 13.243, b = 5.595, c = 9.918
Lattice volume (V)	734.9
Formula units (Z)	8
Molecular shape	tetrahedral

Related compounds
Related phosphoryl halides	POF_{2}Br; POFCl_{2}; POF_{3}; PSClF_{2}
- Except where otherwise noted, data are given for materials in their standard state (at 25 °C [77 °F], 100 kPa). Infobox references

Phosphoric chloride difluoride POF_{2}Cl is a colourless gas. At one atmosphere pressure the gas condenses to a liquid at 3.1 °C and freezes at −96.4. Alternate names are difluorophosphoryl chloride or phosphoryl chloride difluoride.

== Properties ==
The critical temperature of POF_{2}Cl is 150.6°C at a critical pressure of 43.4 atmospheres. The density of the liquid at 0 °C is 1.6555 g/cm^{3}.

The shape of the molecules in POF_{2}Cl is approximately tetrahedral. The P-O distance is 1.426 Å, Both P-F distances are 1.514 Å, and the P-Cl distance is 1.940 Å. The O–P–F angle is 114.09°, the F–P–F angle is 101.2°, the O–P–Cl angle is 118.85°, and the F–P-Cl angle 103.22°. In the solid form, there are two inequivalent molecular positions. The O atom from one is close to the chlorine atom on the other position aligned roughly on the c-axis. Along the b-axis there is a zigzag of O atoms close to a P atom in the other position.

The density of the solid as calculated from crystal data is 2.177 g/cm^{3}.

In the ^{31}P-NMR spectrum (in H_{3}PO_{4}), the phosphorus atom of POClF_{2} is a triplet at 15 ppm.

When mixed with HCl, exchange of halogen atoms between molecules is catalysed, and POCl_{3}, POCl_{2}F, and POF_{3} end up in the mixture. HCl can end up in the product due to the starting materials, or contamination by water, and must be removed if POF_{2}Cl is to be stored.

== Production ==
Phosphoric chloride difluoride can be made by the reaction of liquid phosphorus pentachloride with phosphorodifluoridic acid HPO_{2}F_{2} or diphosphoridic tetrafluoride P_{2}O_{3}F_{4}. This reaction takes place at room temperature up to 60 °C. The POF_{2}Cl bubbles off as a gas, and can be condensed by cooling with dry ice-acetone mixture.

Another starting point is from potassium difluorphosphate KPO_{2}F_{2}.

Other less efficient methods involve fluorinating POCl_{3} using fluoride salts like SbF_{3} or NaF. But a mixture of fluorides results from these reactions. An even cheaper source is NaCl, CaF_{2} and P_{4}O_{10} mixture heated to 500°. Industrial scale manufacture is possible with a HF reaction with POCl_{3}.
