= Thiophosphoryl bromide =

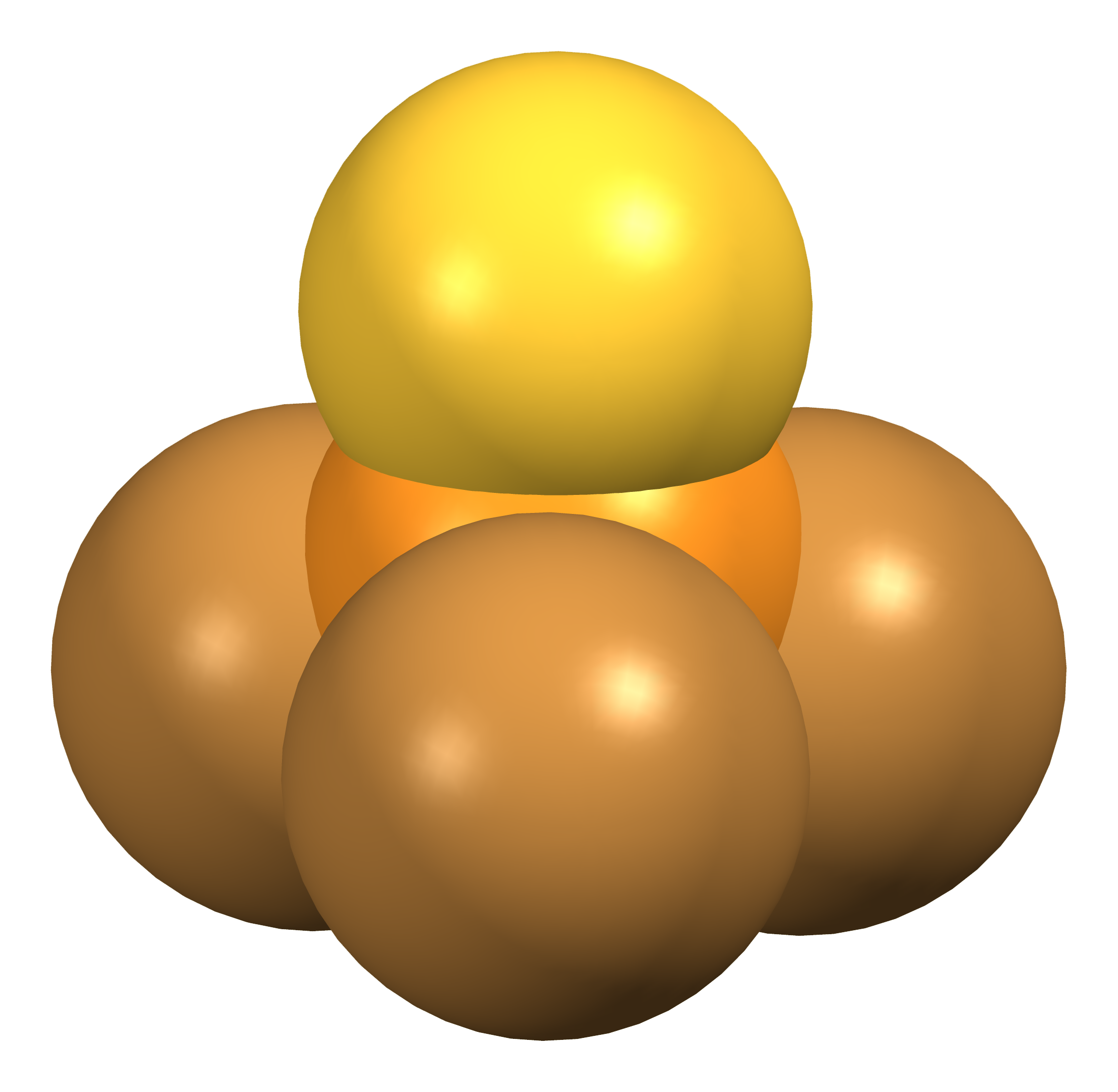

Names
- Other names Thiophosphoryl tribromide Phosphorus thiobromide Phosphorothioic tribromide

Identifiers
CAS Number	3931-89-3
3D model (JSmol)	Interactive image
ChemSpider	69937
ECHA InfoCard	100.021.367
EC Number	223-502-3
PubChem CID	77530
CompTox Dashboard (EPA)	DTXSID20960036
- InChI: InChI=1S/Br3PS/c1-4(2,3)5 Key: OWNZHTHZRZVKSQ-UHFFFAOYSA-N
- SMILES: S=P(Br)(Br)Br

Properties
Chemical formula	PSBr_{3}
Molar mass	302.75 g·mol^{−1}
Appearance	yellow crystals
Density	2.85 g cm^{−3}
Melting point	37.8 °C (100.0 °F; 310.9 K)
Boiling point	212 °C (414 °F; 485 K) decomposes

Structure
Crystal structure	Cubic
Space group	Pa3̅, No. 205
Lattice constant	a = 11.03 Å, b = 11.03 Å, c = 11.03 Å
Molecular shape	Tetrahedral at the P atom

Related compounds
Related compounds	Phosphorus tribromide; Phosphoryl bromide; Thiophosphoryl fluoride; Thiophosphoryl chloride; Thiophosphoryl iodide; Phosphorothioic chloride difluoride
- Except where otherwise noted, data are given for materials in their standard state (at 25 °C [77 °F], 100 kPa). Infobox references

Thiophosphoryl bromide is an inorganic compound with the formula PSBr_{3}.

== Preparation ==
Thiophosphoryl bromide can be prepared by heating phosphorus tribromide with phosphorus pentasulfide, or with elemental sulfur in an inert atmosphere at 130 °C.

Thiophosphoryl bromide is one product of the bromination of P_{4}S_{7} in cold carbon disulfide:

3 P_{4}S_{7} + 12 Br_{2} → 2 PBr_{3} + 2 PSBr_{3} + 2 P_{2}S_{6}Br_{2} + 2 P_{2}S_{5}Br_{4}

== Structure and properties ==
Thiophosphoryl bromide has tetrahedral molecular geometry and C_{3v} molecular symmetry. According to gas electron diffraction, the phosphorus–sulfur bond length is 1.895 Å and the phosphorus–bromine bond length is 2.193 Å, while the S=P−Br bond angle is 116.2° and the Br−P−Br bond angle is 101.9°.

Thiophosphoryl bromide is soluble in carbon disulfide, chloroform and diethyl ether.

== Reactions ==
Like other phosphoryl and thiophosphoryl halides, thiophosphoryl bromide readily hydrolyses, undergoes nucleophilic substitution and forms adducts with Lewis acids. Reaction with lithium iodide generates the mixed thiophosphoryl halides PSBr_{2}I and PSBrI_{2} but not thiophosphoryl iodide, PSI_{3}. Thiophosphoryl bromide is of use in organic synthesis for reducing sulfoxides to thioethers, and sulfines to thioketones.
