= Phosphorus trifluoride (data page) =

Chemical data page

This page provides supplementary chemical data on phosphorus trifluoride.

== Structure and properties ==
Structure and properties
| Index of refraction, n_{D} | ? |
| Abbe number | ? |
| Dielectric constant, ε_{r} | ? ε_{0} at ? °C |
| Bond strength | 499 kJ/mol (P–F) |
| Bond length | 156 pm (P–F) |
| Bond angle | 96.3° (F–P–F) |
| Magnetic susceptibility | ? |

== Thermodynamic properties ==
Phase behavior
| Triple point | ? K (? °C), ? Pa |
| Critical point | 271 K (−2 °C), 42.7 atm |
| Std enthalpy change of fusion, Δ_{fus}H^{~~o~~} | ? kJ/mol |
| Std entropy change of fusion, Δ_{fus}S^{~~o~~} | ? J/(mol·K) |
| Std enthalpy change of vaporization, Δ_{vap}H^{~~o~~} | ? kJ/mol |
| Std entropy change of vaporization, Δ_{vap}S^{~~o~~} | ? J/(mol·K) |
Solid properties
| Std enthalpy change of formation, Δ_{f}H^{~~o~~}_{solid} | ? kJ/mol |
| Standard molar entropy, S^{~~o~~}_{solid} | ? J/(mol K) |
| Heat capacity, c_{p} | ? J/(mol K) |
Liquid properties
| Std enthalpy change of formation, Δ_{f}H^{~~o~~}_{liquid} | ? kJ/mol |
| Standard molar entropy, S^{~~o~~}_{liquid} | ? J/(mol K) |
| Heat capacity, c_{p} | ? J/(mol K) |
Gas properties
| Std enthalpy change of formation, Δ_{f}H^{~~o~~}_{gas} | ? kJ/mol |
| Standard molar entropy, S^{~~o~~}_{gas} | ? J/(mol K) |
| Heat capacity, c_{p} | ? J/(mol K) |

== Spectral data ==
UV-Vis
| λ_{max} | ? nm |
| Extinction coefficient, ε | ? |
IR
| Major absorption bands | ? cm^{−1} |
NMR
| Proton NMR |
| Carbon-13 NMR |
| Other NMR data |
MS
| Masses of main fragments |

This box:
- Except where noted otherwise, data relate to Standard temperature and pressure.
- Reliability of data general note.
