= Phosphonium bromide =

Names
- Other names: Phosphanium bromide

Identifiers
3D model (JSmol)	Interactive image
ChemSpider	10614161
PubChem CID	21868956
- InChI: InChI=1S/BrH.H3P/h1H;1H3 Key: PMOIAJVKYNVHQE-UHFFFAOYSA-N
- SMILES: [PH4+].[Br-]

Properties
Chemical formula	PH_{4}Br
Molar mass	114.91 g/mol
Appearance	Colorless solid
Density	2.39 g/cm^{3}
Melting point	38 °C (100 °F; 311 K) (sublimination, decomposition)
Solubility in water	Soluble, hydrolysis

Structure
Crystal structure	Tetragonal
Space group	P4/nmm
Lattice constant	a = 6.042 Å, b = 6.042 Å, c = 4.378 Å
Lattice volume (V)	159.8
Coordination geometry	Tetrahedral (at P)

Thermochemistry
Std enthalpy of formation (Δ_{f}H^{⦵}_{298})	–127.6 kJ/mol
Gibbs free energy (Δ_{f}G^{⦵})	–47.6 kJ/mol
Enthalpy of sublimation (Δ_{f}H_{sublim})	96 kJ/mol (dissociation)

Related compounds
Other anions	Phosphonium chloride Phosphonium iodide
- Except where otherwise noted, data are given for materials in their standard state (at 25 °C [77 °F], 100 kPa). Infobox references

Phosphonium bromide is an inorganic chemical compound with the formula PH_{4}Br. It is the bromine analog of the more commonly known phosphonium iodide and has the appearance of a white solid.

== Structure ==
Phosphonium bromide is isostructural with phosphonium iodide, both crystallizing in the P4/nmm space group and has a P–H bond distance of ~1.4 Å.

== Preparation and reactions ==
It precipitates out of solution when phosphine gas is passed through concentrated hydrobromic acid. Alternatively, it can be produced by the reaction of the gases at –60 °C:

PH_{3} + HBr ⇌ PH_{4}Br

Solid phosphonium bromide dissociates back to phosphine and hydrogen bromide gas, with the dissociation pressure increasing as the temperature increases. In water, it dissociates into phosphine gas and hydrobromic acid.

PH_{4}^{+} ⇌ PH_{3} + H^{+}
