= Phosphoryl chloride (data page) =

Chemical data page

This page provides supplementary chemical data on phosphoryl chloride.

== Material Safety Data Sheets ==
- Aldrich MSDS
- Fisher MSDS

== Thermodynamic properties ==
Phase behavior
Triple point	? K (? °C), ? Pa
Critical point	602 K (329 °C), ? Pa
Std enthalpy change of fusion, Δ_{fus}H^{~~o~~}	? kJ/mol
Std entropy change of fusion, Δ_{fus}S^{~~o~~}	? J/(mol·K)
Std enthalpy change of vaporization, Δ_{vap}H^{~~o~~}	+33. kJ/mol
Std entropy change of vaporization, Δ_{vap}S^{~~o~~}	? J/(mol·K)
Solid properties
Std enthalpy change of formation, Δ_{f}H^{~~o~~}_{solid}	−610.0 kJ/mol
Standard molar entropy, S^{~~o~~}_{solid}	? J/(mol K)
Heat capacity, c_{p}	? J/(mol K)
Liquid properties
Std enthalpy change of formation, Δ_{f}H^{~~o~~}_{liquid}	−597.0 kJ/mol
Standard molar entropy, S^{~~o~~}_{liquid}	? J/(mol K)
Heat capacity, c_{p}	? J/(mol K)
Gas properties
Std enthalpy change of formation, Δ_{f}H^{~~o~~}_{gas}	−592.0 kJ/mol
Std Gibbs' free energy change of formation, Δ_{f}G^{~~o~~}_{gas}	−545.2 kJ/mol
Standard molar entropy, S^{~~o~~}_{gas}	325 J/(mol K)
Heat capacity, c_{p}	? J/(mol K)

== Spectral data ==
UV-Vis
Lambda-max	? nm
Extinction coefficient	?
IR
Major absorption bands	? cm^{−1}
NMR
Phosphorus-31 NMR	2.2 ppm upfield of H_{3}PO_{4}
MS
Masses of main fragments

== Structure and properties data ==
Structure and properties
Index of refraction	1.460
Dielectric constant	13 C^{2}/(N·m^{2}) at 22 °C
Bond strength	533.5 kJ/mol (P=O)
Bond length	158 pm (P=O); 202 pm (P-Cl)
Bond angle	103° (Cl-P-Cl)

This box:
- Except where noted otherwise, data relate to Standard temperature and pressure.
- Reliability of data general note.
