= Diarsenic tetraiodide =

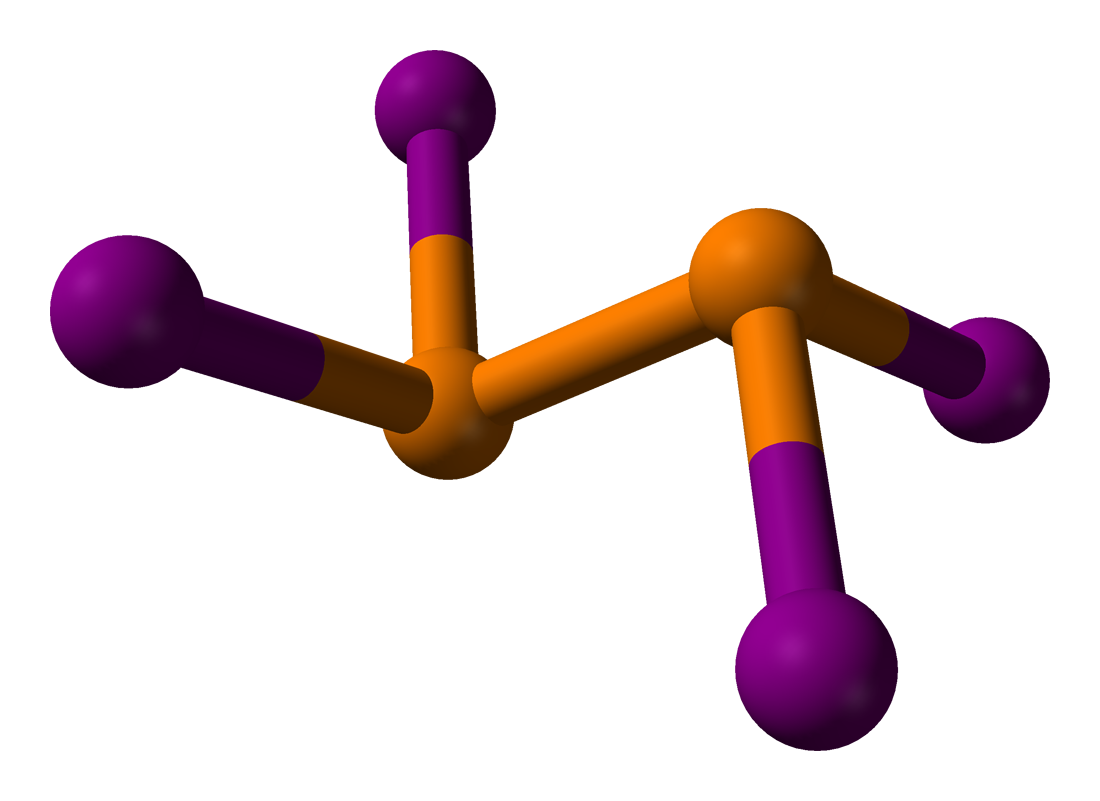

Names
- IUPAC name Arsenic diiodide

Identifiers
CAS Number	13770-56-4
3D model (JSmol)	Interactive image
PubChem CID	165365657
CompTox Dashboard (EPA)	DTXSID401045877
- InChI: InChI=1S/As.2HI/h;2*1H/p-2 Key: YWEMTIDRPOANDU-UHFFFAOYSA-L
- SMILES: I[As](I)[As](I)I

Properties
Chemical formula	As_{2}I_{4}
Molar mass	657.461 g/mol
Appearance	Red crystalline solid
Melting point	137 °C (279 °F; 410 K)
Boiling point	380 °C (716 °F; 653 K)
- Except where otherwise noted, data are given for materials in their standard state (at 25 °C [77 °F], 100 kPa). Infobox references

Diarsenic tetraiodide is an inorganic compound of arsenic and iodine. It is a dark red metastable solid. The compound is a closely related to the better characterized diphosphorus tetraiodide. Identified in the late 19th century with the (accurate) empirical formula AsI_{2}, the compound was assigned the formula (As_{2}I_{4}) several years later.
