= Thiophosphoryl iodide =

Names
- Other names: Phosphorothioic triiodide; Phosphorus thioiodide; Thiophosphoryl triiodide

Identifiers
CAS Number	63972-04-3
3D model (JSmol)	Interactive image
PubChem CID	21517233
CompTox Dashboard (EPA)	DTXSID00615471
- InChI: InChI=1S/I3PS/c1-4(2,3)5 Key: CVHICNBAVVKDQW-UHFFFAOYSA-N
- SMILES: S=P(I)(I)I

Properties
Chemical formula	PSI_{3}
Molar mass	443.75 g·mol^{−1}
Appearance	red-brown solid
Melting point	48 °C (118 °F; 321 K)
Boiling point	decomposes

Structure
Molecular shape	Tetrahedral at the P atom

Related compounds
Related compounds	Phosphorus triiodide; Phosphoryl iodide; Thiophosphoryl fluoride; Thiophosphoryl chloride; Thiophosphoryl bromide; Phosphorothioic chloride difluoride
- Except where otherwise noted, data are given for materials in their standard state (at 25 °C [77 °F], 100 kPa). Infobox references

Thiophosphoryl iodide is an inorganic compound with the formula PSI_{3}.

== Preparation ==
Thiophosphoryl iodide can be prepared by reacting phosphorus triiodide with sulfur in carbon disulfide at 10–15 °C in the dark for several days.

Attempts to synthesise PSI_{3} by the reaction of lithium iodide with thiophosphoryl bromide lead to the mixed thiophosphoryl halides PSBr_{2}I and PSBrI_{2} instead.
