= Diphosphorus tetraiodide =

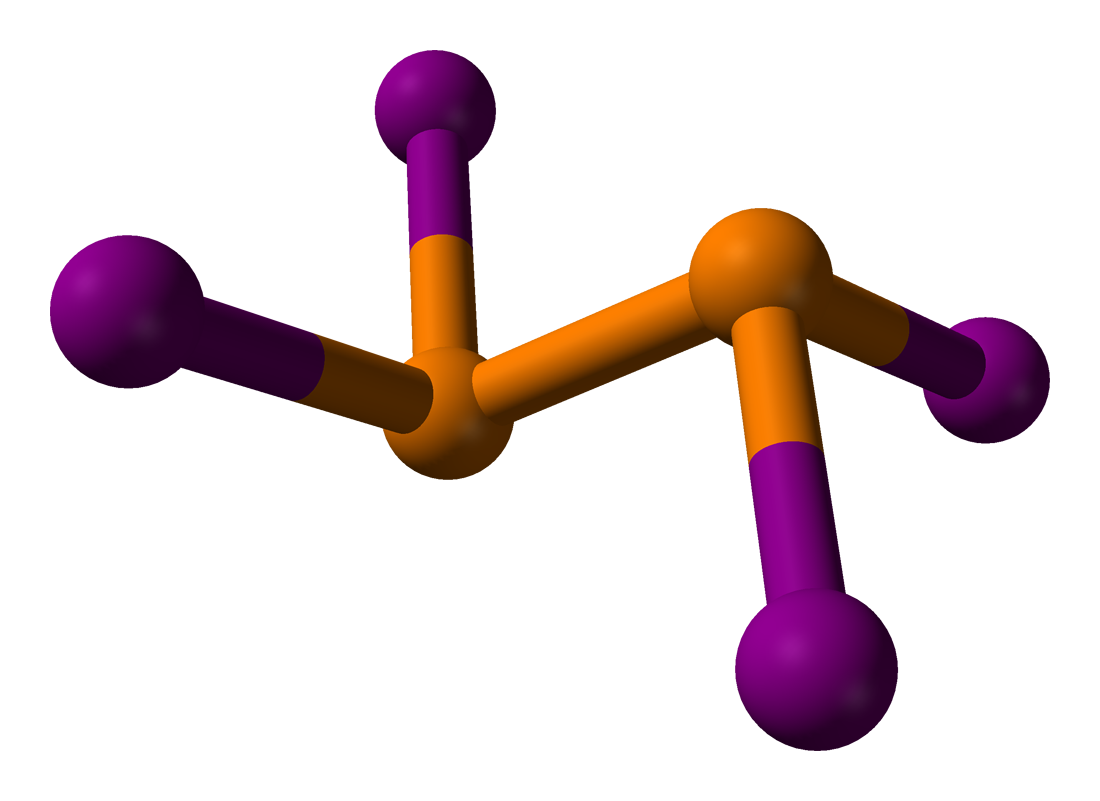
- Ball-and-stick model of the diphosphorus tetraiodide molecule

Names
- IUPAC name Diphosphorus tetraiodide
- Preferred IUPAC name Tetraiododiphosphane
- Other names Phosphorus(II) iodide

Identifiers
| CAS Number | 13455-00-0 |
| 3D model (JSmol) | Interactive image |
| ChemSpider | 75322 |
| ECHA InfoCard | 100.033.301 |
| EC Number | 236-646-7 |
| PubChem CID | 83484 |
| CompTox Dashboard (EPA) | DTXSID6065474 |
- InChI: InChI=1S/I4P2/c1-5(2)6(3)4 Key: YXXQTQYRRHHWFL-UHFFFAOYSA-N
- SMILES: P(P(I)I)(I)I

Properties
| Chemical formula | P_{2}I_{4} |
| Molar mass | 569.57 g/mol |
| Appearance | Orange crystalline solid |
| Melting point | 125.5 °C (257.9 °F; 398.6 K) |
| Boiling point | Decomposes |
| Solubility in water | Decomposes |

Hazards
- GHS labelling
| Pictograms | (GHS05: Corrosive) |
| Signal word | Danger |
| Hazard statements | H314 |
| Precautionary statements | P260, P264, P280, P301+P330+P331, P303+P361+P353, P304+P340, P305+P351+P338, P310, P321, P363, P405, P501 |
| Flash point | Non-flammable |

Related compounds
| Other anions | Diphosphorus tetrafluoride Diphosphorus tetrachloride Diphosphorus tetrabromide |
| Other cations | diarsenic tetraiodide |
| Related Binary Phosphorus halides | phosphorus triiodide |
| Related compounds | diphosphane diphosphines |
- Except where otherwise noted, data are given for materials in their standard state (at 25 °C [77 °F], 100 kPa). verify (what is ?) Infobox references

Diphosphorus tetraiodide is an orange crystalline solid with the formula P_{2}I_{4}. It has been used as a reducing agent in organic chemistry. It is a rare example of a compound with phosphorus in the +2 oxidation state, and can be classified as a subhalide of phosphorus. It is the most stable of the diphosphorus tetrahalides.

== Synthesis and structure ==
Diphosphorus tetraiodide is easily generated by the decomposition of phosphorus triiodide in dry ether:

2 PI_{3} → P_{2}I_{4} + I_{2}

It can also be obtained by treating phosphorus trichloride and potassium iodide in anhydrous conditions.

Another synthesis route involves combining phosphonium iodide with iodine in a solution of carbon disulfide. An advantage of this route is that the resulting product is virtually free of impurities.

2PH_{4}I + 5I_{2} → P_{2}I_{4} + 8HI

The compound adopts a centrosymmetric structure with a P-P bond of 2.230 Å.

== Reactions ==
=== Inorganic chemistry ===
Diphosphorus tetraiodide reacts with bromine to form mixtures PI_{3−n}Br_{n}. With sulfur, it is oxidized to P_{2}S_{2}I_{4}, retaining the P-P bond. It reacts with elemental phosphorus and water to make phosphonium iodide, which is collected via sublimation at 80 °C.

=== Organic chemistry ===
Diphosphorus tetraiodide is used in organic synthesis mainly as a deoxygenating agent. It is used for deprotecting acetals and ketals to aldehydes and ketones, and for converting epoxides into alkenes and aldoximes into nitriles. It can also cyclize 2-aminoalcohols to aziridines and to convert α,β-unsaturated carboxylic acids to α,β-unsaturated bromides.

As foreshadowed by the work of Bertholet in 1855, diphosphorus tetraiodide can convert glycols to trans alkenes. This reaction is known as the Kuhn–Winterstein reaction, after the chemists who applied it to the production of polyene chromophores.
