= Phosphonium iodide =

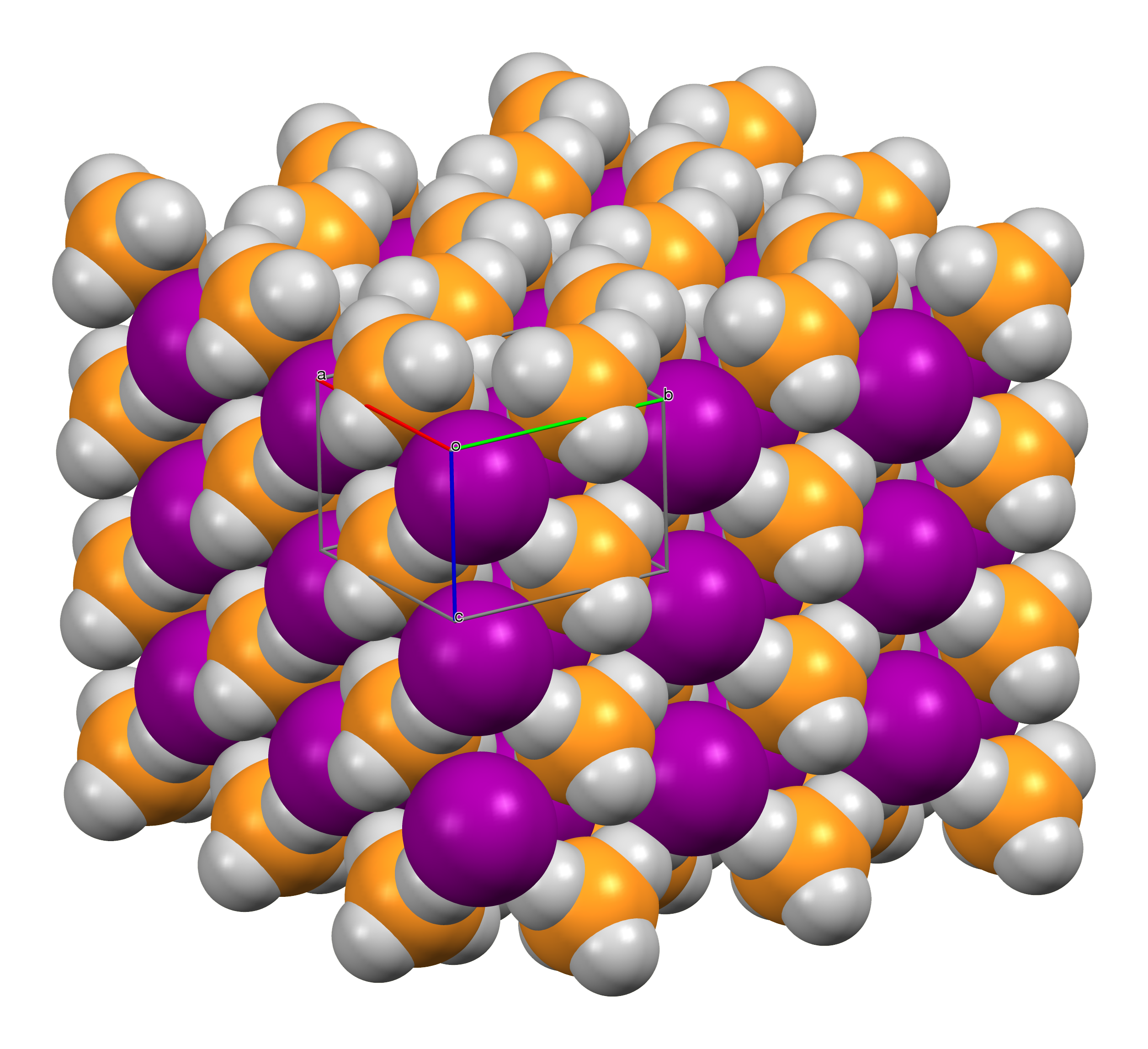
- Space-filling model of the crystal structure of phosphonium iodide

Names
- IUPAC name Phosphanium iodide
- Other names Iodine phosphide

Identifiers
CAS Number	12125-09-6
3D model (JSmol)	Interactive image
ChemSpider	145802
ECHA InfoCard	100.031.978
EC Number	235-189-0
PubChem CID	166618
UNII	70782D13AF
CompTox Dashboard (EPA)	DTXSID30923738
- InChI: InChI=1S/HI.H3P/h1H;1H3 Key: LSMAIBOZUPTNBR-UHFFFAOYSA-N
- SMILES: [PH4+].[I-]

Properties
Chemical formula	PH_{4}I
Molar mass	161.910 g/mol
Boiling point	62 °C (144 °F; 335 K) Sublimes
Solubility in water	decomposes

Structure
Crystal structure	Tetragonal (P4/nmm)
Lattice constant	a = 6.34 Å, c = 4.62 Å
Lattice volume (V)	185.7 Å^{3}
Formula units (Z)	2

Related compounds
Other anions	Phosphonium chloride Phosphonium bromide
- Except where otherwise noted, data are given for materials in their standard state (at 25 °C [77 °F], 100 kPa). Infobox references

Phosphonium iodide is a chemical compound with the formula PH_{4}I. It is an example of a salt containing an unsubstituted phosphonium cation (PH^{+}_{4}). Phosphonium iodide is commonly used as storage for phosphine and as a reagent for substituting phosphorus into organic molecules.

== Preparation ==
Phosphonium iodide is prepared by mixing diphosphorus tetraiodide (P_{2}I_{4}) with elemental phosphorus and water at 80 °C and allowing the salt to sublime.

10 P_{2}I_{4} + 13 P_{4} + 128 H_{2}O → 40 PH_{4}I + 32 H_{3}PO_{4}

== Properties ==
=== Structure ===
Its crystal structure has the tetragonal space group P4/nmm, which is a distorted version of the NH_{4}Cl crystal structure; the unit cell has approximate dimensions 634×634×462 pm. The hydrogen bonding in the system causes the PH^{+}_{4} cations to orient such that the hydrogen atoms point toward the I^{−} anions.

=== Chemical ===
At 62 °C and atmospheric pressure, phosphonium iodide sublimates and dissociates reversibly into phosphine and hydrogen iodide (HI). It oxidizes slowly in air to give iodine and phosphorus oxides; it is hygroscopic and is hydrolyzed into phosphine and HI:

PH_{4}I ⇌ PH_{3} + HI

Phosphine gas may be devolved from phosphonium iodide by mixing an aqueous solution with potassium hydroxide:

PH_{4}I + KOH → PH_{3} + KI + H_{2}O

It reacts with elemental iodine and bromine in a nonpolar solution to give phosphorus halides; for example:

2PH_{4}I + 5I_{2} → P_{2}I_{4} + 8HI

Phosphonium iodide is a powerful substitution reagent in organic chemistry; for example, it can convert a pyrilium into a phosphinine via substitution. In 1951, Glenn Halstead Brown found that PH_{4}I reacts with acetyl chloride to produce an unknown phosphine derivative, possibly CH_{3}C(=PH)PH_{2}·HI.
