= Diphosphorus tetrafluoride =

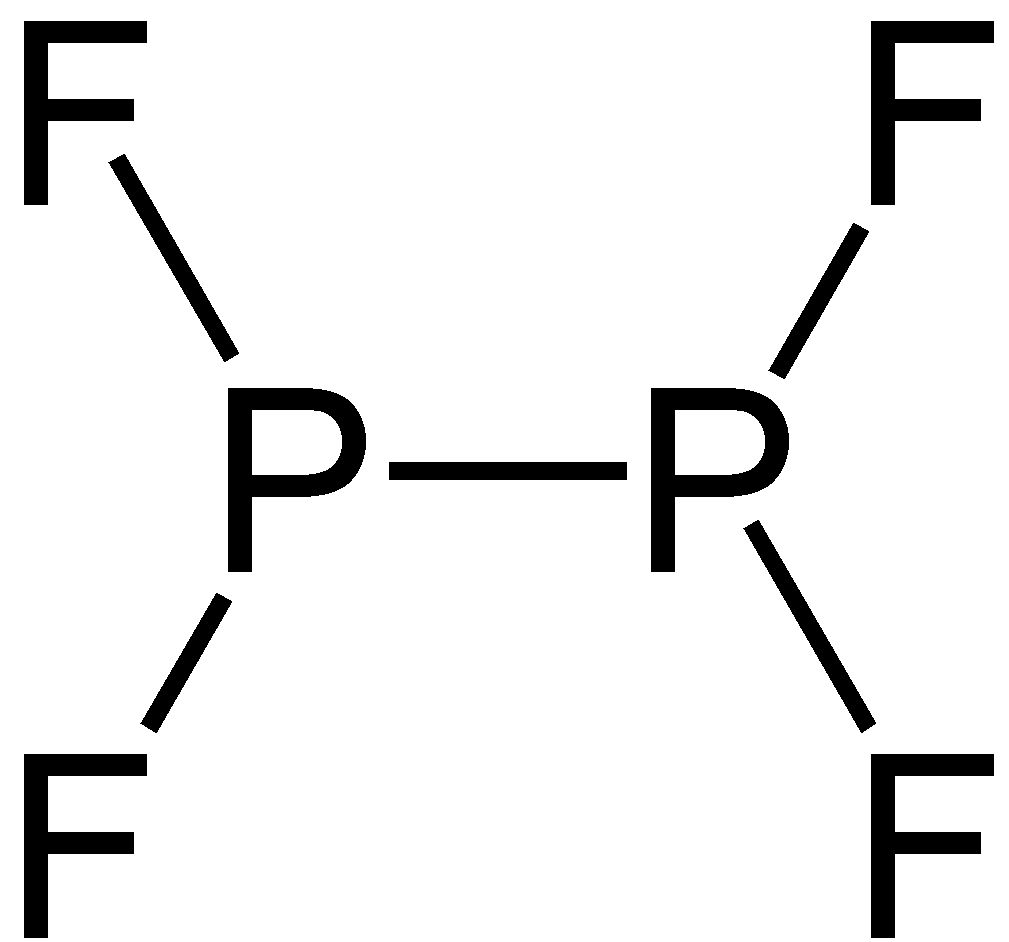

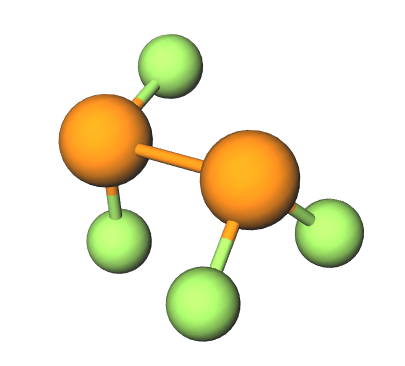

Names
- IUPAC name difluorophosphanyl(difluoro)phosphane
- Other names tetrafluorodiphosphine; phosphorus difluoride

Identifiers
CAS Number	13824-74-3
3D model (JSmol)	Interactive image
ChemSpider	123129
PubChem CID	139615
CompTox Dashboard (EPA)	DTXSID00160552
- InChI: InChI=1S/F4P2/c1-5(2)6(3)4 Key: PCIAPVMJDQUHAP-UHFFFAOYSA-N
- SMILES: FP(F)P(F)F

Properties
Chemical formula	P_{2}F_{4}
Melting point	−86.5 °C (−123.7 °F; 186.7 K)
Boiling point	−6.2 °C (20.8 °F; 266.9 K)

Related compounds
Other anions	Diphosphorus tetrachloride Diphosphorus tetrabromide Diphosphorus tetraiodide
Other cations	dinitrogen tetrafluoride diarsenic tetrafluoride
Related Binary Phosphorus halides	phosphorus trifluoride phosphorus pentafluoride
Related compounds	diphosphane diphosphines
- Except where otherwise noted, data are given for materials in their standard state (at 25 °C [77 °F], 100 kPa). Infobox references

Diphosphorus tetrafluoride is a gaseous compound of phosphorus and fluorine with formula P_{2}F_{4}. Two fluorine atoms are connected to each phosphorus atom, and there is a bond between the two phosphorus atoms. Phosphorus can be considered to have oxidation state +2, as indicated by the name phosphorus difluoride.

== Production ==
Diphosphorus tetrafluoride was discovered in 1966 by Max Lustig, John K. Ruff and Charles B. Colburn at the Redstone Research Laboratories. The initial synthesis reacted phosphorus iododifluoride with mercury at room temperature:

2 PF_{2}I + 2 Hg → P_{2}F_{4} + Hg_{2}I_{2}

== Properties ==
The P−P bond in diphosphorus tetrafluoride is much stronger than the corresponding N−N bond in dinitrogen tetrafluoride which easily breaks into nitrogen difluoride. The infrared spectrum has absorption at 842 cm^{−1}, 830 cm^{−1}, 820 cm^{−1}, and weaker at 408 cm^{−1} and 356 cm^{−1}. The molecule has C_{2h} symmetry.

== Reactions ==
Under ultraviolet light diphosphorus tetrafluoride reacts with alkynes connected to trifluoromethyl groups to add difluorophosphino (-PF_{2}) groups on each side of a double bond. Other kinds of alkynes produced polymers with this treatment. With alkenes, similarly bis(difluorophosphino) is added across the double bond.

Diphosphorus tetrafluoride reacts with diborane to yield another gas P_{2}F_{4}·BH_{3} which does not condense above −85°C. This decomposes to yet another gas PF_{3}·BH_{3} and a polymer with formula PF.

Diphosphorus tetrafluoride reacts with oxygen or water to yield diphosphorus tetrafluoride oxide, which has one oxygen atom inserted between the two phosphorus atoms:

2 P_{2}F_{4} + H_{2}O → 2 PHF_{2} + F_{2}POPF_{2}

The latter compound is a gas with boiling point around −18 °C.
