= Diphosphorus tetrachloride =

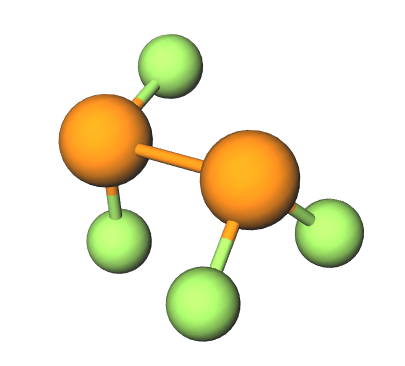

Identifiers
CAS Number	13497-91-1
3D model (JSmol)	Interactive image
ChemSpider	123003
PubChem CID	139480
CompTox Dashboard (EPA)	DTXSID10159174
- InChI: InChI=1S/Cl4P2/c1-5(2)6(3)4 Key: SWRNIYAQKATHDJ-UHFFFAOYSA-N
- SMILES: P(P(Cl)Cl)(Cl)Cl

Properties
Chemical formula	P_{2}Cl_{4}
Appearance	colorless liquid
Melting point	−28 °C; −19 °F; 245 K
Boiling point	180 °C; 356 °F; 453 K

Related compounds
Other anions	Diphosphorus tetrafluoride Diphosphorus tetraiodide
Related compounds	Diphosphorus tetrafluoride Diphosphorus tetraiodide
- Except where otherwise noted, data are given for materials in their standard state (at 25 °C [77 °F], 100 kPa). Infobox references

Diphosphorus tetrachloride is an inorganic compound with a chemical formula P_{2}Cl_{4}. It is a colorless liquid that decomposes near room temperature and ignites in air.

== Production ==
It was first prepared in 1910 by Gauthier by the following reaction:

2 PCl_{3} + H_{2} → P_{2}Cl_{4} + 2 HCl

An improved method involves coevaporation of phosphorus trichloride and copper, as described by the following:

2 PCl_{3} + 2 Cu → P_{2}Cl_{4} + 2 CuCl

== Reactions ==
Near room temperature, the compound degrades to give phosphorus trichloride and an ill-defined phosphorus monochloride:

P_{2}Cl_{4} → PCl_{3} + 1/n [PCl]n

The compound adds to cyclohexene to give trans-C_{6}H_{10}-1,2-(PCl_{2})_{2}.
