= Phosphoryl bromide =

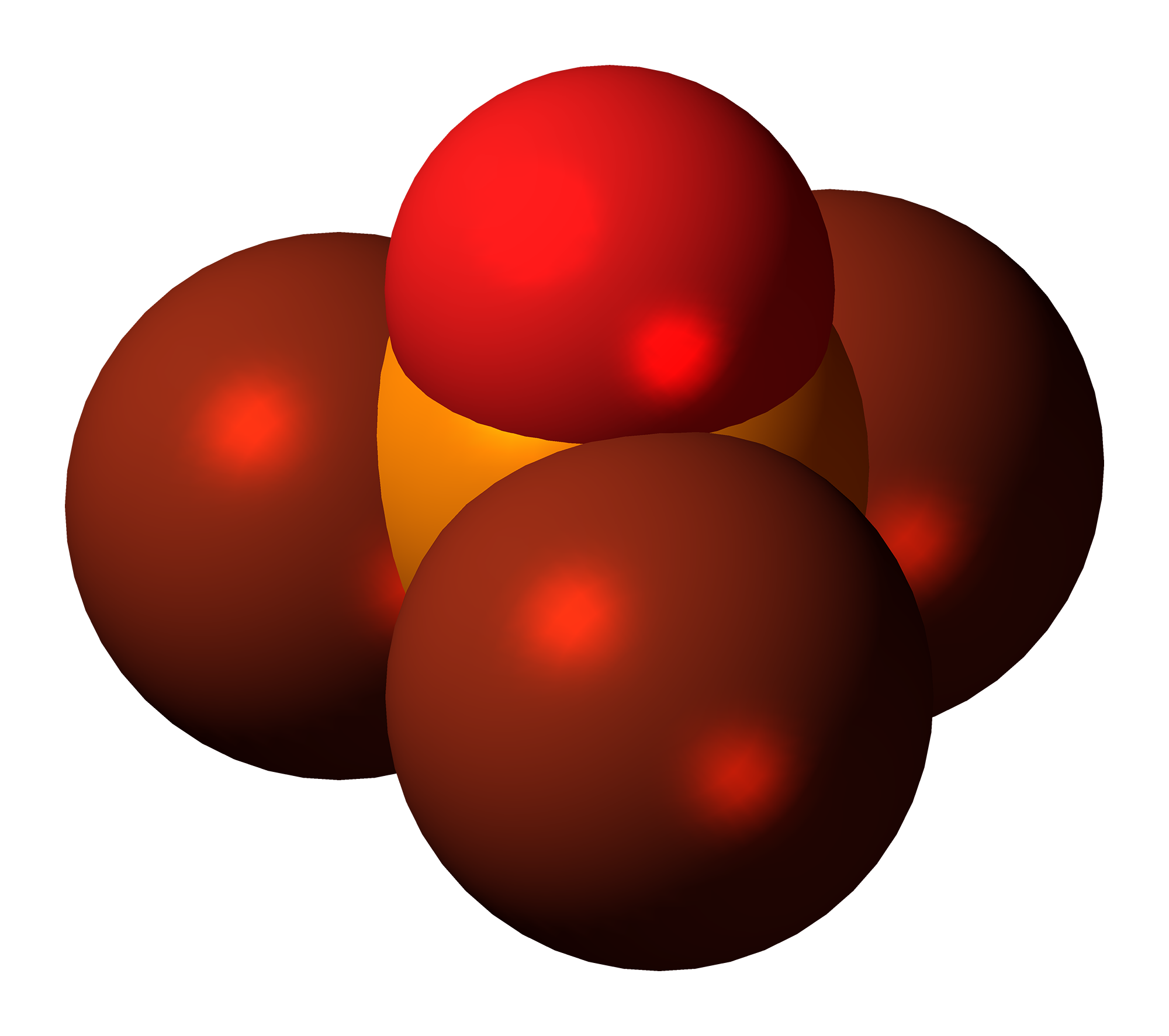

Names
- Other names Phosphorus oxybromide

Identifiers
CAS Number	7789-59-5
3D model (JSmol)	Interactive image
ChemSpider	23015
ECHA InfoCard	100.029.252
EC Number	232-177-7
PubChem CID	24613
UNII	H98H8Y87QQ
UN number	1939 2576
CompTox Dashboard (EPA)	DTXSID2064868
- InChI: InChI=1S/Br3OP/c1-5(2,3)4 Key: UXCDUFKZSUBXGM-UHFFFAOYSA-N; InChI=1/Br3OP/c1-5(2,3)4 Key: UXCDUFKZSUBXGM-UHFFFAOYAH
- SMILES: O=P(Br)(Br)Br

Properties
Chemical formula	POBr_{3}
Molar mass	286.685 g·mol^{−1}
Appearance	Colorless crystals or thin plates with a faint orange tint
Odor	Pungent
Density	2.822 g/cm^{3}
Melting point	56 °C (133 °F; 329 K)
Boiling point	192 °C (378 °F; 465 K)
Solubility in water	Reacts violently with water
Solubility	Soluble in diethyl ether, benzene, chloroform, carbon disulfide, and concentrated sulfuric acid

Structure
Space group	Pnma, No. 62
Lattice constant	a = 9.467 Å, b = 9.938 Å, c = 6.192 Å
Formula units (Z)	4
Molecular shape	Tetrahedral at the P atom

Hazards
- Occupational safety and health (OHS/OSH)
Main hazards	Corrosive to tissue
- GHS labelling
Pictograms	(GHS05: Corrosive) (GHS07: Exclamation mark)
Signal word	Danger
Hazard statements	H290, H314, H335
Precautionary statements	P234, P260, P264, P271, P280, P301+P330+P331, P303+P361+P353, P304+P340, P305+P351+P338, P310, P312, P321, P363, P390, P403+P233, P404, P405, P501

Related compounds
Related compounds	Phosphorus tribromide; Thiophosphoryl bromide; Phosphoryl fluoride; Phosphoryl chloride
- Except where otherwise noted, data are given for materials in their standard state (at 25 °C [77 °F], 100 kPa). Infobox references

Phosphoryl bromide, also known as phosphorus oxybromide, is an inorganic compound with the formula POBr_{3}.

== Preparation ==
Phosphoryl bromide is prepared by the reaction between phosphorus pentabromide and phosphorus pentoxide:

3 PBr_{5} + P_{2}O_{5} → 5 POBr_{3}

It can also be prepared via the slow addition of liquid bromine to phosphorus tribromide at 0 °C, followed by the slow addition of water and vacuum distillation of the resulting slurry.

== Structure and properties ==
Phosphoryl bromide forms colorless crystals or thin plates with a faint orange tint. Its crystals belong to the orthorhombic space group Pnma, with intermolecular Br–O bridges creating infinite chains within the structure. The intermolecular bonding causes distortions from the C_{3v} symmetry found in the free molecule.

It is stored in sealed glass ampoules.

== Uses ==
Phosphoryl bromide finds use as a specialist brominating agent.

== Safety ==
Phosphoryl bromide reacts violently with water evolving heat, forming phosphoric acid and hydrobromic acid. Reacts with organic compounds to cause fire. Evolves highly toxic and corrosive gases when exposed to fire. When heated to decomposition, it emits highly toxic fumes like bromides, oxybromides and oxides of phosphorus. It is corrosive to metals and tissues.
