= Pyrophosphoryl chloride =

Names
- Other names Diphosphoryl tetrachloride

Identifiers
CAS Number	13498-14-1
3D model (JSmol)	Interactive image
ChemSpider	3632294
ECHA InfoCard	100.033.462
EC Number	236-824-4
PubChem CID	4432411
CompTox Dashboard (EPA)	DTXSID10159179
- InChI: InChI=1S/Cl4O3P2/c1-8(2,5)7-9(3,4)6 Key: CNTIXUGILVWVHR-UHFFFAOYSA-N
- SMILES: O=P(OP(=O)(Cl)Cl)(Cl)Cl

Properties
Chemical formula	O(POCl_{2})_{2}
Molar mass	251.74 g·mol^{−1}
Appearance	colorless liquid
Density	1.74 g/cm^{3}
Boiling point	66–68 °C (151–154 °F; 339–341 K) 0.01 Torr

Hazards
- GHS labelling
Pictograms	(GHS05: Corrosive)
Signal word	Danger
Hazard statements	H314
Precautionary statements	P260, P264, P280, P301+P330+P331, P302+P361+P354, P304+P340, P305+P354+P338, P316, P321, P363, P405, P501
- Except where otherwise noted, data are given for materials in their standard state (at 25 °C [77 °F], 100 kPa). Infobox references

Pyrophosphoryl chloride is the inorganic compound with the formula P_{2}O_{3}Cl_{4}. Its structure is O(POCl_{2})_{2}. It is a colorless syrup. In terms of its chemical structure, the compound consists of two tetrahedral phosphorus sites that share an oxo bridge. The name implies that the compound is a derivative of pyrophosphoric acid, O(PO(OH)_{2})_{2}.

The compound is obtained by treating phosphoryl chloride with half an equivalent of methanol, as described in the following chemical equation:

2 POCl_{3} + CH_{3}OH → O(POCl_{2})_{2} + CH_{3}Cl + HCl

Pyrophosphoryl chloride is proposed as an intermediate in the chlorination of alcohols by phosphoryl chloride. It is also a reagent for Vilsmeier-Haack formylations.
