= Thiophosphoryl chloride =

- Structural formula of thiophosphoryl chloride

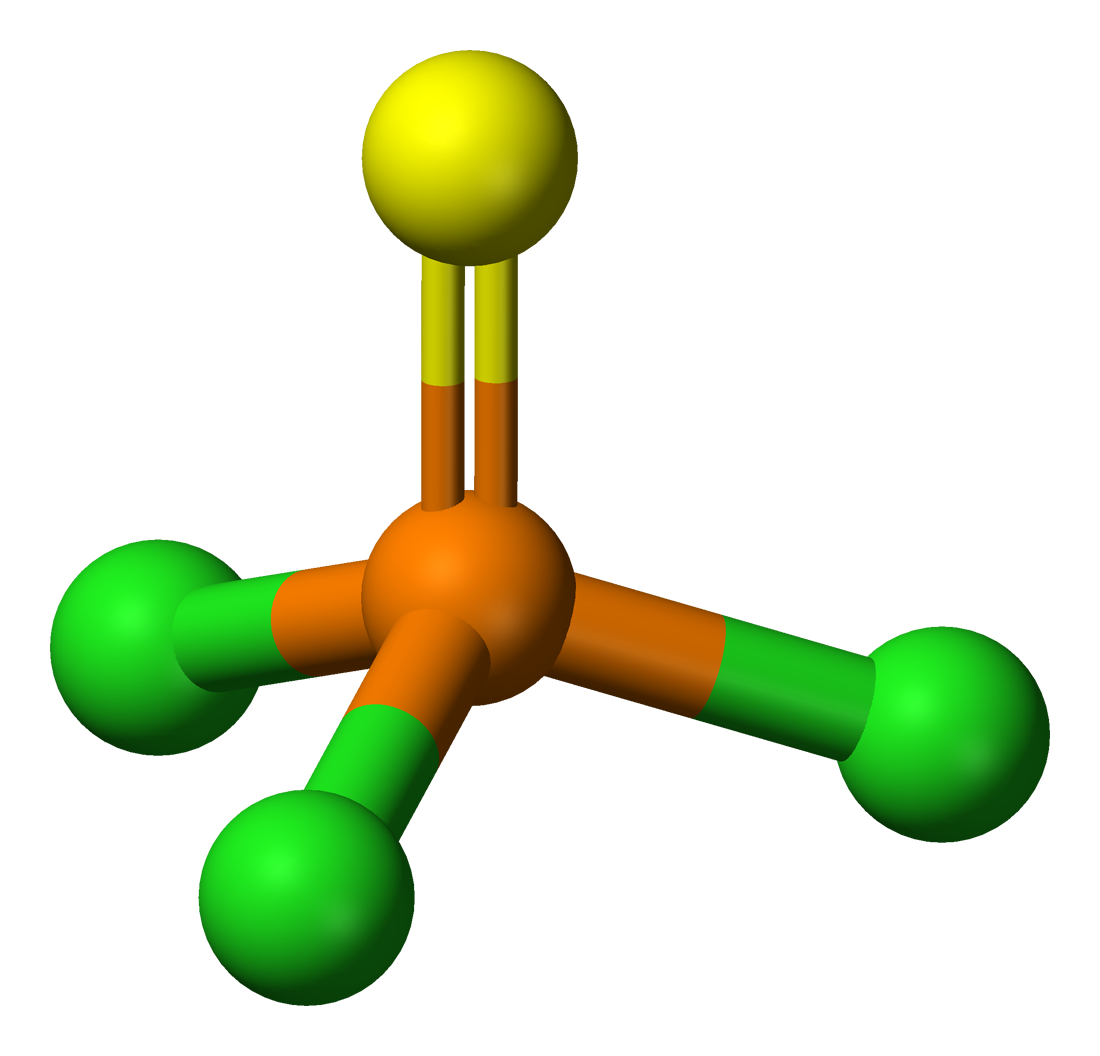
Ball-and-stick model of thiophosphoryl chloride
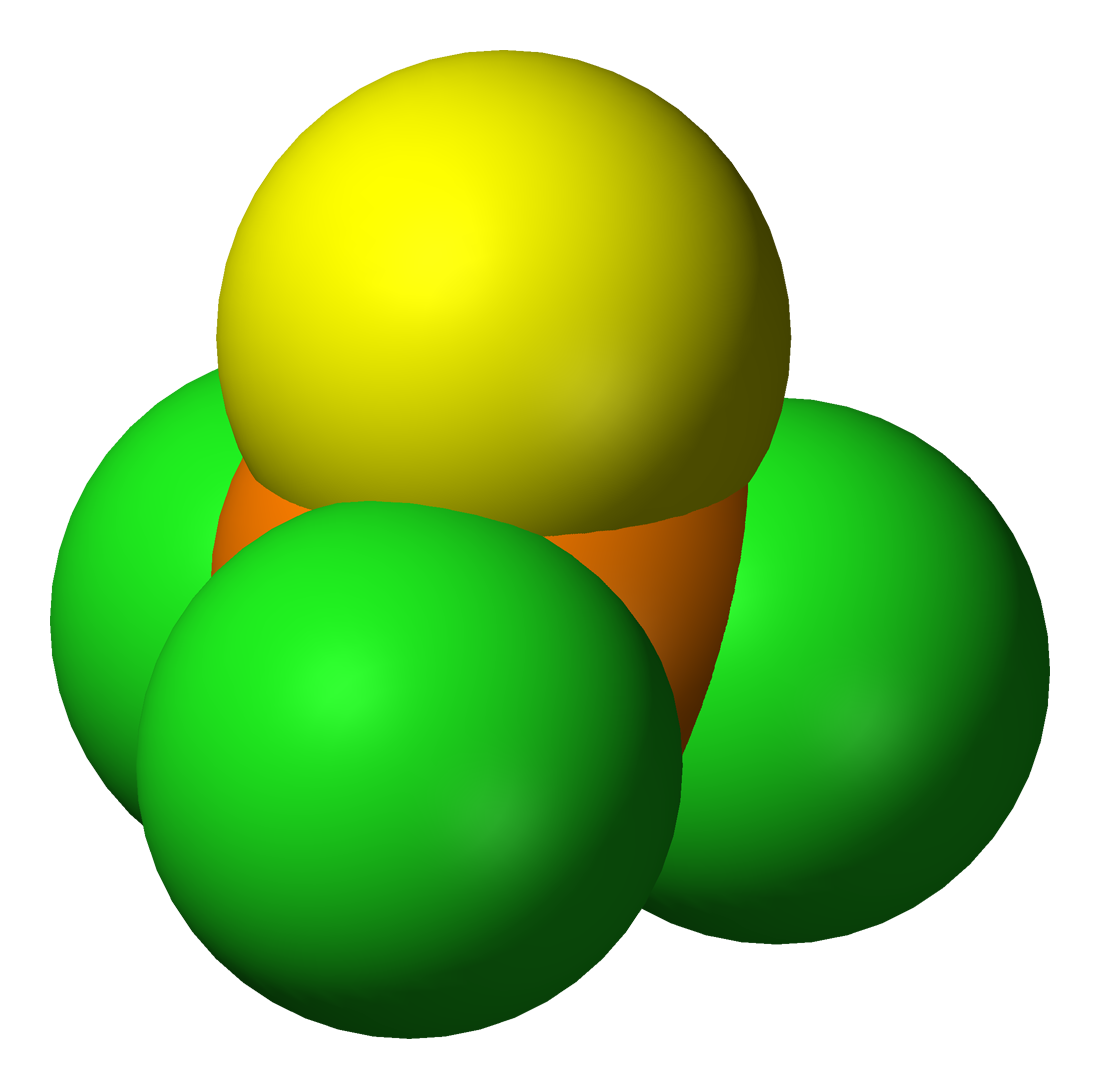
Space-filling model of thiophosphoryl chloride

Names
- IUPAC name Phosphorothioic trichloride
- Other names: Phosphoric sulfochloride (1:3); Phosphorus(V) sulfochloride; Thiophosphoryl chloride

Identifiers
CAS Number	3982-91-0
3D model (JSmol)	Interactive image
ChemSpider	18729
ECHA InfoCard	100.021.476
EC Number	223-622-6
PubChem CID	19883
RTECS number	XN2930000
UNII	II99F8594N
UN number	1837
CompTox Dashboard (EPA)	DTXSID3063253
- InChI: InChI=1S/Cl3PS/c1-4(2,3)5 Key: WQYSXVGEZYESBR-UHFFFAOYSA-N; InChI=1/Cl3PS/c1-4(2,3)5 Key: WQYSXVGEZYESBR-UHFFFAOYAE
- SMILES: P(=S)(Cl)(Cl)Cl

Properties
Chemical formula	PSCl_{3}
Molar mass	169.38 g·mol^{−1}
Appearance	Colorless liquid
Density	1.67 g/cm^{3}
Melting point	−35 °C (−31 °F; 238 K)
Boiling point	125 °C (257 °F; 398 K)
Solubility in water	Reacts
Solubility	Soluble in benzene, chloroform, CS_{2} and CCl_{4}.

Structure
Molecular shape	Tetrahedral at the P atom

Hazards
- Occupational safety and health (OHS/OSH)
Main hazards	Violent hydrolysis; releasing HCl on contact with water, maybe corrosive to metals and skin
- GHS labelling
Pictograms	(GHS05: Corrosive) (GHS06: Toxic) (GHS07: Exclamation mark)
Signal word	Danger
Hazard statements	H302, H314, H330
Precautionary statements	P260, P264, P270, P271, P280, P284, P301+P317, P301+P330+P331, P302+P361+P354, P304+P340, P305+P354+P338, P316, P320, P321, P330, P363, P403+P233, P405, P501
Flash point	none

Related compounds
Related compounds	Phosphoryl chloride; Thiophosphoryl fluoride; Thiophosphoryl bromide; Thiophosphoryl iodide; Phosphorothioic chloride difluoride
- Except where otherwise noted, data are given for materials in their standard state (at 25 °C [77 °F], 100 kPa). verify (what is ?) Infobox references

Thiophosphoryl chloride is an inorganic compound with the chemical formula PSCl_{3}. It is a colorless pungent smelling liquid that fumes in air. It is synthesized from phosphorus chloride and used to thiophosphorylate organic compounds, such as to produce insecticides.

== Synthesis ==
Thiophosphoryl chloride can be generated by several reactions starting from phosphorus trichloride. The most common and practical synthesis, hence used in industrial manufacturing, is directly reacting phosphorus trichloride with excess sulfur at 180 °C.

PCl_{3} + S → PSCl_{3}

Using this method, yields can be very high after purification by distillation. Catalysts facilitate the reaction at lower temperatures, but are not usually necessary. Alternatively, it is obtained by combining phosphorus pentasulfide and phosphorus pentachloride.

3 PCl_{5} + P_{2}S_{5} → 5 PSCl_{3}

== Structure ==
Thiophosphoryl chloride has tetrahedral molecular geometry and C_{3v} molecular symmetry, with the structure S=PCl_{3}. According to gas electron diffraction, the phosphorus–sulfur bond length is 189 pm and the phosphorus–chlorine bond length is 201 pm, while the Cl−P−Cl bond angle is 102°.

== Reactions ==
PSCl_{3} is soluble in benzene, carbon tetrachloride, chloroform, and carbon disulfide. However, it hydrolyzes rapidly in basic or hydroxylic solutions, such as alcohols and amines, to produce thiophosphates. In water PSCl_{3} reacts, and contingent on the reaction conditions, produces either phosphoric acid, hydrogen sulfide, and hydrochloric acid or dichlorothiophosphoric acid and hydrochloric acid.

PSCl_{3} + 4 H_{2}O → H_{3}PO_{4} + H_{2}S + 3 HCl
PSCl_{3} + H_{2}O → HO−P(=S)Cl_{2} + HCl

An intermediate in this process appears to be tetraphosphorus nonasulfide.

PSCl_{3} is used to thiophosphorylate organic compounds (to add thiophosphoryl group, P=S, with three free valences at the P atom, to organic compounds). This conversion is widely applicable for amines and alcohols, as well as aminoalcohols, diols, and diamines. Industrially, PSCl_{3} is used to produce insecticides, like parathion.

PSCl_{3} + 2 CH_{3}CH_{2}OH → (CH_{3}CH_{2}−O−)_{2}P(=S)−Cl + 2 HCl
(CH_{3}CH_{2}−O−)_{2}P(=S)−Cl + Na^{+}[^{−}O−C_{6}H_{4}−NO_{2}] → (CH_{3}CH_{2}−O−)_{2}P(=S)−O−C_{6}H_{4}−NO_{2} + NaCl

PSCl_{3} reacts with tertiary amides to generate thioamides. For example:

C_{6}H_{5}−C(=O)−N(−CH_{3})_{2} + PSCl_{3} → C_{6}H_{5}−C(=S)−N(−CH_{3})_{2} + POCl_{3}

When treated with methylmagnesium iodide, it give tetramethyldiphosphine disulfide (H_{3}C−)_{2}P(=S)−P(=S)(−CH_{3})_{2}.
