= Thiophosphoryl fluoride =

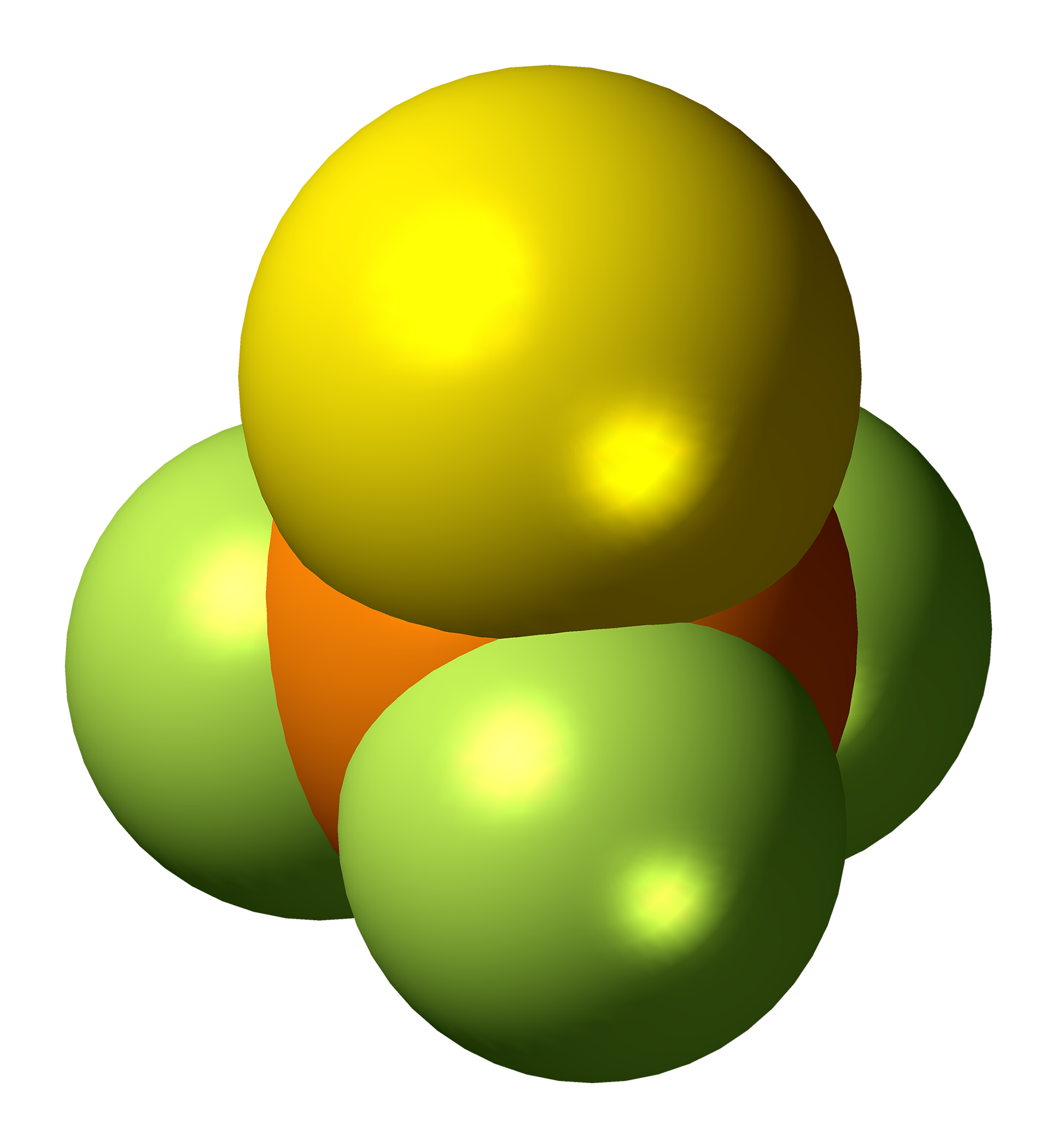

Names
- IUPAC name Trifluoro(sulfanylidene)-λ^{5}-phosphane
- Other names: Phosphorothioc trifluoride; Phosphorothioic trifluoride; Phosphorus fluoride sulfide; Phosphorus sulfurtrifluoride; Phosphorus thiofluoride; Thiophosphoryl trifluoride; Trifluorophosphine sulfide; Trifluoro-λ^{5}-phosphanethione

Identifiers
CAS Number	2404-52-6
3D model (JSmol)	: Interactive image
ChemSpider	121246
PubChem CID	137585
CompTox Dashboard (EPA)	DTXSID50178783
- InChI: InChI=1S/F3PS/c1-4(2,3)5 Key: LHGOOQAICOQNRG-UHFFFAOYSA-N
- SMILES: : FP(F)(F)=S

Properties
Chemical formula	PSF_{3}
Molar mass	120.035 g/mol
Appearance	Colorless gas or liquid
Density	1.56g/cm^{3} liquid 4.906 g/L as gas
Melting point	−148.8 °C (−235.8 °F; 124.3 K)
Boiling point	−52.25 °C (−62.05 °F; 220.90 K)
Solubility in water	slight, Highly reactive

Structure
Molecular shape	Tetrahedral at the P atom

Hazards
- Occupational safety and health (OHS/OSH)
Main hazards	Spontaneously flammable in air; toxic fumes
Flash point	very low

Related compounds
Related compounds	Phosphoryl trifluoride; Phosphorus trifluoride; Thiazyl trifluoride; Selenophosphoryl fluoride PSeF_{3}; Thiophosphoryl chloride; Phosphorothioc chloride difluoride
- Except where otherwise noted, data are given for materials in their standard state (at 25 °C [77 °F], 100 kPa). Infobox references

Thiophosphoryl fluoride is an inorganic molecular gas with formula PSF_{3} containing phosphorus, sulfur and fluorine. It spontaneously ignites in air and burns with a cool flame. The discoverers were able to have flames around their hands without discomfort, and called it "probably one of the coldest flames known". The gas was discovered in 1888.

It is useless for chemical warfare as it burns immediately and is not toxic enough.

== Preparation ==
Thiophosphoryl fluoride was discovered and named by J. W. Rodger and T. E. Thorpe in 1888.

They prepared it by heating arsenic trifluoride and thiophosphoryl chloride together in a sealed glass tube to 150 °C. Also produced in this reaction was silicon tetrafluoride and phosphorus fluorides. By increasing the PSCl_{3} the proportion of PSF_{3} was increased. They observed the spontaneous inflammability. They also used this method:

3 PbF_{2} + P_{2}S_{5} → 3 PbS + 2 PSF_{3}

at 170 °C, and also substituting a mixture of red phosphorus and sulfur, and substituting bismuth trifluoride.

Another way to prepare PSF_{3} is to add fluoride to PSCl_{3} using sodium fluoride in acetonitrile.

A high yield reaction can be used to produce the gas:

P_{4}S_{10} + 12 HF → 6 H_{2}S + 4 PSF_{3}

Under high pressure phosphorus trifluoride can react with hydrogen sulfide to yield:

PF_{3} + H_{2}S → PSF_{3} + H_{2} (1350 bar at 200 °C)

Another high pressure production uses phosphorus trifluoride with sulfur.

== Reactions ==
PSF_{3} is unstable against moisture or heat. The pure gas is completely absorbed by alkali solutions, producing the fluoride and a thiophosphate (PSO^{3−}_{3}), but stable against CaO. The latter can be used to remove SiF_{4} or PF_{3} impurities.

=== Hydrolysis and decomposition ===
Reaction with neutral water is slow:

PSF_{3} + 4 H_{2}O → H_{2}S + H_{3}PO_{4} + 3 HF

Nevertheless, dissociation constants for related acids suggest that the phosphorus atom is at least as electrophilic as in phosphoryl fluoride.

Autodecomposition from heat gives phosphorus fluorides, sulfur, and phosphorus:

PSF_{3} → S + PF_{3} → ...

Hot PSF_{3} reacts with glass, producing SF_{4}, sulfur and elemental phosphorus. If water is present and the glass is leaded, then the hydrofluoric acid and hydrogen sulfide combination produces a black plumbous sulfide deposit on the inner surface.

=== Oxidation ===
In air, PSF_{3} burns spontaneously with a greyish green flame, producing solid white fumes containing SO_{2} and P_{2}O_{5}. The flame is one of the coldest known. With dry oxygen, combustion may not be spontaneous and the flame is yellow.

Thiophosphoryl fluoride reduces oxygenated compounds to give phosphoryl fluoride and sulfur:

PSF_{3} + 3 SO_{3} → POF_{3} + 4 SO_{2}
2 PSF_{3} + SO_{2} → 2 POF_{3} + 3 S

The latter reaction also indicates why PSF_{3} is not formed from PF_{3} and SO_{2}.

Various oxidants can convert thiophosphoryl fluoride to phosphorus dichloride trifluoride, e.g.:

PSF_{3} + 2 ICl → PCl_{2}F_{3} + I_{2} + S.

=== Nucleophilic substitution ===
Thiophosphoryl difluoride isocyanate can be formed by reacting PSF_{3} with silicon tetraisocyanate at 200 °C in an autoclave.

In general, nucleophilic substitution onto thiophosphoryl fluoride is complex, because free fluoride ions tend to induce disproportionation to hexafluorophosphate and dithiodifluorophosphate (PS_{2}F^{−}_{2}). For example, with cesium fluoride:

CsF + 2 PSF_{3} → Cs[PF_{6}] + CsPS_{2}F_{2}

Thus PSF_{3} combines with dimethylamine in solution to produce dimethylaminothiophosphoryl difluoride (H_{3}C−)_{2}N−P(=S)F_{2} and difluorophosphate and hexafluorophosphate ions:

4 SPF_{3} + 4 HNMe_{2} → 2 SPF_{2}NMe_{2} + [H_{2}NMe_{2}]PF_{6} + [H_{2}NMe_{2}]S_{2}PF_{2}.

PSF_{3} reacts with four times its volume of ammonia gas producing ammonium fluoride and a mystery product, possibly P(NH_{2})_{2}SF.

=== Miscellaneous ===
PSF_{3} does not react with ether, benzene, carbon disulfide, or pure sulfuric acid. It initiates tetrahydrofuran polymerization.

PSF_{3} reacts with [SF_{6}]^{−} in a mass spectrometer to form [PSF_{4}]^{−}.

PSF_{3} + [SF_{6}]^{−•} → PSF_{4}^{−} + SF_{5}^{•}

== Related compounds ==
One fluorine can be substituted by iodine to give thiophosphoryl difluoride iodide, PSIF_{2}. PSIF_{2} can be converted to hydrothiophosphoryldifluoride, S=PHF_{2}, by reducing it with hydrogen iodide. In F_{2}P(=S)−S−PF_{2}, one sulfur forms a bridge between two phosphorus atoms.

Dimethylaminothiophosphoryl difluoride ((H_{3}C−)_{2}N−P(=S)F_{2}) is a foul smelling liquid with a boiling point of 117 °C. It has a Trouton constant (entropy of vaporization at the boiling point of the liquid) of 24.4, and a heat of evaporation of 9530 cal/mole. Alternately it can be produced by fluorination of dimethylaminothiophosphoryl dichloride ((H_{3}C−)_{2}N−P(=S)Cl_{2}).

== Physical properties ==
The thiophosphoryl trifluoride molecule shape has been determined using electron diffraction. The interatomic distances are P=S 0.187±0.003 nm, P−F 0.153±0.002 nm and bond angles of F−P−F bonding is 100.3±2°, The microwave rotational spectrum has been measured for several different isotopologues.

The critical point is at 346 K at 3.82 MPa. The liquid refractive index is 1.353.

The enthalpy of vaporisation 19.6 kJ/mol at boiling point. The enthalpy of vaporisation at other temperatures is a function of temperature T: H(T)=28.85011(346-T)^{0.38} kJ/mol.

The molecule is polar. It has a non-uniform distribution of positive and negative charge which gives it a dipole moment. When an electric field is applied more energy is stored than if the molecules did not respond by rotating. This increases the dielectric constant. The dipole moment of one molecule of thiophosphoryl trifluoride is 0.640 Debye.

The infrared spectrum includes vibrations at 275, 404, 442, 698, 951 and 983 cm^{−1}. These can be used to identify the molecule.

== See also ==
- Difluorodithiophosphate, [S_{2}PF_{2}]^{−}

== Other references ==
- Humphries, C. M.; Walsh, A. D.; Warsop, P. A. (1963). "Absorption spectrum of chlorine dioxide in the vacuum ultra-violet". Transactions of the Faraday Society. 35: 137. doi:10.1039/df9633500137.
- Montana, Anthony J.; Zumbulyadis, Nikolaos; Dailey, Benjamin P. (1976). "19F and 31P magnetic shielding anisotropies and the F–P–F bond angle of PSF3 in a smectic liquid crystal solvent". The Journal of Chemical Physics. 65 (11): 4756. Bibcode:1976JChPh..65.4756M. doi:10.1063/1.432929.
- Hawkins, Norval John (1951). The structure of PSF3 and POF3 from microwave spectroscopy.
- Chase, M. W. (1998). "Thiophosphoryl fluoride". NIST. pp. 1–1951.
- Williams, Quitman; Sheridan, John; Gordy, Walter (1952). "Microwave Spectra and Molecular Structures of POF3, PSF3, POCl3, and PSCl3". The Journal of Chemical Physics. 20 (1): 164–167. Bibcode:1952JChPh..20..164W. doi:10.1063/1.1700162.
- Lange, Willy; Askitopoulos, Konstantin (1938). "Zur Kenntnis des Phosphorsulfotrifluorids PSF3 und über ein Salz der Thiodifluorphosphorsäure H\PSF2O]". Berichte der Deutschen Chemischen Gesellschaft (A and B Series). 71 (4): 801. doi:10.1002/cber.19380710419.
- Poulenc, C. (1891). "Comptes rendus hebdomadaires des séances de l'Académie des sciences / Publiés... Par MM. Les secrétaires perpétuels". Comptes Rendus. 113: 75.
