= Phosphoryl chloride =

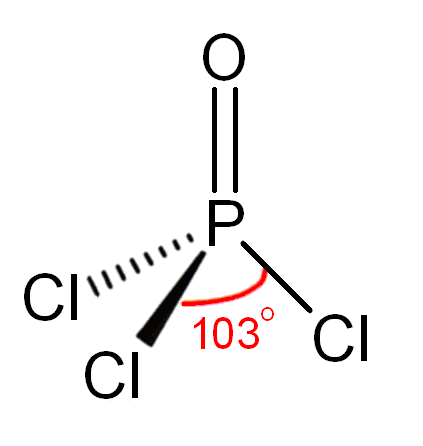
- Phosphoryl chloride

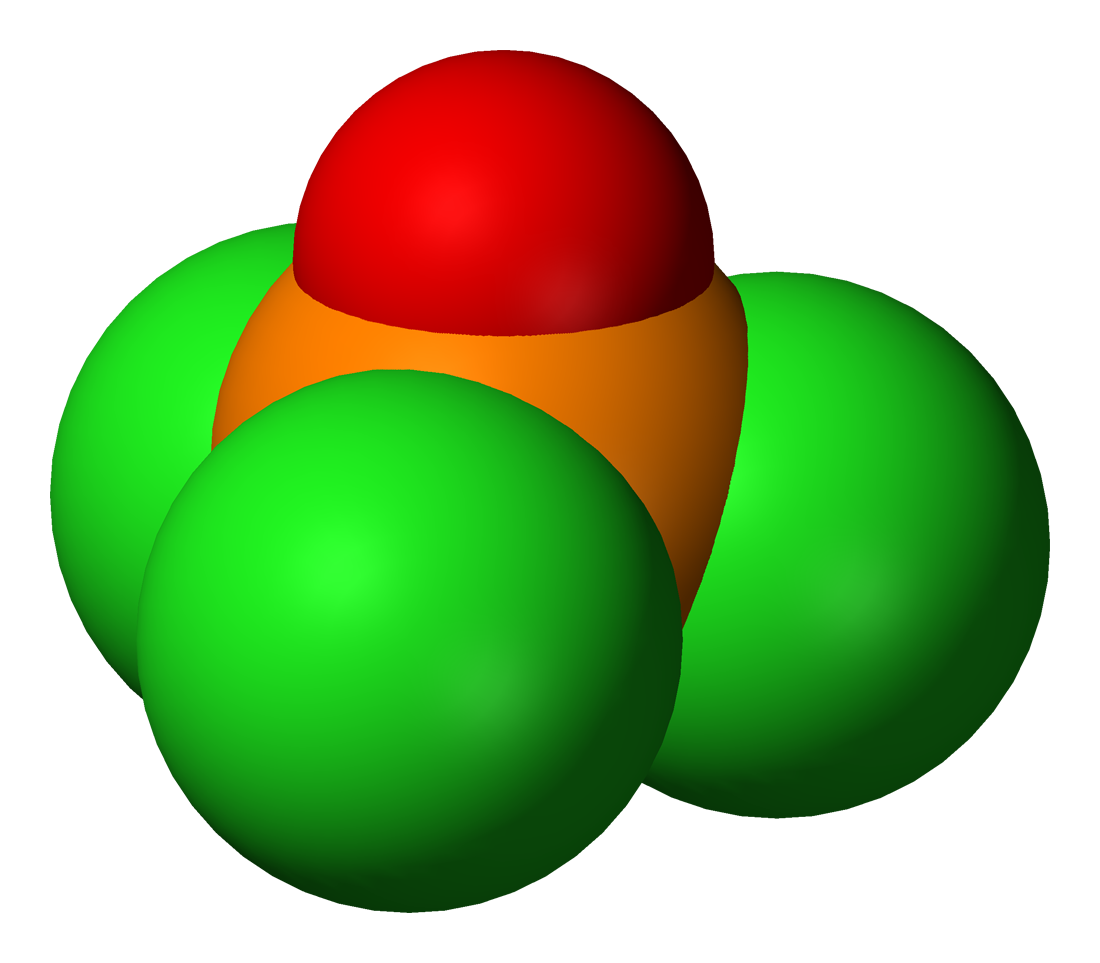

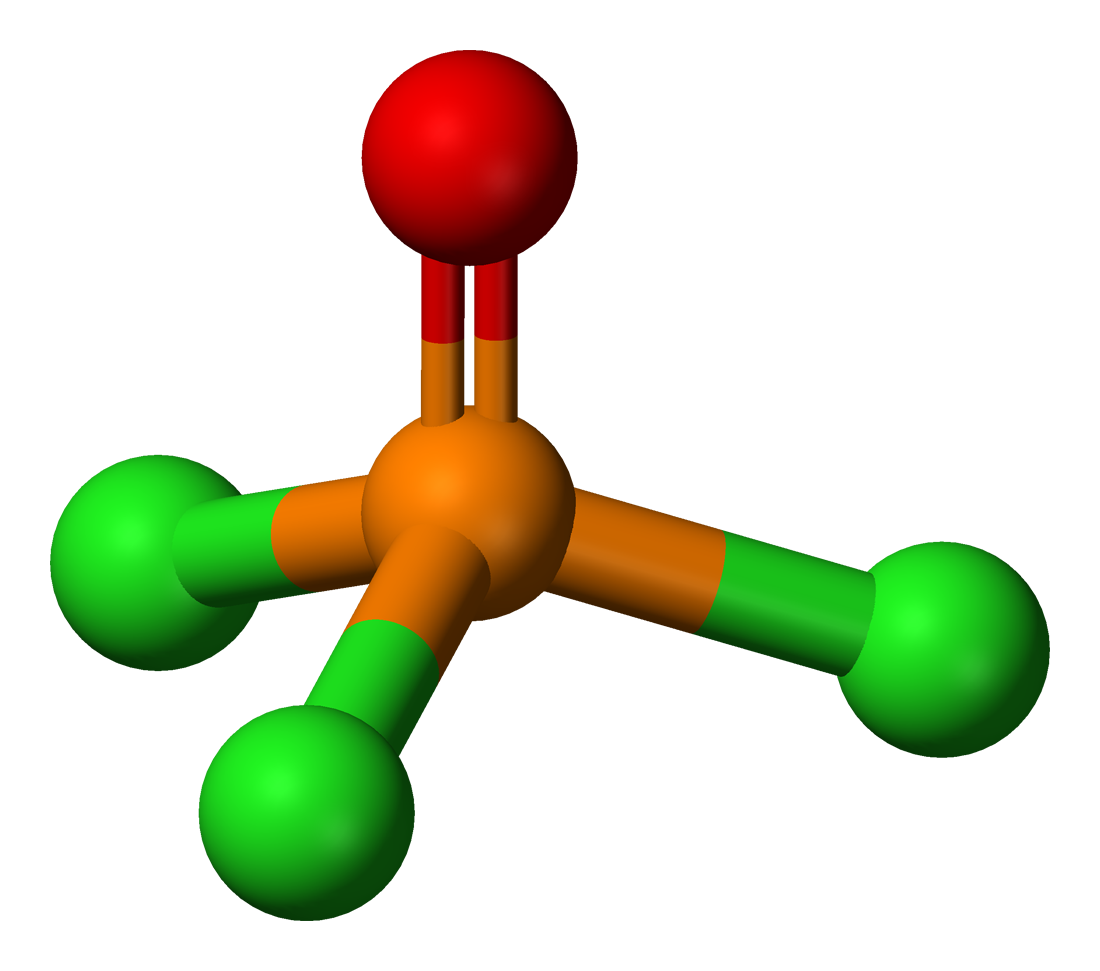

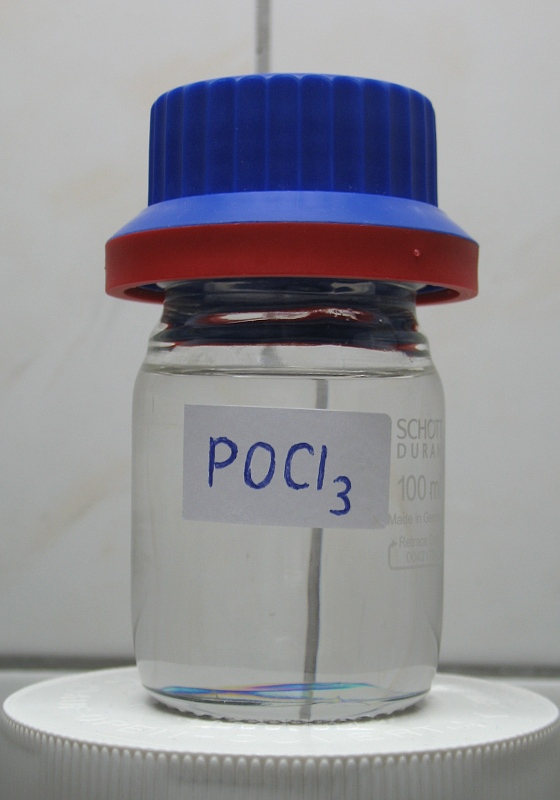

Names
- Preferred IUPAC name Phosphoryl trichloride
- Other names: Phosphorus(V) oxychloride; Phosphoric trichloride; Trichlorophosphate; Phosphorus(V) oxide trichloride

Identifiers
CAS Number	10025-87-3
3D model (JSmol)	Interactive image; Interactive image
ChEBI	CHEBI:30336
ChemSpider	23198
ECHA InfoCard	100.030.030
EC Number	233-046-7
Gmelin Reference	2272
PubChem CID	24813
RTECS number	TH4897000
UNII	9XM78OL22K
UN number	1810
CompTox Dashboard (EPA)	DTXSID5029710
- InChI: InChI=1S/Cl3OP/c1-5(2,3)4 Key: XHXFXVLFKHQFAL-UHFFFAOYSA-N; InChI=1/Cl3OP/c1-5(2,3)4 Key: XHXFXVLFKHQFAL-UHFFFAOYAS
- SMILES: O=P(Cl)(Cl)Cl; [O-][P+](Cl)(Cl)Cl

Properties
Chemical formula	POCl_{3}
Molar mass	153.32 g·mol^{−1}
Appearance	colourless liquid, fumes in moist air
Odor	pungent and musty
Density	1.645 g/cm^{3}, liquid
Melting point	1.25 °C (34.25 °F; 274.40 K)
Boiling point	105.8 °C (222.4 °F; 378.9 K)
Solubility in water	Reacts
Solubility	highly soluble in benzene, chloroform, carbon disulfide, carbon tetrachloride
Vapor pressure	40 mmHg (27 °C)
Refractive index (n_{D})	1.460

Structure
Molecular shape	Tetrahedral at the P atom
Dipole moment	2.54 D

Thermochemistry
Heat capacity (C)	138.8 J·mol^{−1}·K^{−1} (liquid), 84.9 J·mol^{−1}·K^{−1} (gas)
Std molar entropy (S^{⦵}_{298})	222.5 J·mol^{−1}·K^{−1} (liquid), 325.5 J·mol^{−1}·K^{−1} (gas)
Std enthalpy of formation (Δ_{f}H^{⦵}_{298})	−597.1 kJ·mol^{−1} (liquid), −558.5 kJ·mol^{−1} (gas)
Gibbs free energy (Δ_{f}G^{⦵})	−520.8 kJ·mol^{−1} (liquid), −512.9 kJ·mol^{−1}(gas)
Enthalpy of fusion (Δ_{f}H^{⦵}_{fus})	13.1 kJ·mol^{−1}
Enthalpy of vaporization (Δ_{f}H_{vap})	38.6 kJ·mol^{−1}

Hazards
- Occupational safety and health (OHS/OSH)
Main hazards	Toxic and corrosive; releases HCl on contact with water
- GHS labelling
Pictograms	(GHS05: Corrosive) (GHS06: Toxic) (GHS07: Exclamation mark) (GHS08: Health hazard)
Signal word	Danger
Hazard statements	H302, H314, H330, H372
Precautionary statements	P260, P264, P270, P271, P280, P284, P301+P312, P301+P330+P331, P303+P361+P353, P304+P340, P305+P351+P338, P310, P314, P320, P321, P330, P363, P403+P233, P405, P501
NFPA 704 (fire diamond)	3 0 2 W
- Lethal dose or concentration (LD, LC)
LD_{50} (median dose)	380 mg/kg (rat, oral)
- NIOSH (US health exposure limits)
PEL (Permissible)	none
REL (Recommended)	TWA 0.1 ppm (0.6 mg/m^{3}) ST 0.5 ppm (3 mg/m^{3})
IDLH (Immediate danger)	N.D.
Safety data sheet (SDS)	ICSC 0190

Related compounds
Related compounds	Thiophosphoryl chloride; Phosphorus oxybromide; Phosphorus trichloride; Phosphorus pentachloride

Supplementary data page
- Phosphoryl chloride (data page)
- Except where otherwise noted, data are given for materials in their standard state (at 25 °C [77 °F], 100 kPa). Infobox references

Phosphoryl chloride (commonly called phosphorus oxychloride) is a colourless liquid with the formula POCl_{3}. It hydrolyses in moist air releasing phosphoric acid and fumes of hydrogen chloride. It is manufactured industrially on a large scale from phosphorus trichloride and oxygen or phosphorus pentoxide. It is mainly used to make phosphate esters.

== Structure ==
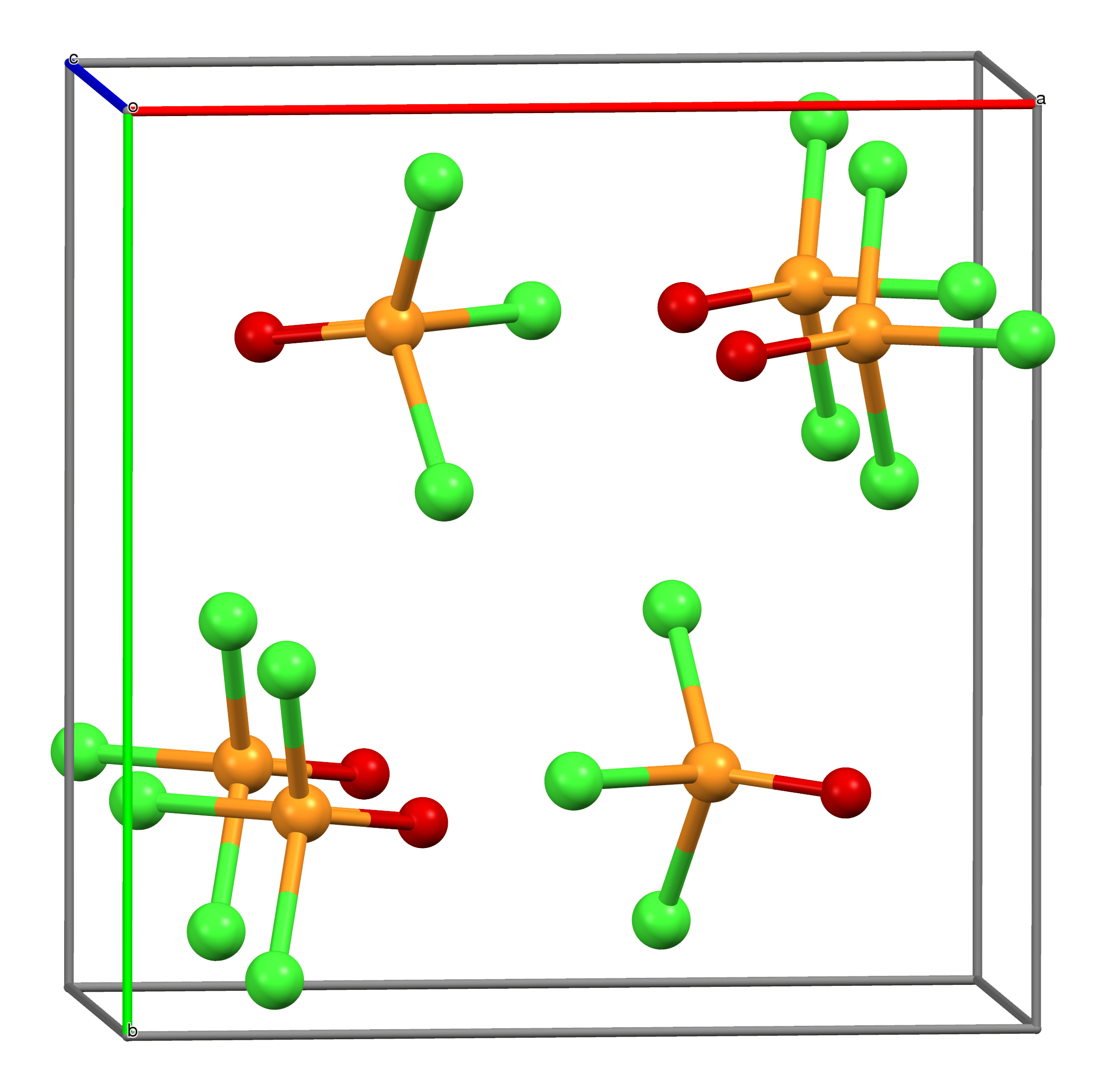
Unit cell of phosphoryl chloride.

Like phosphate, POCl_{3} is tetrahedral in shape. It features three P−Cl bonds and one strong P–O bond, with an estimated bond dissociation energy of 533.5 kJ/mol. Unlike in the case of POF_{3}, the Schomaker-Stevenson rule predicts appropriate bond length for the P–O bond only if the P–O bond is treated as a double bond, P=O. More modern treatments explain the tight P–O bond as a combination of lone pair transfer from the phosphorus to the oxygen atom and a dative π back-bond that produces an effective [P^{+}]-[O^{−}] configuration.

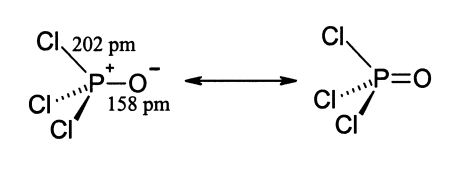

Phosphoryl chloride exists as neutral POCl_{3} molecules in the solid, liquid and gas states. This is unlike phosphorus pentachloride which exists as neutral PCl_{5} molecules in the gas and liquid states but adopts the ionic form [PCl_{4}]^{+}[PCl_{6}]^{−} (tetrachlorophosphonium hexachlorophosphate(V)) in the solid state. The average bond lengths in the crystal structure of POCl_{3} are 1.98 Å for P–Cl and 1.46 Å for P=O.

== Physical properties ==
It has a critical pressure of 3.4 atm. With a freezing point of 1 °C and boiling point of 106 °C, the liquid range of POCl_{3} is rather similar to water. Also like water, POCl_{3} autoionizes, owing to the reversible formation of [POCl_{2}]^{+} cations (dichlorooxophosphonium cations) and Cl^{−} anions.

== Chemical properties ==
POCl_{3} reacts with water to give hydrogen chloride and phosphoric acid:

O=PCl_{3} + 3 H_{2}O → O=P(OH)_{3} + 3 HCl

Intermediates in the conversion have been isolated, including pyrophosphoryl chloride, O(−P(=O)Cl_{2})_{2}.

Upon treatment with excess alcohols and phenols, POCl_{3} gives phosphate esters:

O=PCl_{3} + 3 ROH → O=P(OR)_{3} + 3 HCl

Such reactions are often performed in the presence of an HCl acceptor such as pyridine or an amine.

POCl_{3} can also act as a Lewis base, forming adducts with a variety of Lewis acids such as titanium tetrachloride:

POCl_{3} + TiCl_{4} → POCl_{3}·TiCl_{4}

The aluminium chloride adduct (POCl_{3}·AlCl_{3}) is quite stable, and so POCl_{3} can be used to remove AlCl_{3} from reaction mixtures, for example at the end of a Friedel-Crafts reaction.

POCl_{3} reacts with hydrogen bromide in the presence of Lewis-acidic catalysts to produce POBr_{3}.

== Preparation ==
Phosphoryl chloride can be prepared by many methods. Phosphoryl chloride was first reported in 1847 by the French chemist Adolphe Wurtz by reacting phosphorus pentachloride with water.

=== By oxidation ===
The commercial method involves oxidation of phosphorus trichloride with oxygen:

2 PCl_{3} + O_{2} → 2 POCl_{3}

An alternative method involves the oxidation of phosphorus trichloride with potassium chlorate:

3 PCl_{3} + KClO_{3} → 3 POCl_{3} + KCl

=== Oxygenations ===
The reaction of phosphorus pentachloride (PCl_{5}) with phosphorus pentoxide (P_{4}O_{10}).

6 PCl_{5} + P_{4}O_{10} → 10 POCl_{3}

The reaction can be simplified by chlorinating a mixture of PCl_{3} and P_{4}O_{10}, generating the PCl_{5} in situ. The reaction of phosphorus pentachloride with boric acid or oxalic acid:

3 PCl_{5} + 2 B(OH)_{3} → 3 POCl_{3} + B_{2}O_{3} + 6 HCl
PCl_{5} + (COOH)_{2} → POCl_{3} + CO + CO_{2} + 2 HCl

=== Other methods ===
Reduction of tricalcium phosphate with carbon in the presence of chlorine gas:

Ca_{3}(PO_{4})_{2} + 6 C + 6 Cl_{2} → 3 CaCl_{2} + 6 CO + 2 POCl_{3}

The reaction of phosphorus pentoxide with sodium chloride is also reported:

2 P_{2}O_{5} + 3 NaCl → 3 NaPO_{3} + POCl_{3}

== Uses ==
Phosphoryl chloride is used on an industrial scale for the manufacture of phosphate esters (organophosphates). These have a wide range of uses, including as flame retardants (bisphenol A diphenyl phosphate, TCPP and tricresyl phosphate), plasticisers for PVC and related polymers ( 2-ethylhexyl diphenyl phosphate) and hydraulic fluids. POCl_{3} is also used in the production of organophosphate insecticides.

In the semiconductor industry, POCl_{3} is used as a safe liquid phosphorus source in diffusion processes. The phosphorus acts as a dopant used to create n-type layers on a silicon wafer.

=== As a reagent ===
In the laboratory, POCl_{3} is a reagent in dehydrations. One example involves conversion of formamides to isonitriles (isocyanides); primary amides to nitriles:

RC(O)NH_{2} + POCl_{3} → RCN + P(O)OHCl + 2 HCl

In a related reaction, certain aryl-substituted amides can be cyclized using the Bischler-Napieralski reaction.

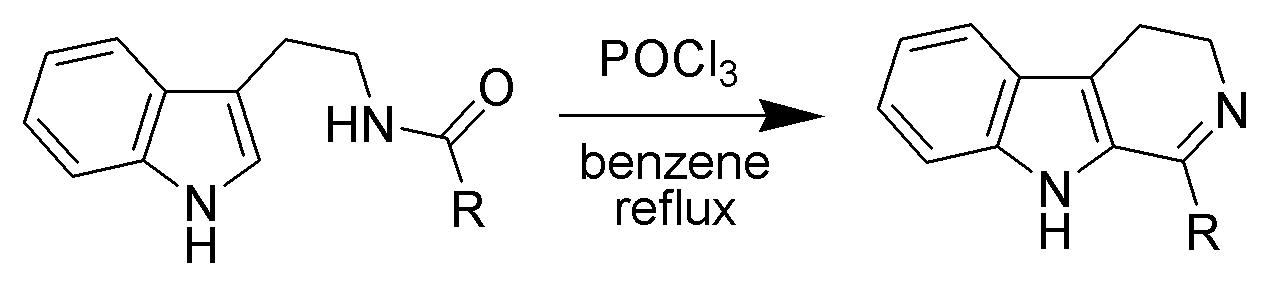

Such reactions are believed to proceed via an imidoyl chloride. In certain cases, the imidoyl chloride is the final product. For example, pyridones and pyrimidones can be converted to chloro- derivatives such as 2-chloropyridines and 2-chloropyrimidines, which are intermediates in the pharmaceutical industry.

In the Vilsmeier-Haack reaction, POCl_{3} reacts with amides to produce a "Vilsmeier reagent", a chloro-iminium salt, which subsequently reacts with electron-rich aromatic compounds to produce aromatic aldehydes upon aqueous work-up.
