= Phosphorus trifluoride =

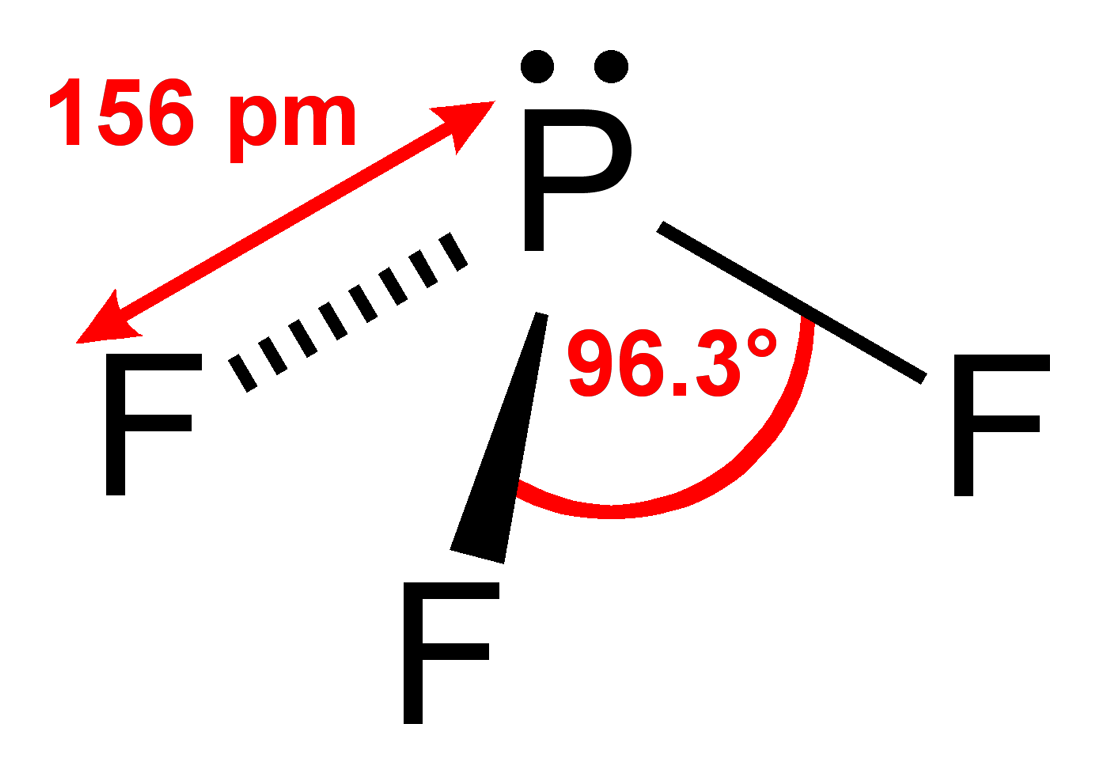
Structure and dimensions of phosphorus trifluoride
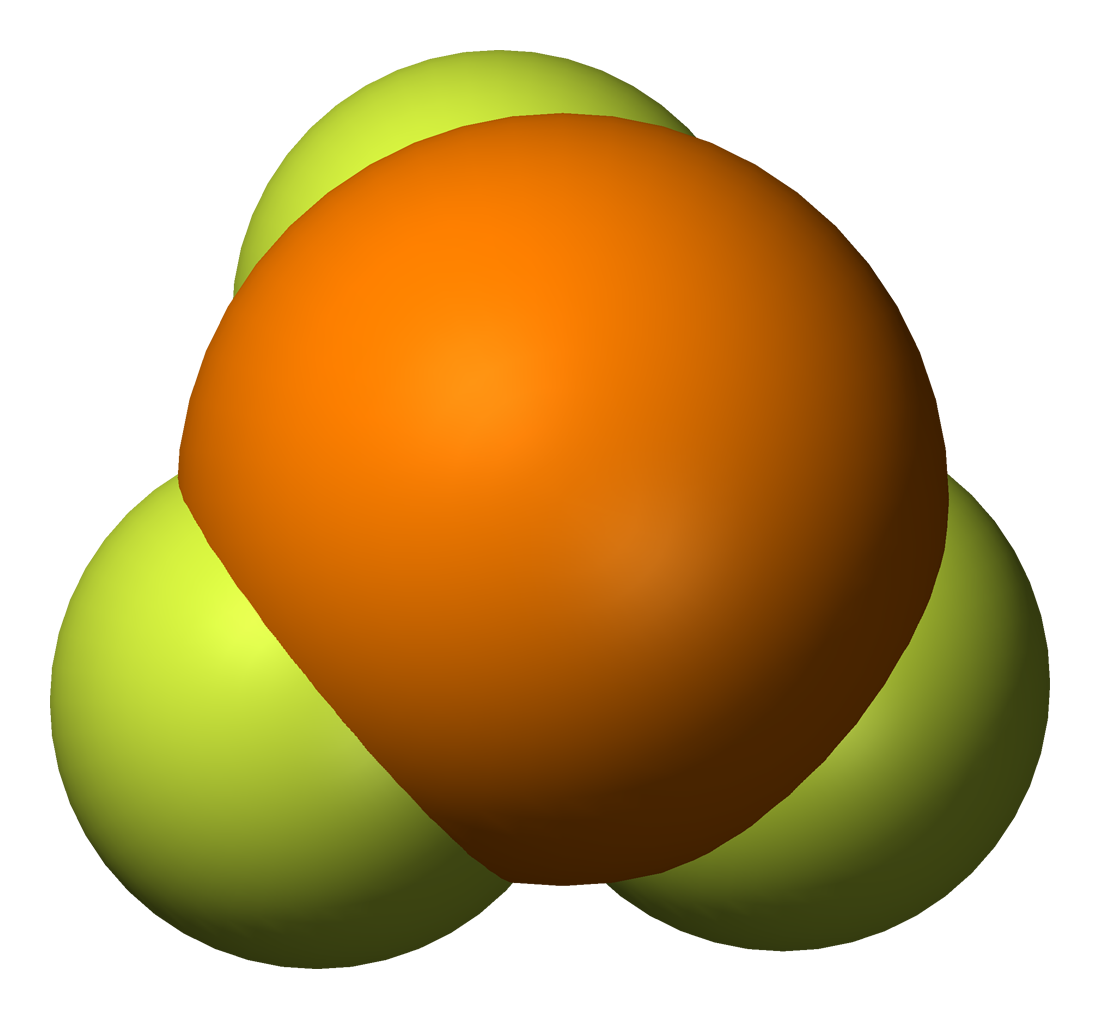
Space-filling model of phosphorus trifluoride

Names
- IUPAC names Phosphorus trifluoride Phosphorus(III) fluoride Trifluorophosphane; Trifluoridophosphorus; Perfluorophosphane
- Other names Trifluorophosphine; Phosphorous fluoride TL-75

Identifiers
CAS Number	7783-55-3
3D model (JSmol)	Interactive image
ChEBI	CHEBI:30205
ChemSpider	56416
ECHA InfoCard	100.029.098
PubChem CID	62665
RTECS number	TH3850000
UNII	496073DYBF
CompTox Dashboard (EPA)	DTXSID6064826
- InChI: InChI=1S/F3P/c1-4(2)3 Key: WKFBZNUBXWCCHG-UHFFFAOYSA-N; InChI=1/F3P/c1-4(2)3 Key: WKFBZNUBXWCCHG-UHFFFAOYAK
- SMILES: FP(F)F

Properties
Chemical formula	PF_{3}
Molar mass	87.968971 g/mol
Appearance	colorless gas
Density	3.91 g/L, gas
Melting point	−151.5 °C (−240.7 °F; 121.6 K)
Boiling point	−101.8 °C (−151.2 °F; 171.3 K)
Critical point (T, P)	−2.05 °C (28.3 °F; 271.1 K); 42.73 standard atmospheres (4,329.6 kPa; 628.0 psi)
Solubility in water	slow hydrolysis

Structure
Molecular shape	Trigonal pyramidal
Dipole moment	1.03 D

Hazards
NFPA 704 (fire diamond)	3 0 1
Flash point	Non-flammable

Related compounds
Other anions	Phosphorus trichloride Phosphorus tribromide Phosphorus triiodide Phosphane
Other cations	Nitrogen trifluoride Arsenic trifluoride Antimony trifluoride Bismuth trifluoride
Related ligands	Carbon monoxide
Related compounds	Phosphorus pentafluoride

Supplementary data page
- Phosphorus trifluoride (data page)
- Except where otherwise noted, data are given for materials in their standard state (at 25 °C [77 °F], 100 kPa). verify (what is ?) Infobox references

Phosphorus trifluoride (formula PF_{3}), is a colorless and odorless gas. It is highly toxic and reacts slowly with water. Its main use is as a ligand in metal complexes. As a ligand, it parallels carbon monoxide in metal carbonyls, and indeed its toxicity is due to its binding with the iron in blood hemoglobin in a similar way to carbon monoxide.

== Physical properties ==
Phosphorus trifluoride has an F−P−F bond angle of approximately 96.3°. Gaseous PF_{3} has a standard enthalpy of formation of −945 kJ/mol (−226 kcal/mol). The phosphorus atom has a nuclear magnetic resonance chemical shift of 97 ppm (downfield of H_{3}PO_{4}).

== Properties ==
Phosphorus trifluoride hydrolyzes especially at high pH, but it is less hydrolytically sensitive than phosphorus trichloride. It does not attack glass except at high temperatures, and anhydrous potassium hydroxide may be used to dry it with little loss. With hot metals, phosphides and fluorides are formed. With Lewis bases such as ammonia addition products (adducts) are formed, and PF_{3} is oxidized by oxidizing agents such as bromine or potassium permanganate.

Transition metal trifluorophosphine complexes are numerous. PF_{3} is a strong π-acceptor. It forms a variety of metal complexes with metals in low oxidation states. PF_{3} forms several complexes for which the corresponding CO derivatives (see metal carbonyl) are unstable or nonexistent. Thus, Pd(PF_{3})_{4} is known, but Pd(CO)_{4} is not. Such complexes are usually prepared directly from the related metal carbonyl compound, with loss of CO. However, nickel metal reacts directly with PF_{3} at 100 °C under 35 MPa pressure to form Ni(PF_{3})_{4}, which is analogous to Ni(CO)_{4}. Cr(PF_{3})_{6}, the analogue of Cr(CO)_{6}, may be prepared from dibenzenechromium:

Cr(C_{6}H_{6})_{2} + 6 PF_{3} → Cr(PF_{3})_{6} + 2 C_{6}H_{6}

Ball-and-stick model of [Pt(PF_{3})_{4}]	Space-filling model of [Pt(PF_{3})_{4}]

== Preparation ==
Phosphorus trifluoride is usually prepared from phosphorus trichloride via halogen exchange using various fluorides such as hydrogen fluoride, calcium fluoride, arsenic trifluoride, antimony trifluoride, or zinc fluoride:

2 PCl_{3} + 3 ZnF_{2} → 2 PF_{3} + 3 ZnCl_{2}

== Biological activity ==
Phosphorus trifluoride is similar to carbon monoxide in that it is a gas which strongly binds to iron in hemoglobin, preventing the blood from absorbing oxygen.

== Precautions ==
PF_{3} is highly toxic, comparable to phosgene.
