= Potassium hexafluoroarsenate =

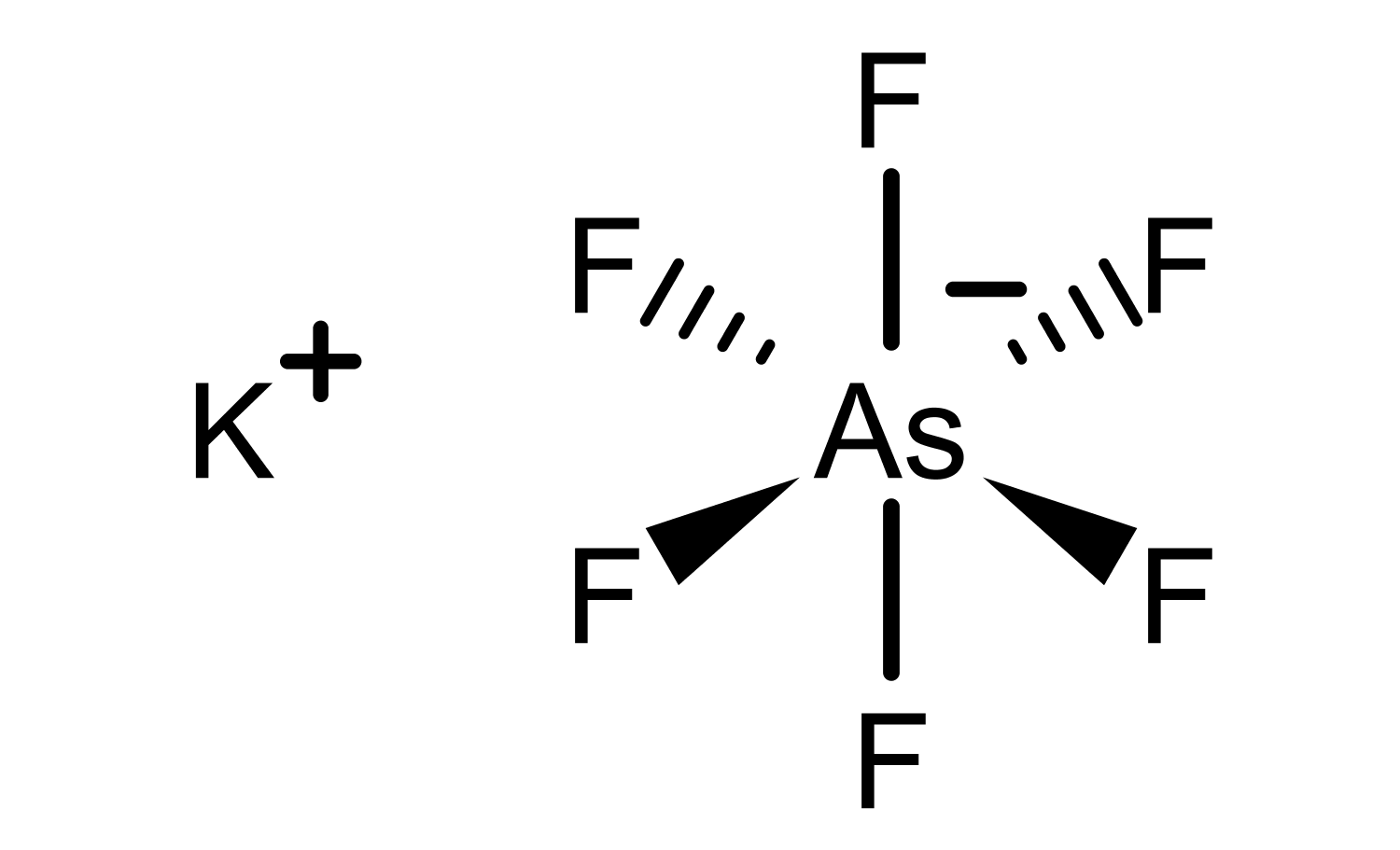

Names
- IUPAC name potassium hexafluoro-λ⁵-arsanuide

Identifiers
CAS Number	17029-22-0
3D model (JSmol)	Interactive image
ChEBI	CHEBI:82182
ChemSpider	140511
ECHA InfoCard	100.037.351
EC Number	241-102-7
KEGG	C19055
PubChem CID	159810
UNII	T7TYZ7585F
CompTox Dashboard (EPA)	DTXSID1066150
- InChI: InChI=1S/AsF6.K/c2-1(3,4,5,6)7;/q-1;+1 Key: DITNVAZRXJOPSJ-UHFFFAOYSA-N
- SMILES: F[As-](F)(F)(F)(F)F.[K+]

Properties
Chemical formula	AsF_{6}K
Molar mass	228.0103 g·mol^{−1}
Appearance	white powder
Melting point	400 °C (752 °F; 673 K)

Hazards
- GHS labelling
Pictograms	(GHS06: Toxic) (GHS09: Environmental hazard)
Signal word	Danger
Hazard statements	H301, H331, H410
Precautionary statements	P261, P264, P270, P271, P273, P301+P316, P304+P340, P316, P321, P330, P391, P403+P233, P405, P501
- Except where otherwise noted, data are given for materials in their standard state (at 25 °C [77 °F], 100 kPa). Infobox references

Potassium hexafluoroarsenate is an inorganic chemical compound with the chemical formula KAsF_{6}.

== Synthesis ==
Potassium hexafluoroarsenate can be prepared by direct action of arsenic pentafluoride and potassium fluoride:

AsF_{5} + KF → KAsF_{6}

Also, it can be synthesized by the action of hydrofluoric acid on arsenic pentafluoride in the presence of potassium perbromate:

KBrO_{4} + 3HF + 2AsF_{5} + KF → KAsF_{6} + AsF_{6}[H_{3}O]

Also, potassium hexafluoroarsenate is synthesized by treating arsenic pentachloride and potassium chloride in the presence of hydrofluoric acid:

AsCl_{5} + KCl + 6HF → KAsF_{6} + 6HCl

== Physical characteristics ==
Potassium hexafluoroarsenate is a white powder with a pungent odor. The compound is stable under normal conditions. The melting point is around 400 °C. The substance is not flammable. It is incompatible with strong oxidizing agents.

== Safety ==
Potassium hexafluoroarsenate is toxic when swallowed or inhaled and is hazardous to the environment. The compound is considered carcinogenic. Hazards in the event of fire include hydrogen fluoride, potassium oxide and arsenic oxides.
