= Arsenic fluoride =

Arsenic fluoride may refer to either of the following:

- Arsenic trifluoride, AsF_{3}, a colorless liquid
- Arsenic pentafluoride, AsF_{5}, a colorless gas
