= Arsenic chloride =

Arsenic chloride may refer to either of the following:

- Arsenic trichloride, AsCl_{3}
- Arsenic pentachloride, AsCl_{5}
