= Phosphorus pentafluoride =

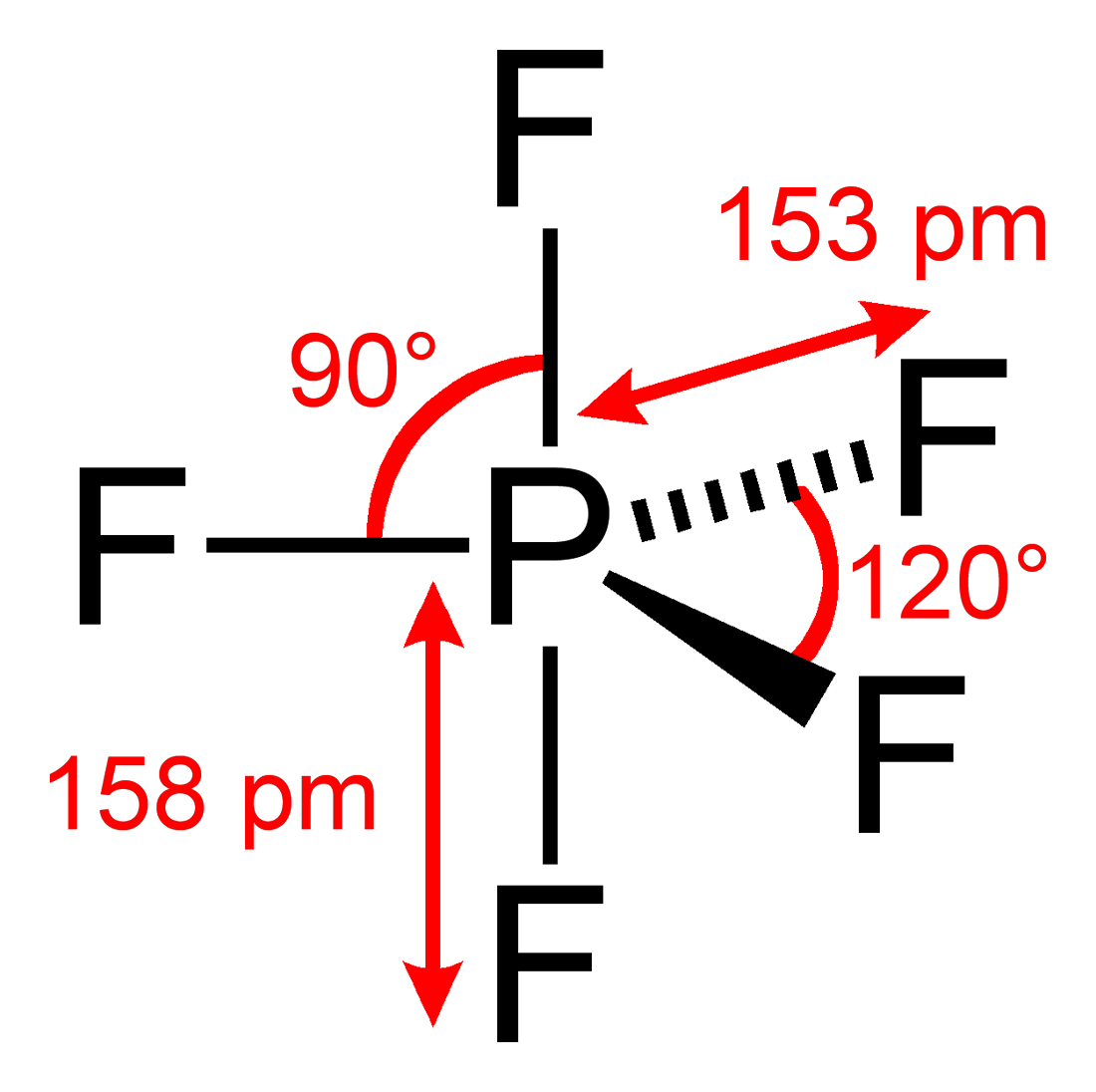
- Structure of the phosphorus pentafluoride molecule

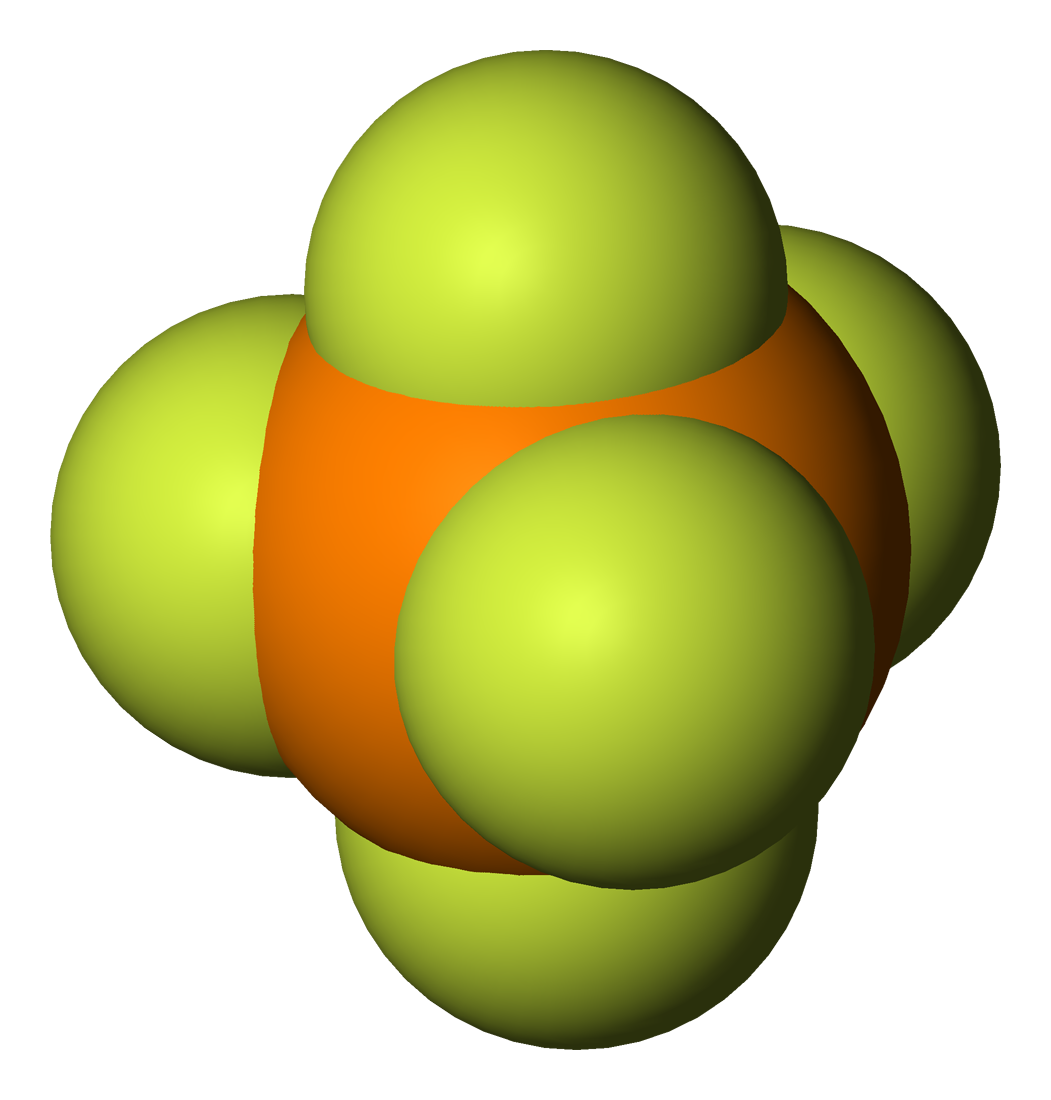
- Space-filling model of the phosphorus pentafluoride molecule

Names
- IUPAC name Phosphorus pentafluoride
- Other names: Phosphorus(V) fluoride; Pentafluoridophosphorus; Pentafluorophosphorane

Identifiers
CAS Number	7647-19-0
3D model (JSmol)	Interactive image
ChemSpider	22715
ECHA InfoCard	100.028.730
EC Number	231-602-3
PubChem CID	24295
RTECS number	TH4070000
UNII	0OU1ESO71L
UN number	2198
CompTox Dashboard (EPA)	DTXSID9064760
- InChI: InChI=1S/F5P/c1-6(2,3,4)5 Key: OBCUTHMOOONNBS-UHFFFAOYSA-N; InChI=1/F5P/c1-6(2,3,4)5 Key: OBCUTHMOOONNBS-UHFFFAOYAH
- SMILES: FP(F)(F)(F)F

Properties
Chemical formula	PF_{5}
Molar mass	125.965777813 g·mol^{−1}
Appearance	colourless gas
Odor	unpleasant
Density	5.527 kg/m^{3}
Melting point	−93.78 °C (−136.80 °F; 179.37 K)
Boiling point	−84.6 °C (−120.3 °F; 188.6 K)
Critical point (T, P)	19 °C (66.2 °F; 292.1 K), 33.9 standard atmospheres (3,430 kPa; 498 psi)
Solubility in water	hydrolysis

Structure
Molecular shape	trigonal bipyramidal
Dipole moment	0 D

Hazards
Flash point	Non-flammable

Related compounds
Other anions	Phosphorus pentachloride; Phosphorus pentabromide; Phosphorus pentaiodide; Phosphorus trifluorodichloride
Other cations	Arsenic pentafluoride; Antimony pentafluoride; Bismuth pentafluoride
Related compounds	Phosphorus trifluoride
- Except where otherwise noted, data are given for materials in their standard state (at 25 °C [77 °F], 100 kPa). verify (what is ?) Infobox references

Phosphorus pentafluoride is a chemical compound with the chemical formula PF_{5}. It is a phosphorus halide. It is a colourless, toxic gas that fumes in air.

== Preparation ==
Phosphorus pentafluoride was first prepared in 1876 by the fluorination of phosphorus pentachloride using arsenic trifluoride, which remains a favored method:

3 PCl_{5} + 5 AsF_{3} → 3 PF_{5} + 5 AsCl_{3}

Phosphorus pentafluoride can be prepared by direct combination of phosphorus and fluorine:

P_{4} + 10 F_{2} → 4 PF_{5}

== Structure ==
Single-crystal X-ray studies indicate that the PF_{5} has trigonal bipyramidal geometry. Thus it has two distinct types of P−F bonds (axial and equatorial): the length of an axial P−F bond is distinct from the equatorial P−F bond in the solid phase, but not the liquid or gas phases due to Berry pseudo rotation.

Fluorine-19 NMR spectroscopy, even at temperatures as low as −100 °C (−148 °F; 173 K), fails to distinguish the axial from the equatorial fluorine environments. The apparent equivalency arises from the low barrier for pseudorotation via the Berry mechanism, by which the axial and equatorial fluorine atoms rapidly exchange positions. The apparent equivalency of the F centers in PF_{5} was first noted by Gutowsky. The explanation was first described by R. Stephen Berry, after whom the Berry mechanism is named. Berry pseudorotation influences the ^{19}F NMR spectrum of PF_{5} since NMR spectroscopy operates on a millisecond timescale. Electron diffraction and X-ray crystallography do not detect this effect as the solid state structures are, relative to a molecule in solution, static and can not undergo the necessary changes in atomic position.

== Lewis acidity ==
Phosphorus pentafluoride is a Lewis acid. This property is relevant to its ready hydrolysis. A well studied adduct is PF_{5} with pyridine. With primary and secondary amines, the adducts convert readily to dimeric amino-bridged derivatives with the formula [PF_{4}(NR_{2})]_{2}. A variety of complexes are known with bidentate ligands.

Hexafluorophosphoric acid (H[PF_{6}]) is derived from phosphorus pentafluoride and hydrogen fluoride. Its conjugate base, hexafluorophosphate ([PF_{6}]^{−}), is a useful non-coordinating anion. It is often used in lithium-ion batteries, where besides providing good ionic conductivity for the liquid electrolyte, it also passivates positive aluminium current collector.
