= Antimony chloride =

Antimony chloride may refer to either of the following:

- Antimony trichloride, SbCl_{3}
- Antimony pentachloride, SbCl_{5}
