= Phosphorus pentaiodide =

Names
- IUPAC name Phosphorus(V) iodide
- Other names: Pentaiodophosphorane; Pentaiodophosphorus; Phosphorus pentaiodide; Tetraiodophosphonium iodide

Identifiers
CAS Number	66656-29-9
3D model (JSmol)	Interactive image
ChemSpider	10459963
PubChem CID	12617301
CompTox Dashboard (EPA)	DTXSID30504485
- InChI: InChI=1S/I5P/c1-6(2,3,4)5 Key: NCCBCEHAGCSKEA-UHFFFAOYSA-N
- SMILES: P(I)(I)(I)(I)I

Properties
Chemical formula	PI_{5}
Molar mass	665.49611 g·mol^{−1}
Appearance	Brown-black crystalline solid (disputed)
Melting point	41 °C (106 °F; 314 K) (disputed)

Related compounds
Related compounds	Phosphorus pentafluoride; Phosphorus pentachloride; Phosphorus pentabromide
- Except where otherwise noted, data are given for materials in their standard state (at 25 °C [77 °F], 100 kPa). Infobox references

Phosphorus pentaiodide is a hypothetical inorganic compound with formula PI_{5}. The existence of this compound has been claimed intermittently since the early 1900s. The claim is disputed: "The pentaiodide does not exist (except perhaps as PI_{3}·I_{2}, but certainly not as [PI_{4}]^{+}I^{−}...)".

== Claims ==
Phosphorus pentaiodide was reported to be a brown-black crystalline solid, melting at 41 °C, produced by the reaction of lithium iodide and phosphorus pentachloride in methyl iodide, however, this claim is disputed and probably generated a mixture of phosphorus triiodide and iodine.

Although phosphorus pentaiodide has been claimed to exist in the form of [PI_{4}]^{+}I^{−} (tetraiodophosphonium iodide), experimental and theoretical data refutes this claim.

== Derivatives ==
Unlike the elusive PI_{5}, the [PI_{4}]^{+} cation (tetraiodophosphonium cation) is widely known. This cation is known to produce salts with the anions tetraiodoaluminate [AlI_{4}]^{−}, hexafluoroarsenate [AsF_{6}]^{−}, hexafluoroantimonate [SbF_{6}]^{−} and tetraiodogallate [GaI_{4}]^{−}.
