= Phosphorus pentachloride =

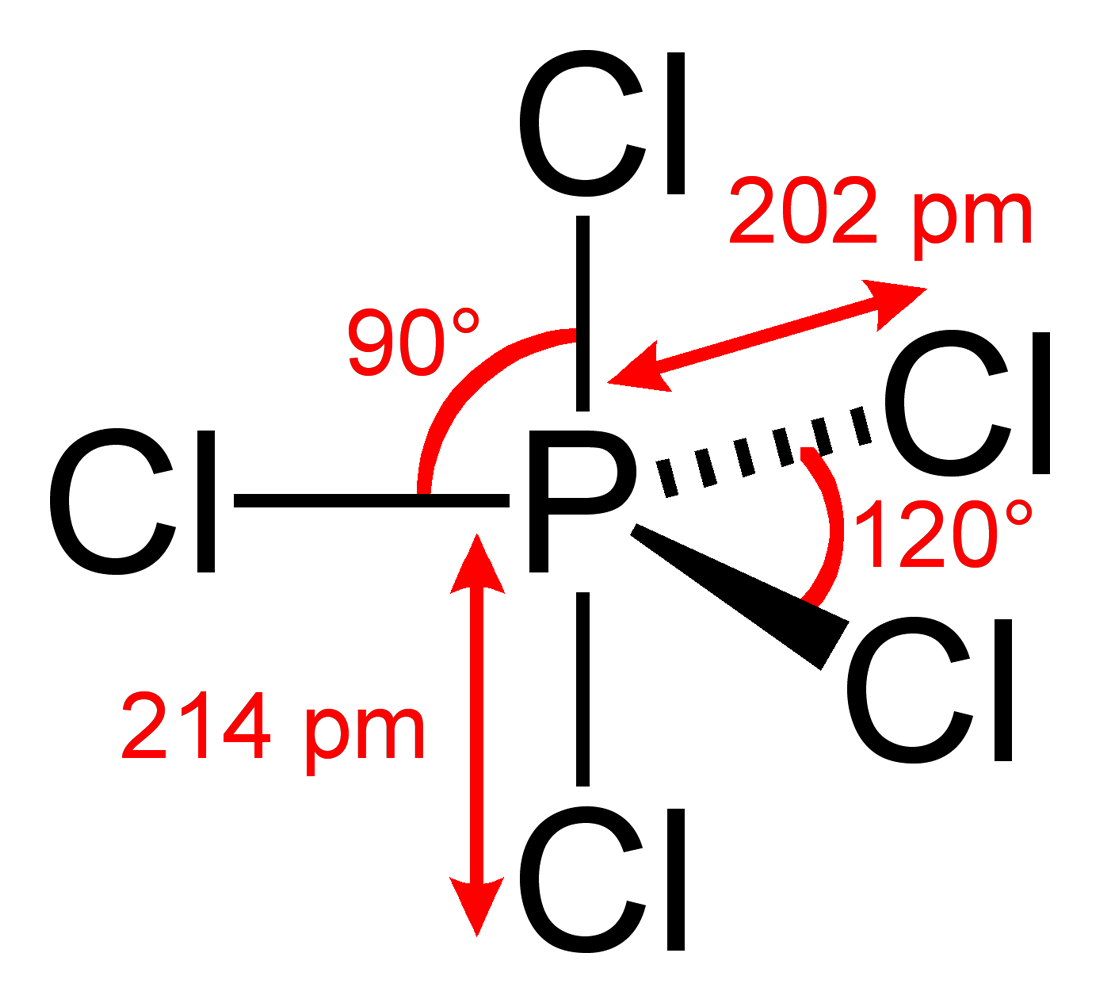
- Phosphorus pentachloride (gas phase structure)

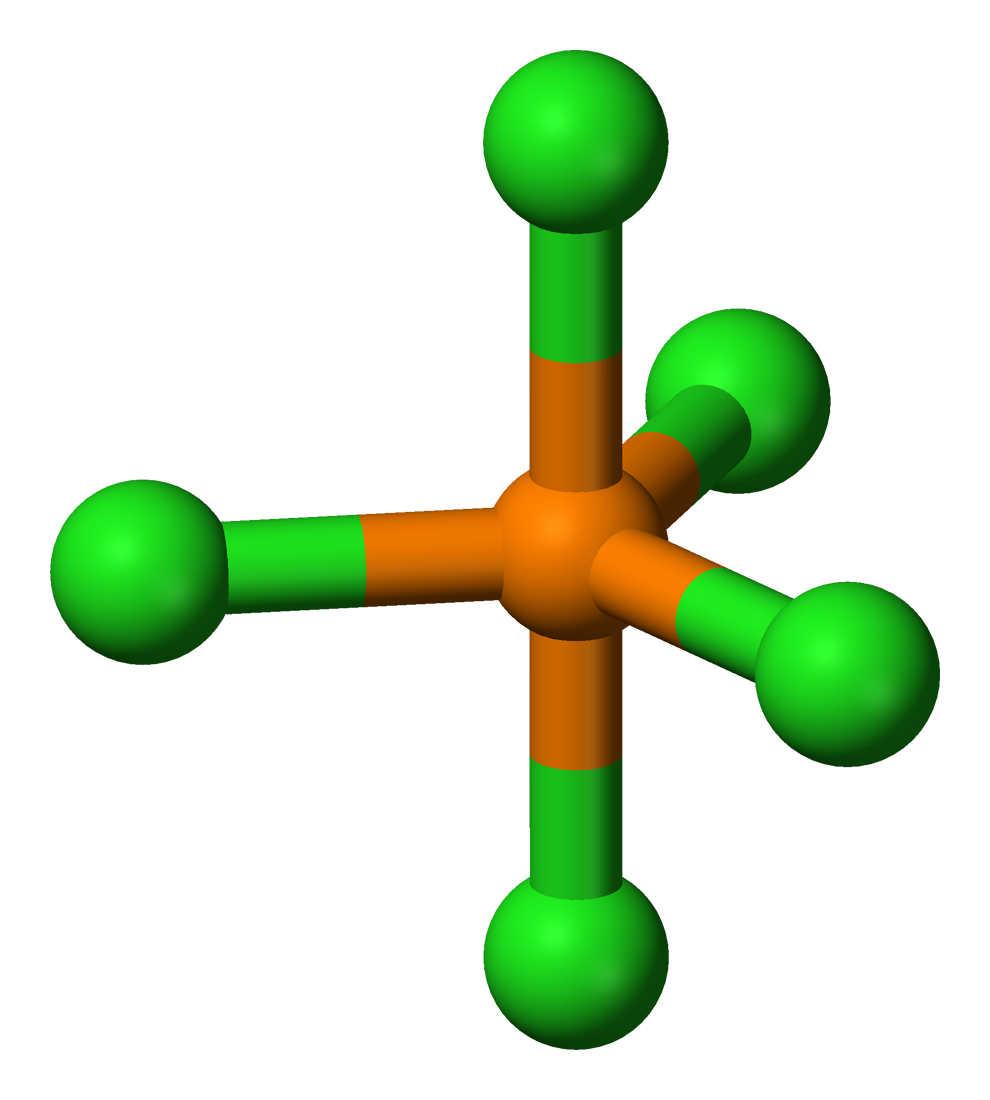
Phosphorus pentachloride
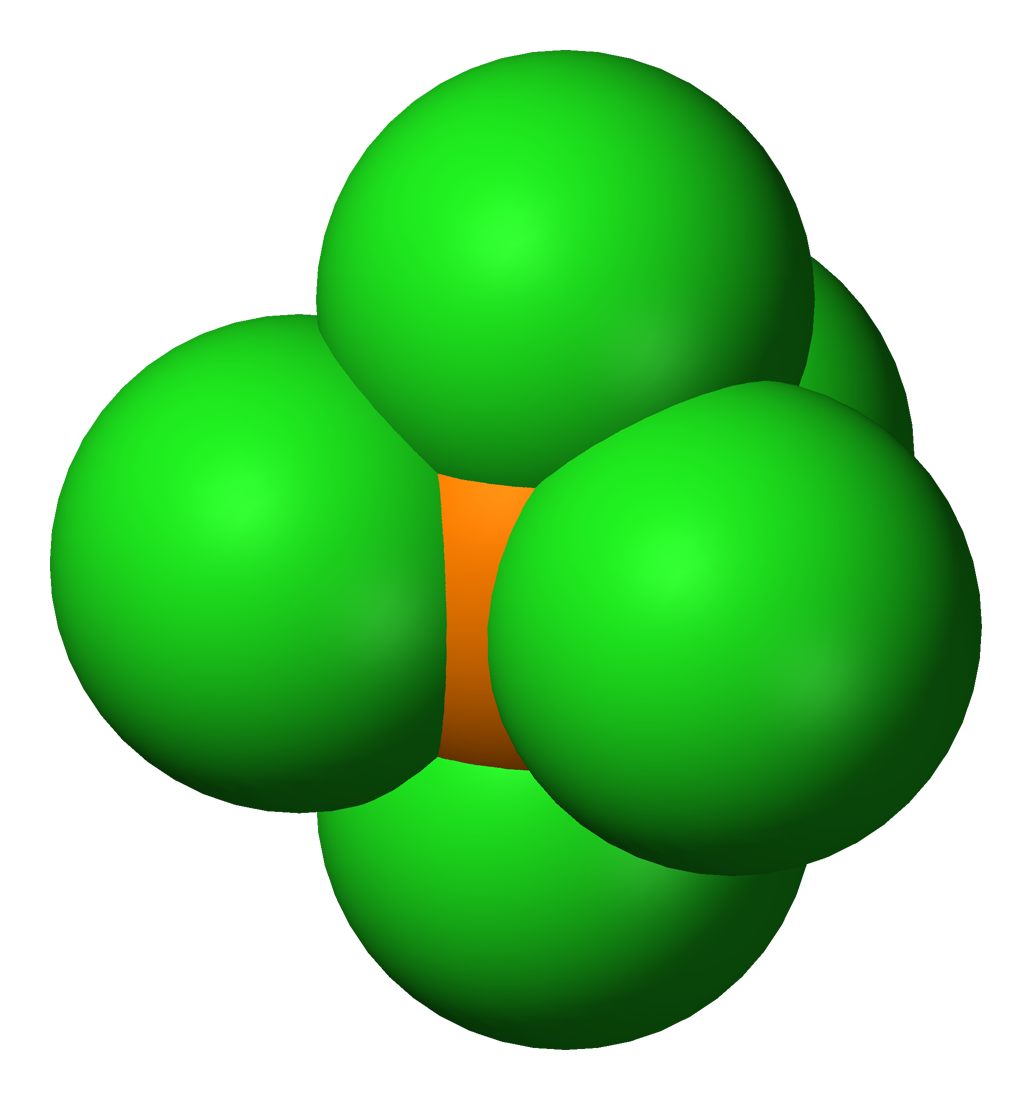

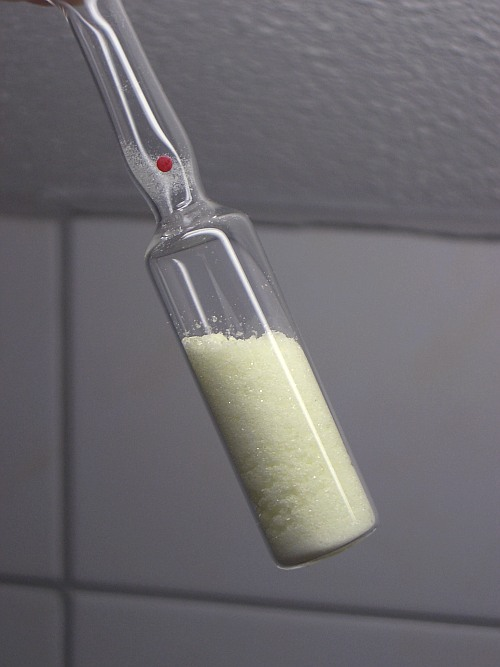

Names
- IUPAC names Phosphorus pentachloride Pentachloro-λ^{5}-phosphane
- Other names Pentachlorophosphorane

Identifiers
CAS Number	10026-13-8
3D model (JSmol)	Interactive image
ChemSpider	23204
ECHA InfoCard	100.030.043
EC Number	233-060-3
PubChem CID	24819
RTECS number	TB6125000
UNII	0EX753TYDU
UN number	1806
CompTox Dashboard (EPA)	DTXSID9033896
- InChI: InChI=1S/Cl5P/c1-6(2,3,4)5 Key: UHZYTMXLRWXGPK-UHFFFAOYSA-N; InChI=1/Cl5P/c1-6(2,3,4)5 Key: UHZYTMXLRWXGPK-UHFFFAOYAP
- SMILES: ClP(Cl)(Cl)(Cl)Cl

Properties
Chemical formula	PCl_{5}
Molar mass	208.22 g·mol^{−1}
Appearance	Colorless crystals, but commercial samples often yellowish white crystals
Odor	pungent, unpleasant
Density	2.1 g/cm^{3}
Melting point	160.5 °C (320.9 °F; 433.6 K)
Boiling point	166.8 °C (332.2 °F; 439.9 K) sublimation
Solubility in water	reacts
Solubility	soluble in CS_{2}, chlorocarbons, benzene
Vapor pressure	1.11 kPa (80 °C); 4.58 kPa (100 °C)

Structure
Crystal structure	tetragonal
Coordination geometry	D_{3h} (trigonal bipyramidal)
Dipole moment	0 D

Thermochemistry
Heat capacity (C)	111.5 J/(mol·K)
Std molar entropy (S^{⦵}_{298})	364.2 J/(mol·K)

Hazards
- GHS labelling
Pictograms	(GHS05: Corrosive) (GHS06: Toxic) (GHS08: Health hazard)
Signal word	Danger
Hazard statements	H302, H314, H330, H373
Precautionary statements	P260, P280, P284, P305+P351+P338, P310
NFPA 704 (fire diamond)	3 0 2 W
Flash point	Non-flammable
- Lethal dose or concentration (LD, LC)
LD_{50} (median dose)	660 mg/kg (rat, oral)
LC_{50} (median concentration)	205 mg/m^{3} (rat)
LC_{Lo} (lowest published)	1020 mg/m^{3} (mouse, 10 min)
- NIOSH (US health exposure limits)
PEL (Permissible)	TWA 1 mg/m^{3}
REL (Recommended)	TWA 1 mg/m^{3}
IDLH (Immediate danger)	70 mg/m^{3}
Safety data sheet (SDS)	ICSC 0544

Related compounds
Related phosphorus pentahalides	Phosphorus pentafluoride; Phosphorus pentabromide; Phosphorus pentaiodide; Phosphorus trifluorodichloride
Related compounds	Phosphorus trichloride; Phosphoryl chloride; Arsenic pentachloride; Antimony pentachloride; Bismuth pentachloride; Vanadium pentachloride
- Except where otherwise noted, data are given for materials in their standard state (at 25 °C [77 °F], 100 kPa). verify (what is ?) Infobox references

Phosphorus pentachloride is the chemical compound with the formula PCl_{5}. It is one of the most important phosphorus chlorides/oxychlorides, others being PCl_{3} and POCl_{3}. PCl_{5} finds use as a chlorinating reagent. It is a colourless, water-sensitive solid, although commercial samples can be yellowish and contaminated with hydrogen chloride.

== Structure ==
The structures for the phosphorus chlorides are invariably consistent with VSEPR theory. The structure of PCl_{5} depends on its environment. Gaseous and molten PCl_{5} is a neutral molecule with trigonal bipyramidal geometry and (D_{3h}) symmetry. The hypervalent nature of this species (as well as of [PCl_{6}]^{−}, see below) can be explained with the inclusion of non-bonding molecular orbitals (molecular orbital theory) or resonance (valence bond theory). This trigonal bipyramidal structure persists in nonpolar solvents, such as CS_{2} and CCl_{4}. In the solid state PCl_{5} is an ionic compound called tetrachlorophosphonium hexachlorophosphate formulated [PCl_{4}]^{+}[PCl_{6}]^{−}.

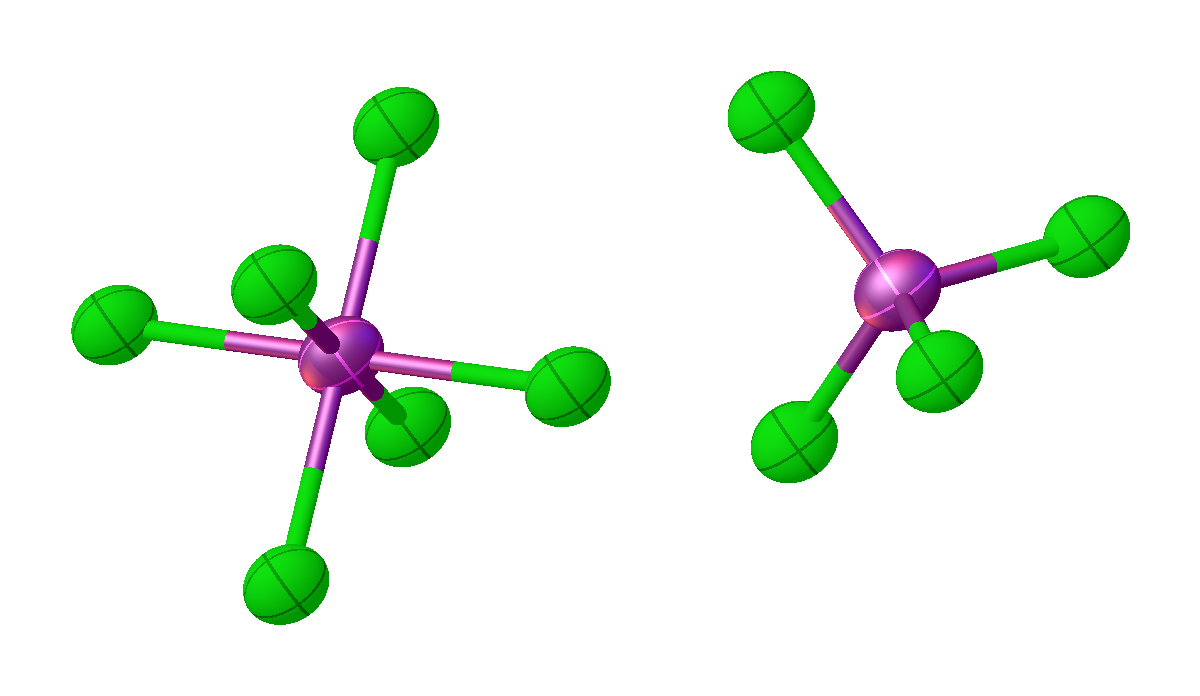
Structure of solid phosphorus pentachloride, illustrating its autoionization at higher concentrations.

In solutions of polar solvents, PCl_{5} undergoes self-ionization. Dilute solutions dissociate according to the following equilibrium:

PCl_{5} ⇌ [PCl_{4}]^{+} + Cl^{−}

At higher concentrations, a second equilibrium becomes more prevalent:

2 PCl_{5} ⇌ [PCl_{4}]^{+} + [PCl_{6}]^{−}

The cation [PCl_{4}]^{+} and the anion [PCl_{6}]^{−} are tetrahedral and octahedral, respectively. At one time, PCl_{5} in solution was thought to form a dimeric structure, P_{2}Cl_{10}, but this suggestion is not supported by Raman spectroscopic measurements.

=== Related pentachlorides ===
AsCl_{5} and SbCl_{5} also adopt trigonal bipyramidal structures. The relevant bond distances are 211 pm (As−Cl_{eq}), 221 pm (As−Cl_{ax}), 227 pm (Sb−Cl_{eq}), and 233.3 pm (Sb−Cl_{ax}). At low temperatures, SbCl_{5} converts to the dimer, dioctahedral Sb_{2}Cl_{10}, structurally related to niobium pentachloride.

== Preparation ==
PCl_{5} is prepared by the chlorination of PCl_{3}. This reaction is used to produce around 10,000 tonnes of PCl_{5} per year (as of 2000).

PCl_{3} + Cl_{2} ⇌ PCl_{5} (ΔH = −124 kJ/mol)

PCl_{5} exists in equilibrium with PCl_{3} and chlorine, and at 180 °C the degree of dissociation is about 40%. Because of this equilibrium, samples of PCl_{5} often contain chlorine, which imparts a greenish coloration.

== Reactions ==
=== Hydrolysis ===
In its most characteristic reaction, PCl_{5} reacts upon contact with water to release hydrogen chloride and give phosphorus oxides. The first hydrolysis product is phosphorus oxychloride:

PCl_{5} + H_{2}O → POCl_{3} + 2 HCl

In hot water, hydrolysis proceeds completely to orthophosphoric acid:

PCl_{5} + 4 H_{2}O → H_{3}PO_{4} + 5 HCl

=== Lewis acidity ===
Phosphorus pentachloride is a Lewis acid. This property underpins many of its characteristic reactions, autoionization, chlorinations, hydrolysis. A well studied adduct is PCl_{5}(pyridine).

=== Chlorination of organic compounds ===
In synthetic chemistry, two classes of chlorination are usually of interest: oxidative chlorinations and substitutive chlorinations. Oxidative chlorinations entail the transfer of Cl_{2} from the reagent to the substrate. Substitutive chlorinations entail replacement of O or OH groups with chloride. PCl_{5} can be used for both processes.

Upon treatment with PCl_{5}, carboxylic acids convert to the corresponding acyl chloride. The following mechanism has been proposed:

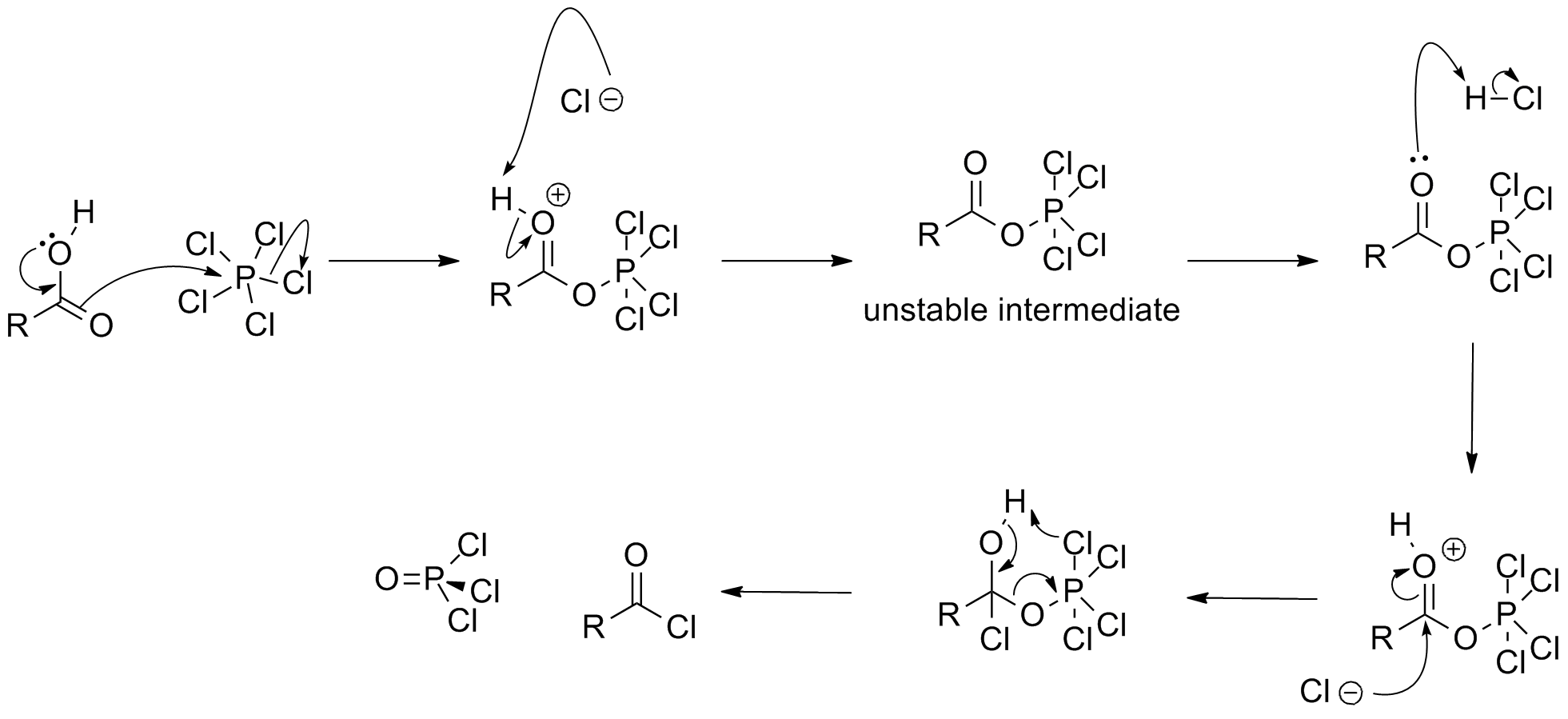

It also converts alcohols to alkyl chlorides. Thionyl chloride is more commonly used in the laboratory because the resultant sulfur dioxide is more easily separated from the organic products than is POCl_{3}.

PCl_{5} reacts with a tertiary amides, such as dimethylformamide (DMF), to give dimethylchloromethyleneammonium chloride, which is called the Vilsmeier reagent, [(CH_{3})_{2}N=CClH]^{+}Cl^{−}. More typically, a related salt is generated from the reaction of DMF and POCl_{3}. Such reagents are useful in the preparation of derivatives of benzaldehyde by formylation and for the conversion of C−OH groups into C−Cl groups.

It is especially renowned for the conversion of C=O groups to CCl_{2} groups. For example, benzophenone and phosphorus pentachloride react to give the diphenyldichloromethane:

(C_{6}H_{5})_{2}CO + PCl_{5} → (C_{6}H_{5})_{2}CCl_{2} + POCl_{3}

The electrophilic character of PCl_{5} is highlighted by its reaction with styrene to give, after hydrolysis, phosphonic acid derivatives.

=== Comparison with related reagents ===
Both PCl_{3} and PCl_{5} convert R_{3}COH groups to the chloride R_{3}CCl. The pentachloride is however a source of chlorine in many reactions. It chlorinates allylic and benzylic CH bonds. PCl_{5} bears a greater resemblance to SO_{2}Cl_{2}, also a source of Cl_{2}. For oxidative chlorinations on the laboratory scale, sulfuryl chloride is often preferred over PCl_{5} since the gaseous SO_{2} by-product is readily separated.

=== Chlorination of inorganic compounds ===
As for the reactions with organic compounds, the use of PCl_{5} has been superseded by SO_{2}Cl_{2}. The reaction of phosphorus pentoxide and PCl_{5} produces POCl_{3} :

6 PCl_{5} + P_{4}O_{10} → 10 POCl_{3}

PCl_{5} chlorinates nitrogen dioxide to form unstable nitryl chloride:

PCl_{5} + 2 NO_{2} → PCl_{3} + 2 NO_{2}Cl
2 NO_{2}Cl → 2 NO_{2} + Cl_{2}

PCl_{5} is a precursor for lithium hexafluorophosphate, Li[PF_{6}]. Lithium hexafluorophosphate is a commonly employed salt in electrolytes in lithium ion batteries. Li[PF_{6}] is produced by the reaction of PCl_{5} with lithium fluoride, with lithium chloride as a side product:

PCl_{5} + 6 LiF → Li[PF_{6}] + 5 LiCl

== Safety ==
PCl_{5} is a dangerous chemical as it reacts violently with water. It is also corrosive when in contact with skin. It is toxic and can be fatal when inhaled.

== History ==
Phosphorus pentachloride was first prepared in 1808 by the English chemist Humphry Davy. Davy's analysis of phosphorus pentachloride was inaccurate; the first accurate analysis was provided in 1816 by the French chemist Pierre Louis Dulong.

== See also ==
- Phosphorus halides
- Phosphorus trichloride
- Phosphoryl chloride
- Phosphorus trifluorodichloride
