= Donor number =

Measure of Lewis basicity

In chemistry a donor number (DN) is a quantitative measure of Lewis basicity. A donor number is defined as the negative enthalpy value for the 1:1 adduct formation between a Lewis base and the standard Lewis acid SbCl_{5} (antimony pentachloride), in dilute solution in the noncoordinating solvent 1,2-dichloroethane with a zero DN. The units are kilocalories per mole for historical reasons. The donor number is a measure of the ability of a solvent to solvate cations and Lewis acids. The method was developed by V. Gutmann in 1976. Likewise Lewis acids are characterized by acceptor numbers (AN, see Gutmann–Beckett method).

Typical solvent values are:

- acetonitrile 14.1 kcal/mol (59.0 kJ/mol)
- acetone 17 kcal/mol (71 kJ/mol)
- methanol 19 kcal/mol (79 kJ/mol)
- tetrahydrofuran 20 kcal/mol (84 kJ/mol)
- dimethylformamide (DMF) 26.6 kcal/mol (111 kJ/mol)
- dimethyl sulfoxide (DMSO) 29.8 kcal/mol (125 kJ/mol)
- ethanol 31.5 kcal/mol (132 kJ/mol)
- pyridine 33.1 kcal/mol (138 kJ/mol)
- triethylamine 61 kcal/mol (255 kJ/mol)

The donor number of a solvent can be measured via calorimetry, although it is frequently measured with nuclear magnetic resonance (NMR) spectroscopy using assumptions on complexation. A critical review of the donor number concept has pointed out the serious limitations of this affinity scale. Furthermore, it has been shown that to define the order of Lewis base strength (or Lewis acid strength) at least two properties must be considered. For Pearson qualitative HSAB theory, the two properties are hardness and strength, while for Drago's quantitative ECW model, the two properties are electrostatic and covalent.
