= Phosphorus heptabromide =

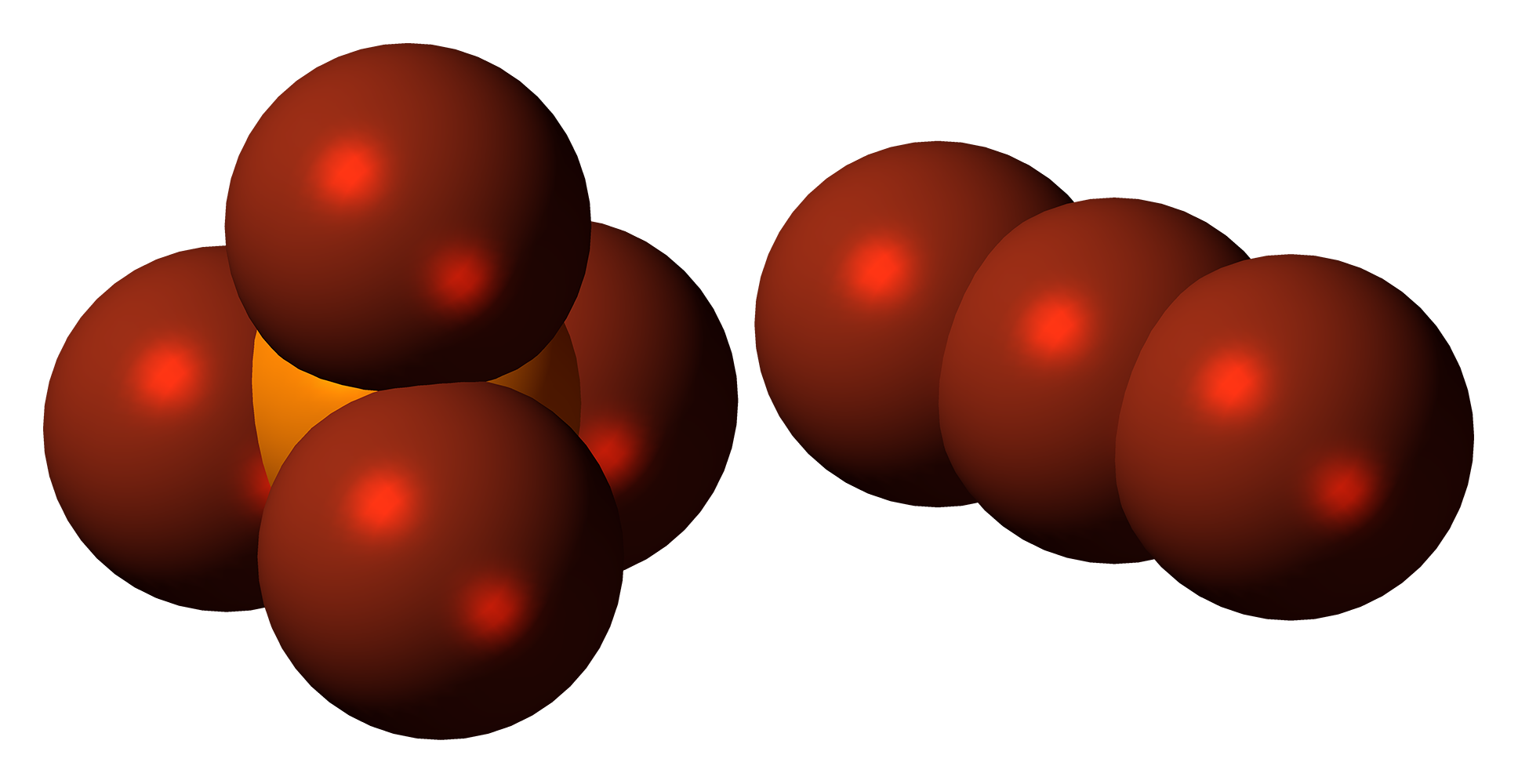

Names
- IUPAC name Tetrabromophosphanium tribromide
- Other names: Perbromophosphonium tribromide; Phosphorus heptabromide; Tetrabromophosphonium tribromide

Identifiers
CAS Number	14337-11-2
3D model (JSmol)	Interactive image
ChemSpider	57450667
PubChem CID	71308257
CompTox Dashboard (EPA)	DTXSID60745445
- InChI: InChI=1S/Br4P.Br3/c1-5(2,3)4;1-3-2/q+1;-1 Key: QBFSXBUUGDHSFY-UHFFFAOYSA-N
- SMILES: Br[P+](Br)(Br)Br.Br[Br-]Br

Properties
Chemical formula	PBr_{7}
Molar mass	590.302 g·mol^{−1}
Appearance	Red prismatic crystals

Structure
Crystal structure	Orthorhombic
Space group	Pnma, No. 62
Lattice constant	a = 9.35 Å, b = 7.94 Å, c = 14.69 Å
- Except where otherwise noted, data are given for materials in their standard state (at 25 °C [77 °F], 100 kPa). Infobox references

Phosphorus heptabromide is an inorganic compound with the chemical formula PBr_{7}. It is one of the phosphorus bromides. At normal conditions, it forms red prismatic crystals. PBr_{7} can be prepared by the sublimation of a mixture of phosphorus pentabromide and bromine.

PBr_{5} + Br_{2} → PBr_{7}

The structure of PBr_{7} consists of a tetrabromophosphonium cation [PBr_{4}]^{+}, paired with a tribromide anion [Br_{3}]^{−}, and the tribromide anion is non-symmetric.

== See also ==
- Phosphorus tribromide
- Phosphorus pentabromide
