= Phosphorus trifluorodichloride =

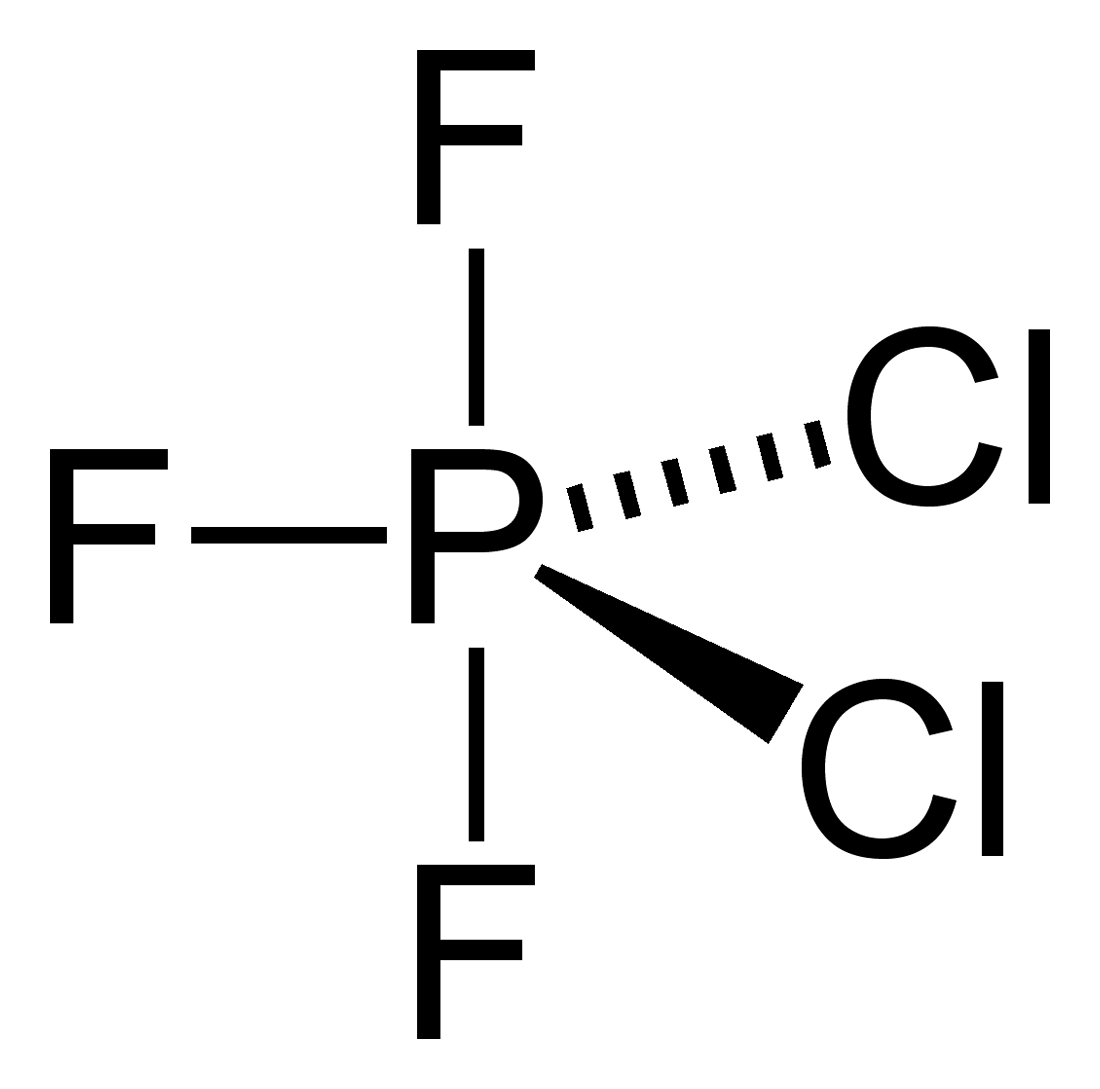

Identifiers
CAS Number	13454-99-4
ChemSpider	10331606
PubChem CID	23237515
CompTox Dashboard (EPA)	DTXSID601337094
- InChI: InChI=1S/Cl2F3P/c1-6(2,3,4)5 Key: PYMHWNZNAIBFHU-UHFFFAOYSA-N
- SMILES: FP(F)(Cl)(Cl)Cl

Properties
Chemical formula	PF_{3}Cl_{2}
Molar mass	158.87 g·mol^{−1}
Appearance	Colorless gas
Odor	disagreeable
Boiling point	−8 °C (18 °F; 265 K)

Related compounds
Related compounds	Antimony trifluorodichloride; Phosphorus pentafluoride; Phosphorus pentachloride
- Except where otherwise noted, data are given for materials in their standard state (at 25 °C [77 °F], 100 kPa). Infobox references

Phosphorus trifluorodichloride is a chemical compound with the chemical formula PF_{3}Cl_{2}. It is a toxic colorless gas with a disagreeable odor, and it turns into a liquid at −8 °C. The covalent molecule has trigonal bipyramidal molecular geometry. The central phosphorus atom has sp^{3}d hybridization, and the molecule has an asymmetric charge distribution.

Phosphorus trifluorodichloride is formed by mixing phosphorus trifluoride with chlorine gas:

PF_{3} + Cl_{2} → PF_{3}Cl_{2}

The P-F bond length is 154.6 pm for equatorial position and 159.3 pm for the axial position and the P-Cl bond length is 200.4 pm. The chlorine atoms are in equatorial positions in the molecule.
