= Bismuth pentafluoride =

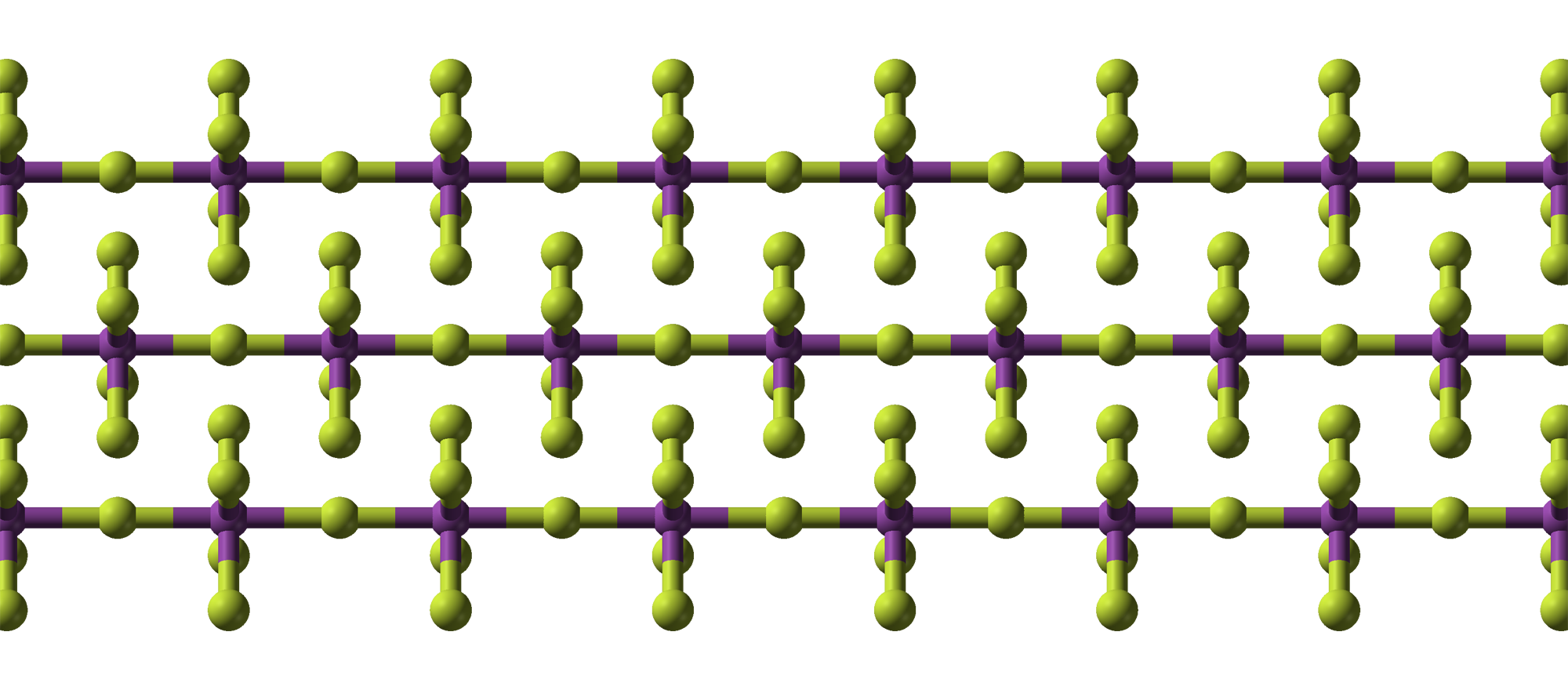

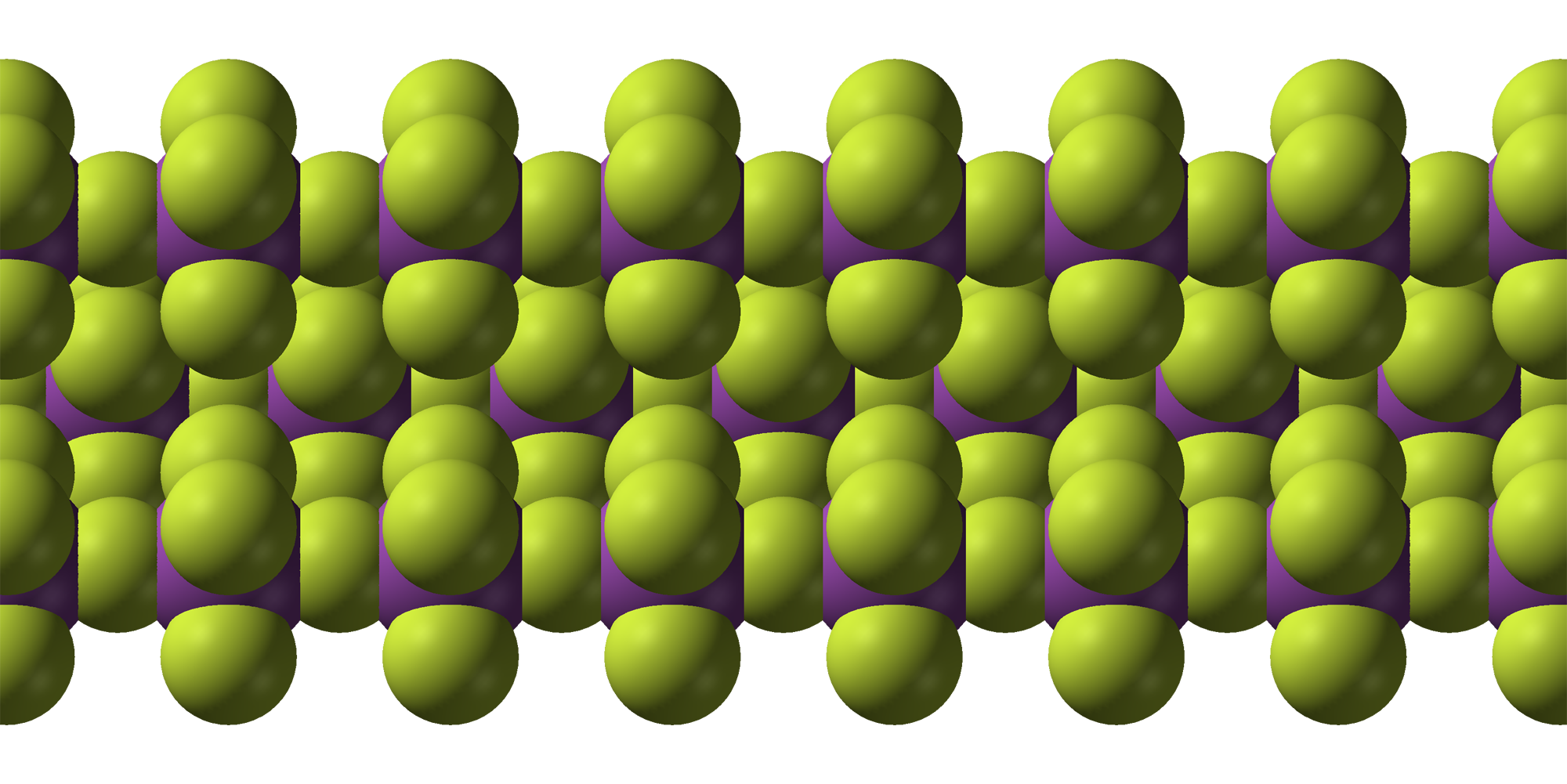

Names
- Other names bismuth(V) fluoride

Identifiers
| CAS Number | 7787-62-4 |
| 3D model (JSmol) | Interactive image |
| ChEBI | CHEBI:30426 |
| ChemSpider | 21172752 |
| ECHA InfoCard | 100.029.205 |
| PubChem CID | 123260 |
| UNII | BX273GFK98 |
| CompTox Dashboard (EPA) | DTXSID10228490 |
- InChI: InChI=1/Bi.5FH.3H/h;5*1H;;;/q+3;;;;;;;;/p-5/rBiH3.5FH/h1H3;5*1H/q+3;;;;;/p-5 Key: MELFHUKMGVSOTN-COTDSHSIAY
- SMILES: F[Bi](F)(F)(F)F

Properties
| Chemical formula | BiF_{5} |
| Molar mass | 303.97 g mol^{−1} |
| Appearance | long white needles, colourless crystalline solid |
| Density | 5.40 g cm^{−3} |
| Melting point | 151.4 °C (304.5 °F; 424.5 K) , 154.4 °C |
| Boiling point | 230 °C (446 °F; 503 K) |

Structure
| Coordination geometry | octahedral Bi |

Hazards
- GHS labelling
| Pictograms | (GHS03: Oxidizing) (GHS05: Corrosive) |
| Signal word | Danger |
| Hazard statements | H272, H314 |
| Precautionary statements | P210, P220, P221, P260, P264, P280, P301+P330+P331, P303+P361+P353, P304+P340, P305+P351+P338, P310, P321, P363, P370+P378, P405, P501 |
| NFPA 704 (fire diamond) | 4 0 3 W; OX |
| Flash point | non-combustible |
| Safety data sheet (SDS) | MSDS |

Related compounds
| Other anions | bismuth trichloride, bismuth tribromide, bismuth triiodide, pentamethylbismuth |
| Other cations | phosphorus pentafluoride, arsenic pentafluoride, antimony pentafluoride |
| Related compounds | bismuth trifluoride |
- Except where otherwise noted, data are given for materials in their standard state (at 25 °C [77 °F], 100 kPa). Infobox references

Bismuth pentafluoride is an inorganic compound with the formula BiF_{5}. It is a white solid that is highly reactive. The compound is of interest to researchers but not of particular value.

== Structure ==
BiF_{5} is polymeric and consists of linear chains of trans-bridged corner sharing BiF_{6} octahedra. This is the same structure as α-UF_{5}.

| (BiF_{5})_{∞} chain | packing of chains |

== Preparation ==
BiF_{5} can be prepared by treating BiF_{3} with F_{2} at 500 °C.

BiF_{3} + F_{2} → BiF_{5}

In an alternative synthesis, ClF_{3} is the fluorinating agent at 350 °C.

BiF_{3} + ClF_{3} → BiF_{5} + ClF

== Reactions ==
Bismuth pentafluoride is the most reactive of the pnictogen pentafluorides and is an extremely strong fluorinating agent. It reacts vigorously with water to form ozone and oxygen difluoride, and with iodine or sulfur at room temperature. BiF_{5} fluorinates paraffin oil (hydrocarbons) to fluorocarbons above 50 °C and oxidises UF_{4} to UF_{6} at 150 °C. At 180 °C, bismuth pentafluoride fluorinates Br_{2} to BrF_{3} and Cl_{2} to ClF.

BiF_{5} also reacts with alkali metal fluorides, MF, to form hexafluorobismuthates, M[BiF_{6}], containing the hexafluorobismuthate anion, [BiF_{6}]^{−}. Bismuth pentafluoride in hydrofluoric acid solvent also reacts with nickel fluoride to form the nickel salt of this anion, which can be incorporated into a complex with acetonitrile.
