= Phosphorus pentabromide =

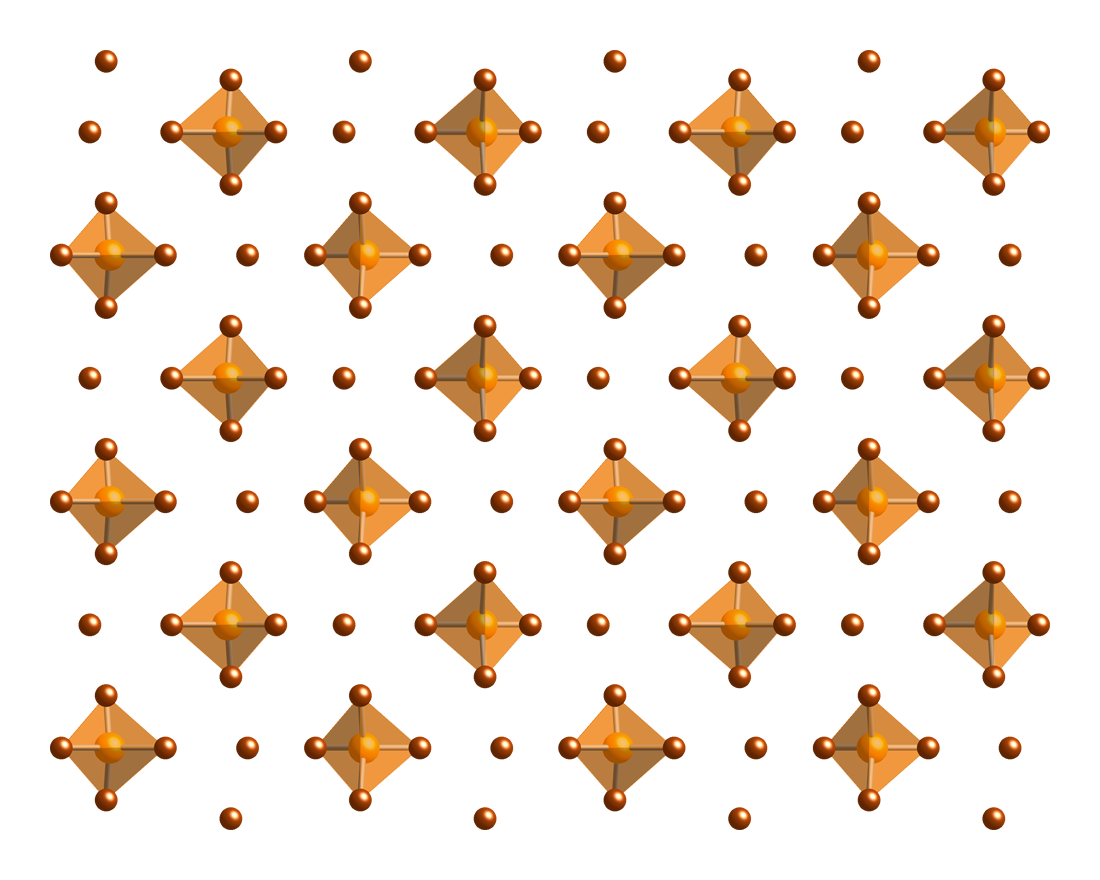

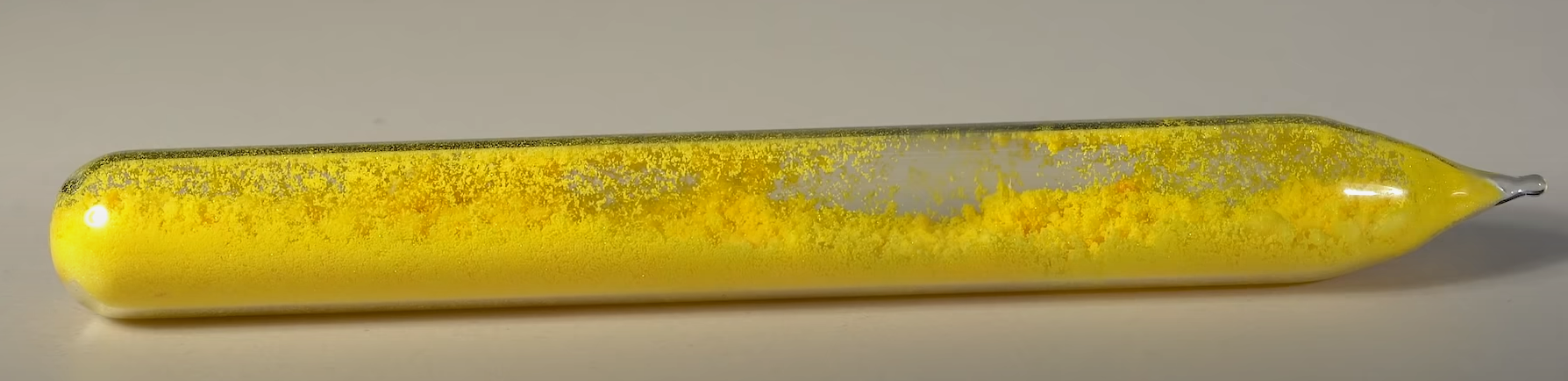

Names
- IUPAC name Tetrabromophosphanium bromide
- Other names: Pentabromo-λ^{5}-phosphane; Pentabromophosphorane; Phosphorus(V) bromide; Phosphorus pentabromide; Tetrabromophosphonium bromide

Identifiers
CAS Number	7789-69-7
3D model (JSmol)	Interactive image
ChemSpider	56429
ECHA InfoCard	100.029.260
EC Number	232-186-6
PubChem CID	62678
UNII	3D9WIS0BQW
UN number	2691
CompTox Dashboard (EPA)	DTXSID6064874
- InChI: InChI=1S/Br5P/c1-6(2,3,4)5 Key: QRKVRHZNLKTPGF-UHFFFAOYSA-N
- SMILES: BrP(Br)(Br)(Br)Br

Properties
Chemical formula	PBr_{5}
Molar mass	430.494 g·mol^{−1}
Appearance	Yellow crystalline solid
Density	3.61 g/cm^{3}
Melting point	ca. 100 °C (decomposes)
Boiling point	106 °C (223 °F; 379 K) (decomposes)
Solubility in water	Reacts with water
Solubility	Decomposes in ethanol Soluble in CCl_{4} and CS_{2}

Hazards
- Occupational safety and health (OHS/OSH)
Main hazards	Causes severe skin burns and eye damage
- GHS labelling
Pictograms	(GHS05: Corrosive)
Signal word	Danger
Hazard statements	H314
Precautionary statements	P260, P264, P280, P301+P330+P331, P302+P361+P354, P304+P340, P305+P354+P338, P316, P321, P363, P405, P501

Related compounds
Related compounds	Phosphorus pentafluoride; Phosphorus pentachloride; Phosphorus pentaiodide; Phosphorus tribromide; Phosphorus heptabromide; Phosphoryl bromide
- Except where otherwise noted, data are given for materials in their standard state (at 25 °C [77 °F], 100 kPa). verify (what is ?) Infobox references

Phosphorus pentabromide is the inorganic compound with the formula PBr_{5}. It is a yellow ionic solid that is used in organobromine compounds. The compound participates in diverse equilibria, especially in the presence of additional bromine.

== Synthesis and structure ==
Unlike phosphorus pentachloride, solid phosphorus pentabromide is an ionic compound. Its structural formula is [PBr_{4}]^{+}Br^{−} (tetrabromophosphonium bromide). The [PBr_{4}]^{+}] cation is tetrahedral. According to X-ray crystallography, the P-Br bond lengths are 215 picometers.

In the vapor phase, it dissociates into PBr_{3} and Br_{2}. Rapid cooling of the vapor to 15 K gives a mixture of phosphorus tribromide and the similarly ionic phosphorus heptabromide (tetrabromophosphonium tribromide or [PBr_{4}]^{+}[Br_{3}]^{−}).

PBr_{5} can be synthesized with high purity by bromination of a solution of PBr_{3} in CS_{2}:

PBr_{3} + Br_{2} → PBr_{5}

Addition of Br_{2} to PBr_{3} is complicated because phosphorus pentabromide can further convert to phosphorus heptabromide, which features the tribromide ion:

PBr_{5} + Br_{2} → [PBr_{4}]^{+}Br^{−}_{3}

== Organic chemistry ==
Phosphorus pentabromide is used in organic chemistry to convert carboxylic acids to acyl bromides.

== Safety ==
Phosphorus pentabromide is a skin irritant and a source of bromine, a strong oxidant.

== Related compounds ==
Triphenylphosphine dibromide, (C_{6}H_{5})_{3}PBr_{2}
