= Arsenic pentachloride =

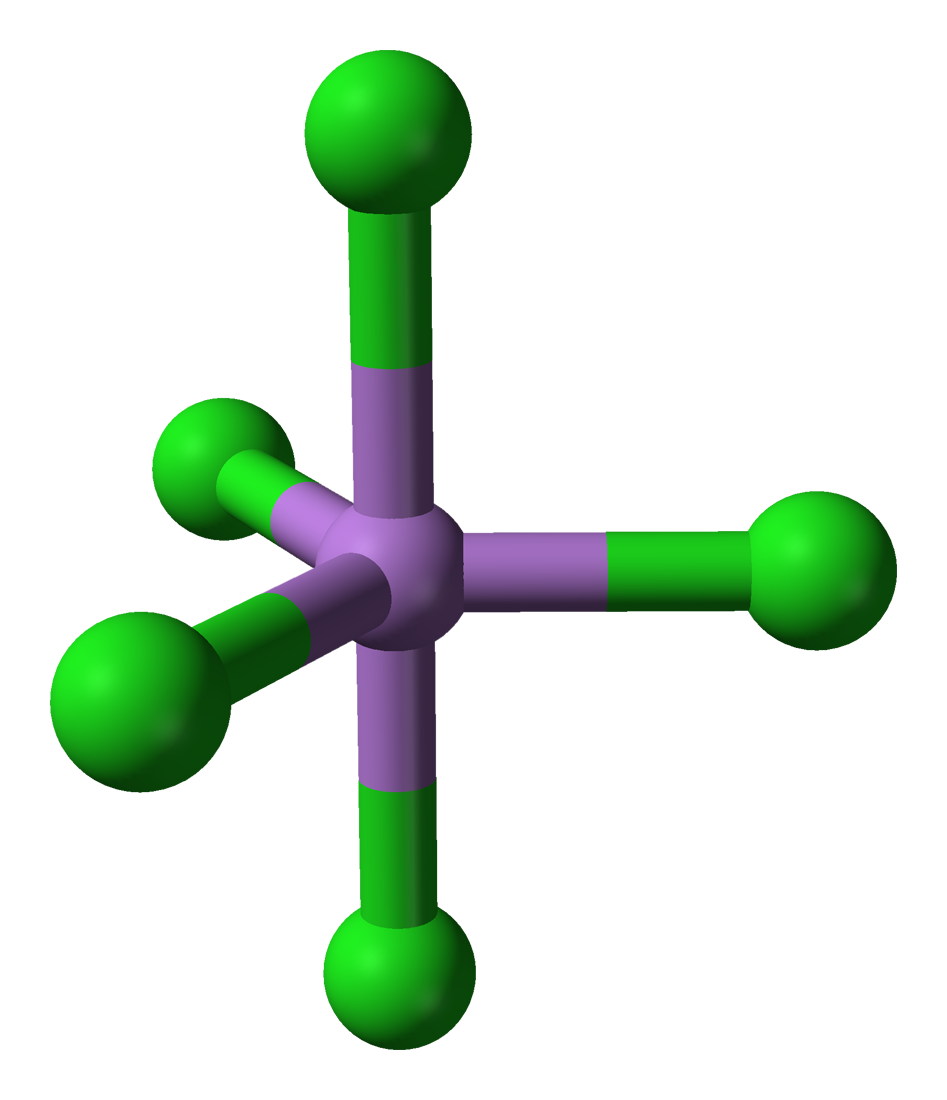
- Ball-and-stick model of a single molecule

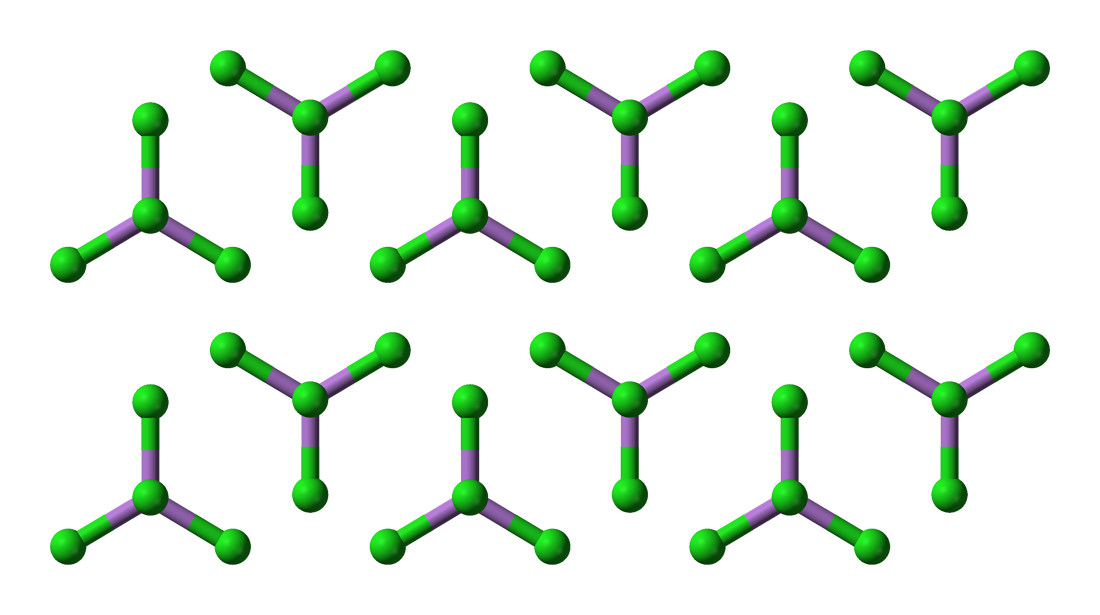
- Ball-and-stick model of the crystal structure

Names
- IUPAC name arsenic pentachloride
- Other names arsenic(v) chloride

Identifiers
CAS Number	22441-45-8
3D model (JSmol)	Interactive image
ChemSpider	30780127
PubChem CID	13643880
CompTox Dashboard (EPA)	DTXSID60545765
- InChI: InChI=1S/AsCl5/c2-1(3,4,5)6 Key: ZSRZHCIWJJKHAU-UHFFFAOYSA-N
- SMILES: Cl[As](Cl)(Cl)(Cl)Cl

Properties
Chemical formula	AsCl_{5}
Molar mass	252.1866 g/mol
Melting point	−50 °C (−58 °F; 223 K)

Hazards
- GHS labelling
Pictograms	(GHS08: Health hazard)
Signal word	Danger
Hazard statements	H280, H350, H361, H370, H372
Precautionary statements	P201, P202, P260, P264, P270, P281, P307+P311, P308+P313, P314, P321, P405, P410+P403, P501
- NIOSH (US health exposure limits)
PEL (Permissible)	[1910.1018] TWA 0.010 mg/m^{3}
REL (Recommended)	Ca C 0.002 mg/m^{3} [15-minute]
IDLH (Immediate danger)	Ca [5 mg/m^{3} (as As)]

Structure
Molecular shape	Trigonal Bipyramidal (D_{3h})

Related compounds
Related group 5 chlorides	Phosphorus pentachloride Antimony pentachloride
Related compounds	Arsenic pentafluoride Arsenic trichloride Arsenic pentoxide
- Except where otherwise noted, data are given for materials in their standard state (at 25 °C [77 °F], 100 kPa). verify (what is ?) Infobox references

Arsenic pentachloride is a chemical compound of arsenic and chlorine with the formula AsCl_{5}. This compound was first prepared in 1976 through the UV irradiation of arsenic trichloride, AsCl_{3}, in liquid chlorine at −105 °C. AsCl_{5} decomposes at around −50 °C. The structure of the solid was finally determined in 2001. AsCl_{5} is similar to phosphorus pentachloride, PCl_{5} in having a trigonal bipyramidal structure where the equatorial bonds are shorter than the axial bonds (As-Cl_{eq} = 210.6 pm, 211.9 pm; As-Cl_{ax}= 220.7 pm).

The pentachlorides of the elements above and below arsenic in group 15, phosphorus pentachloride and antimony pentachloride are much more stable and the instability of AsCl_{5} appears anomalous. The cause is believed to be due to incomplete shielding of the nucleus in the 4p elements following the first transition series (i.e. gallium, germanium, arsenic, selenium, bromine, and krypton) which leads to stabilisation of their 4s electrons making them less available for bonding. This effect has been termed the d-block contraction and is similar to the f-block contraction normally termed the lanthanide contraction.

Although AsCl_{5} is quite unstable, adducts with phosphorus pentachloride and trimethylphosphine oxide are stable under standard conditions.
