= Arsenic pentafluoride =

Structural formula
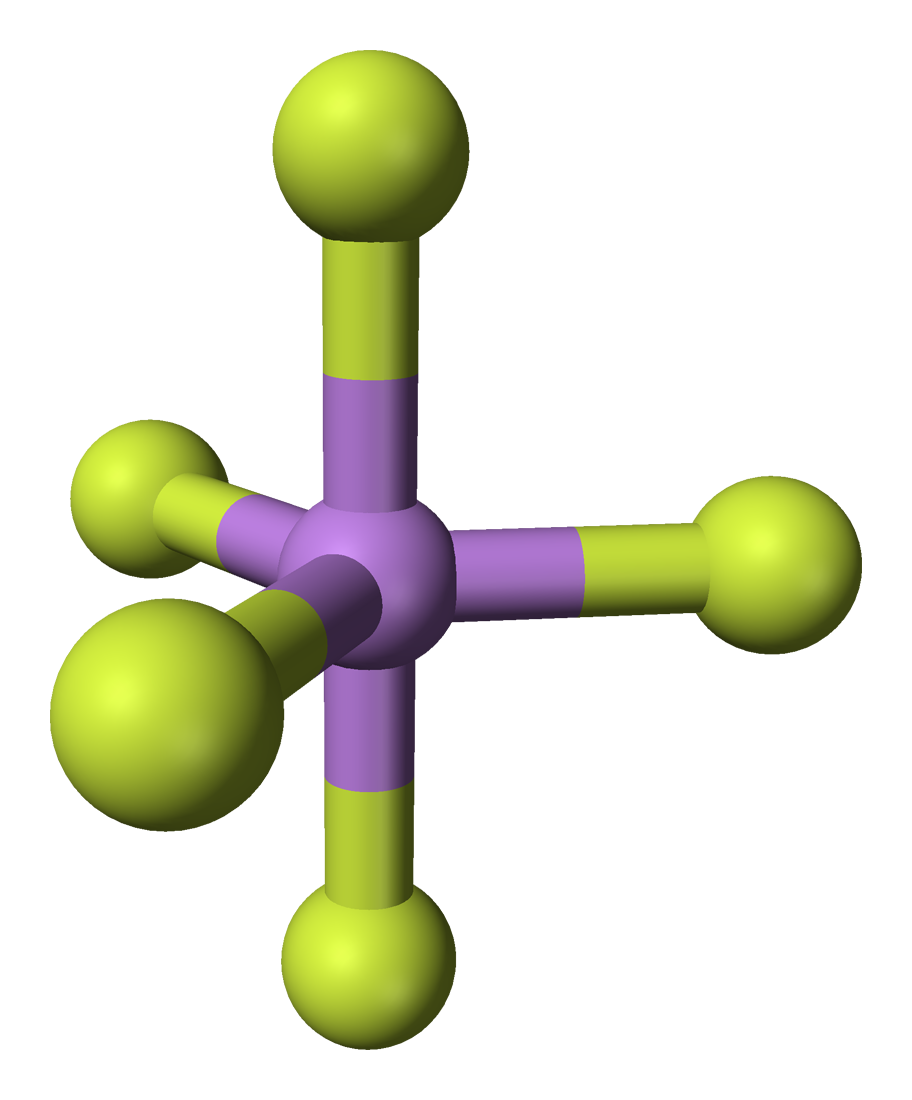
Ball-and-stick model

Names
- IUPAC name Arsenic pentafluoride
- Other names Arsenic(V) fluoride, Arsorane, pentafluoro-

Identifiers
CAS Number	7784-36-3
3D model (JSmol)	Interactive image
ChEBI	CHEBI:30530
ChemSpider	74203
ECHA InfoCard	100.029.146
PubChem CID	82223
UNII	I54752Q0OJ
CompTox Dashboard (EPA)	DTXSID4064842
- InChI: InChI=1S/AsF5/c2-1(3,4,5)6 Key: YBGKQGSCGDNZIB-UHFFFAOYSA-N; InChI=1/AsF5/c2-1(3,4,5)6 Key: YBGKQGSCGDNZIB-UHFFFAOYAA
- SMILES: F[As](F)(F)(F)F

Properties
Chemical formula	AsF_{5}
Molar mass	169.913611 g·mol^{−1}
Appearance	colorless gas
Density	2.138 kg/m^{3} (g/L)
Melting point	−79.8 ˚C
Boiling point	−52.8 ˚C
Solubility	Ethanol, Dimethylether, Benzene

Hazards
- GHS labelling
Pictograms	(GHS06: Toxic) (GHS07: Exclamation mark) (GHS08: Health hazard)
Signal word	Danger
Hazard statements	H319, H330, H350, H361, H370, H372
Precautionary statements	P201, P202, P260, P264, P270, P280, P281, P305+P351+P338, P307+P311, P308+P313, P314, P321, P337+P313, P405, P410+P403, P501
NFPA 704 (fire diamond)	4 0 1 W; OX
- NIOSH (US health exposure limits)
PEL (Permissible)	[1910.1018] TWA 0.010 mg/m^{3}
REL (Recommended)	Ca C 0.002 mg/m^{3} [15-minute]
IDLH (Immediate danger)	Ca [5 mg/m^{3} (as As)]

Related compounds
Related group 5 fluorides	Phosphorus pentafluoride Antimony pentafluoride Bismuth pentafluoride
Related compounds	Arsenic pentachloride Arsenic trifluoride Arsenic pentoxide
- Except where otherwise noted, data are given for materials in their standard state (at 25 °C [77 °F], 100 kPa). verify (what is ?) Infobox references

Arsenic pentafluoride is a chemical compound of arsenic and fluorine. It is a toxic, colorless gas. The oxidation state of arsenic is +5.

== Synthesis ==
Arsenic pentafluoride can be prepared by direct combination of arsenic and fluorine:

2As + 5F_{2} → 2AsF_{5}

It can also be prepared by the reaction of arsenic trifluoride and fluorine:

AsF_{3} + F_{2} → AsF_{5}

or the addition of fluorine to arsenic pentoxide or arsenic trioxide.

2As_{2}O_{5} + 10F_{2} → 4AsF_{5} + 5O_{2}
2As_{2}O_{3} + 10F_{2} → 4AsF_{5} + 3O_{2}

== Properties ==
Arsenic pentafluoride is a colourless gas and has a trigonal bipyramidal structure. In the solid state the axial As−F bond lengths are 171.9 pm and the equatorial 166.8 pm. Its point group is D3h.

== Reactions ==
Arsenic pentafluoride forms halide complexes and is a powerful fluoride acceptor. An example is the reaction with sulfur tetrafluoride, forming an ionic hexafluoroarsenate complex.

AsF_{5} + SF_{4} → SF_{3}^{+} + AsF_{6}^{−}

== See also ==
- List of highly toxic gases
