= Arsenic trifluoride =

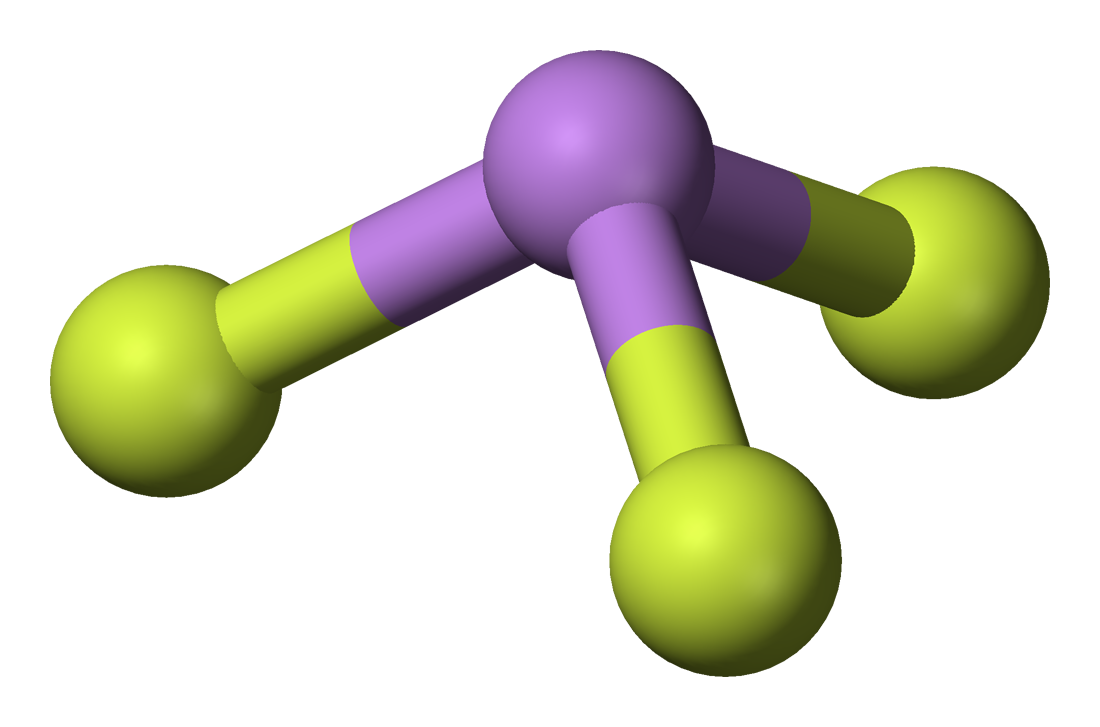

Names
- IUPAC name Arsenic(III) fluoride
- Other names Arsenic trifluoride, trifluoroarsane, TL-156

Identifiers
| CAS Number | 7784-35-2 |
| 3D model (JSmol) | Interactive image |
| ChemSpider | 22975 |
| ECHA InfoCard | 100.029.145 |
| EC Number | 232-060-0 |
| PubChem CID | 24571 |
| RTECS number | CG5775000 |
| UNII | R4I21S44T9 |
| CompTox Dashboard (EPA) | DTXSID9064841 |
- InChI: InChI=1S/AsF3/c2-1(3)4 Key: JCMGUODNZMETBM-UHFFFAOYSA-N; InChI=1/AsF3/c2-1(3)4 Key: JCMGUODNZMETBM-UHFFFAOYAJ
- SMILES: F[As](F)F

Properties
| Chemical formula | AsF_{3} |
| Molar mass | 131.9168 g/mol |
| Appearance | colorless oily liquid |
| Density | 2.666 g/cm^{3} (0 °C) |
| Melting point | −8.5 °C (16.7 °F; 264.6 K) |
| Boiling point | 60.4 °C (140.7 °F; 333.5 K) |
| Solubility in water | decomposes |
| Solubility | soluble in alcohol, ether, benzene and ammonia solution |

Hazards
- Occupational safety and health (OHS/OSH)
| Main hazards | Toxic, corrosive |
- GHS labelling
| Pictograms | (GHS06: Toxic) |
| Signal word | Danger |
| Hazard statements | H301, H311, H331 |
| Precautionary statements | P261, P264, P270, P271, P280, P301+P310, P302+P352, P304+P340, P311, P312, P321, P322, P330, P361, P363, P403+P233, P405, P501 |
- NIOSH (US health exposure limits)
| PEL (Permissible) | [1910.1018] TWA 0.010 mg/m^{3} |
| REL (Recommended) | Ca C 0.002 mg/m^{3} [15-minute] |
| IDLH (Immediate danger) | Ca [5 mg/m^{3} (as As)] |

Thermochemistry
| Std enthalpy of formation (Δ_{f}H^{⦵}_{298}) | −821.3 kJ/mol |
- Except where otherwise noted, data are given for materials in their standard state (at 25 °C [77 °F], 100 kPa). verify (what is ?) Infobox references

Arsenic trifluoride is a chemical compound of arsenic and fluorine with the chemical formula AsF_{3}. It is a colorless liquid which reacts readily with water. Like other inorganic arsenic compounds, it is highly toxic.

== Preparation and properties ==
It can be prepared by treating arsenic trioxide with hydrogen fluoride:

As_{2}O_{3} + 6 HX → 2 AsX_{3} + 3 H_{2}O (X = F, Cl)

6HF + As_{2}O_{3} → 2AsF_{3} + 3H_{2}O

It has a pyramidal molecular structure in the gas phase which is also present in the solid. In the gas phase the As-F bond length is 170.6 pm and the F-As-F bond angle 96.2°.

Arsenic trifluoride is used as a fluorinating agent for the conversion of non-metal chlorides to fluorides, in this respect it is less reactive than SbF_{3}.

Salts containing AsF_{4}^{−} anion can be prepared for example CsAsF_{4}. the potassium salt KAs_{2}F_{7} prepared from KF and AsF_{3} contains AsF_{4}^{−} and AsF_{3} molecules with evidence of interaction between the AsF_{3} molecule and the anion.

AsF_{3} reacts with SbF_{5}. The product obtained could be described as the ionic compound AsF_{2}^{+} SbF_{6}^{−}. However, the authors conclude the formed product cannot be viewed only as an ionic compound nor entirely as the neutral adduct AsF_{3}SbF_{5}. The crystal structure displays characteristics of both an ionic pair, and a neutral adduct, taking the middle ground in between both models.
