= Antimony pentafluoride =

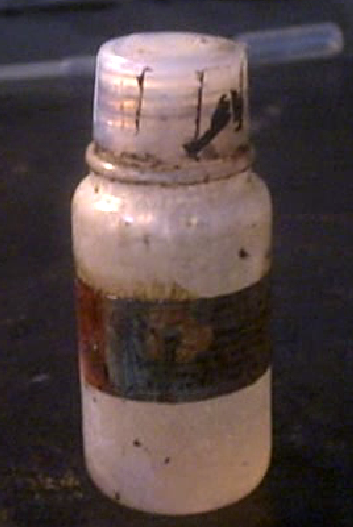
- Antimony pentafluoride.

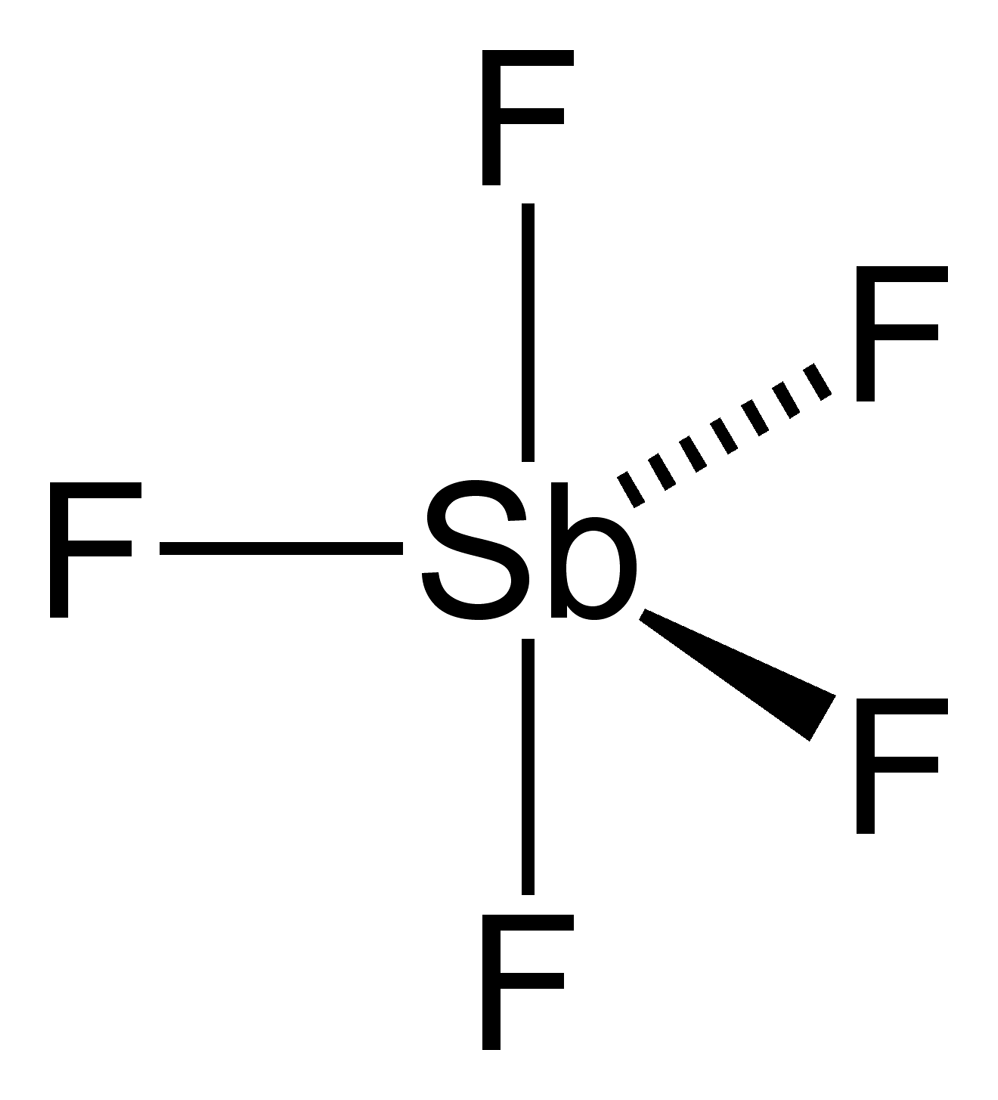
Antimony pentafluoride
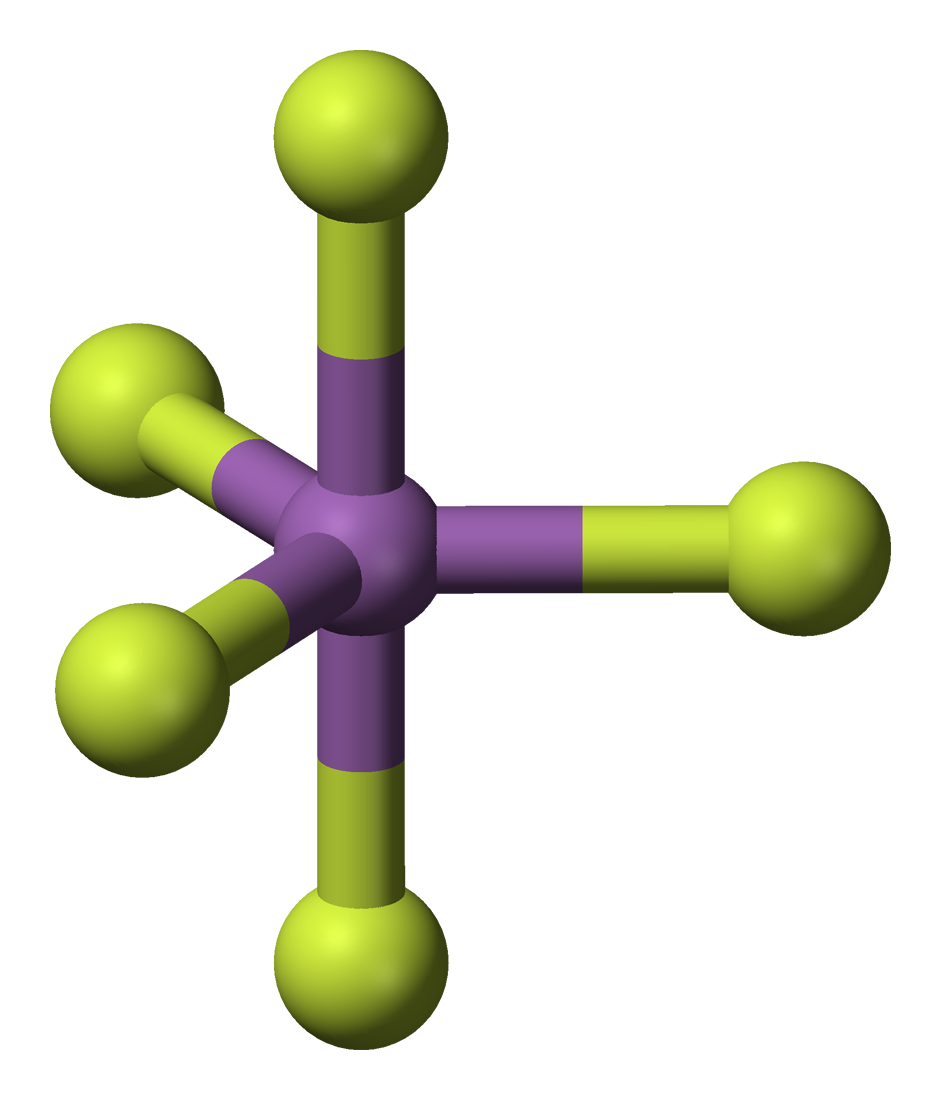
Antimony pentafluoride

Names
- IUPAC name Antimony pentafluoride
- Systematic IUPAC name Pentafluoro-λ^{5}-stibane
- Other names Antimony(V) fluoride pentafluoridoantimony

Identifiers
CAS Number	7783-70-2
3D model (JSmol)	Interactive image
ChEBI	CHEBI:193146
ChemSpider	22963
ECHA InfoCard	100.029.110
EC Number	232-021-8
PubChem CID	24557
RTECS number	CC5800000
UNII	6C93R71VRF
UN number	1732
CompTox Dashboard (EPA)	DTXSID00893075
- InChI: InChI=1S/5FH.Sb/h5*1H;/q;;;;;+5/p-5 Key: VBVBHWZYQGJZLR-UHFFFAOYSA-I; InChI=1/5FH.Sb/h5*1H;/q;;;;;+5/p-5/rF5Sb/c1-6(2,3,4)5 Key: VBVBHWZYQGJZLR-NMXCDXEPAW
- SMILES: F[Sb](F)(F)(F)F

Properties
Chemical formula	SbF_{5}
Molar mass	216.74 g/mol
Appearance	colorless oily, viscous liquid hygroscopic
Odor	pungent, sharp
Density	2.99 g/cm^{3}
Melting point	8.3 °C (46.9 °F; 281.4 K)
Boiling point	149.5 °C (301.1 °F; 422.6 K)
Solubility in water	Reacts
Solubility	soluble in KF, liquid SO_{2}

Hazards
- Occupational safety and health (OHS/OSH)
Main hazards	Extremely toxic, corrosive, hazardous to health. Releases hydrofluoric acid upon contact with water and biological tissues. Strong oxidizing agent.
- GHS labelling
Pictograms	(GHS06: Toxic) (GHS05: Corrosive) (GHS07: Exclamation mark) (GHS09: Environmental hazard) (GHS03: Oxidizing) (GHS08: Health hazard)
Signal word	Danger
Hazard statements	H300+H310+H330, H314, H411, H412
Precautionary statements	P260, P264, P270, P271, P273, P280, P301+P312, P301+P330+P331, P303+P361+P353, P304+P312, P304+P340, P305+P351+P338, P310, P312, P321, P330, P363, P391, P405, P501
NFPA 704 (fire diamond)	4 0 3 W; OX
Flash point	noncombustible
- Lethal dose or concentration (LD, LC)
LD_{50} (median dose)	270 mg/kg (mouse, subcutaneous)
LC_{50} (median concentration)	270 mg/m^{3} or 30 ppm (mouse, inhalation)
LC_{Lo} (lowest published)	15 mg/m^{3} or 1.69 ppm (rat, inhalation, 2 hours)
- NIOSH (US health exposure limits)
PEL (Permissible)	TWA 0.5 mg/m^{3} or 0.05 ppm (as Sb)
REL (Recommended)	TWA 0.5 mg/m^{3} or 0.05 ppm (as Sb)
IDLH (Immediate danger)	50 mg/m^{3} (5 ppm)
Safety data sheet (SDS)	ICSC 0220

Related compounds
Other anions	Antimony pentachloride
Other cations	Phosphorus pentafluoride Arsenic pentafluoride Bismuth pentafluoride
Related compounds	Antimony trifluoride
- Except where otherwise noted, data are given for materials in their standard state (at 25 °C [77 °F], 100 kPa). verify (what is ?) Infobox references

Antimony pentafluoride is the inorganic compound with the formula SbF_{5}. This colorless, viscous liquid is a strong Lewis acid and a component of the superacid fluoroantimonic acid, formed upon mixing liquid HF with liquid SbF_{5} in a 1:1 molar ratio. It is notable for its strong Lewis acidity and the ability to react with almost all known compounds.

== Preparation ==
Antimony pentafluoride is prepared by the reaction of antimony pentachloride with anhydrous hydrogen fluoride:

SbCl_{5} + 5 HF → SbF_{5} + 5 HCl

It can also be prepared from antimony trifluoride and fluorine.

== Structure and chemical reactions ==
In the gas phase, SbF_{5} adopts a trigonal bipyramidal structure of D_{3h} point group symmetry (see picture). The material adopts a more complicated structure in the liquid and solid states. The liquid contains polymers wherein each Sb is octahedral, the structure being described with the formula [SbF_{4}(μ-F)_{2}]_{n} ((μ-F) denotes the fact that fluoride centres bridge two Sb centers). The crystalline material is a tetramer, meaning that it has the formula [SbF_{4}(μ-F)]_{4}. The Sb–F bonds are 2.02 Å within the eight-membered Sb_{4}F_{4} ring; the remaining fluoride ligands radiating from the four Sb centers are shorter at 1.82 Å. The related species PF_{5} and AsF_{5} are monomeric in the solid and liquid states, probably due to the smaller sizes of the central atom, which limits their coordination number. BiF_{5} is a polymer.

Antimony pentafluoride is a very strong oxidizing agent. Phosphorus burns on contact with it.

SbF_{5} increases the oxidizing power of fluorine, making it able to oxidize oxygen:

2 SbF_{5} + F_{2} + 2 O_{2} → 2 [O_{2}]^{+}[SbF_{6}]^{−}
SbF_{5} has also been used in the first discovered chemical reaction that produces fluorine gas from fluoride compounds:
4 SbF_{5} + 2 K_{2}MnF_{6} → 4 KSbF_{6} + 2 MnF_{3} + F_{2}

The driving force for this reaction is the high affinity of SbF_{5} for F^{−}, which is the same property that recommends the use of SbF_{5} to generate superacids.

=== Hexafluoroantimonate ===
SbF_{5} is a strong Lewis acid, exceptionally so toward sources of F^{−} to give the very stable anion [SbF_{6}]^{−}, called hexafluoroantimonate. It is the conjugate base of the superacid fluoroantimonic acid. [SbF_{6}]^{−} is a weakly coordinating anion akin to PF_{6}^{−}. Although it is only weakly basic, [SbF_{6}]^{−} does react with additional SbF_{5} to give a centrosymmetric adduct:

SbF_{5} + [SbF_{6}]^{−} → [Sb_{2}F_{11}]^{−}

The [Sb_{2}F_{11}]^{−} anion is one of the ions found in HF/SbF_{5} Mixture.

== Safety ==
SbF_{5} is highly corrosive to the skin and the eyes. It is extremely toxic and hazardous to health. Its lethal dose (LD_{50}) is reported to be 270 mg/kg (mouse, subcutaneous) with lowest concentration (LC_{Lo}) of 15 mg/m^{3} or 1.69 ppm (rat, inhalation, 2 hours). Occupational exposure limit set by NIOSH stands at 50 mg/m^{3} (5 ppm). It is considered to be Immediately dangerous to life and health at this concentration. Other than that, SbF_{5} reacts violently with water along with many other compounds, often releasing dangerous hydrogen fluoride. It is a very strong oxidizer.
