= Antimony pentachloride =

Chemical compound

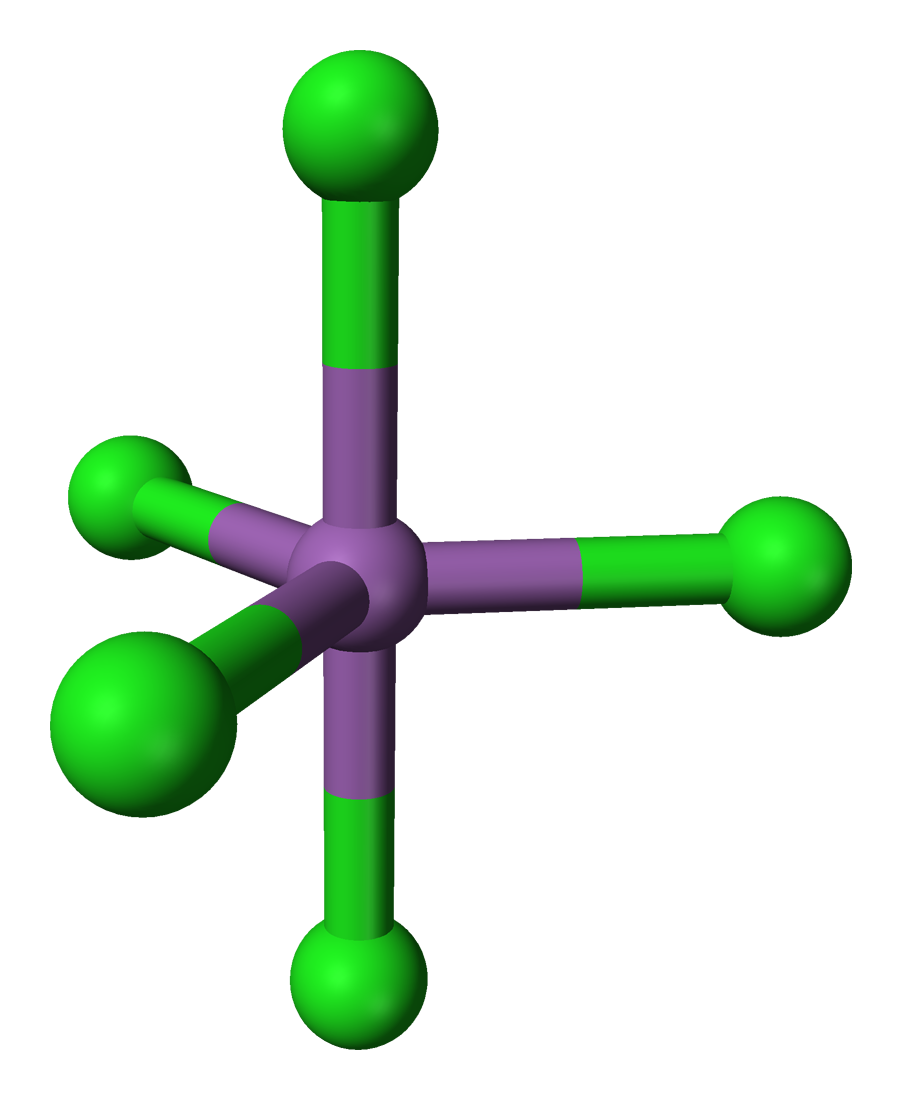
Antimony pentachloride
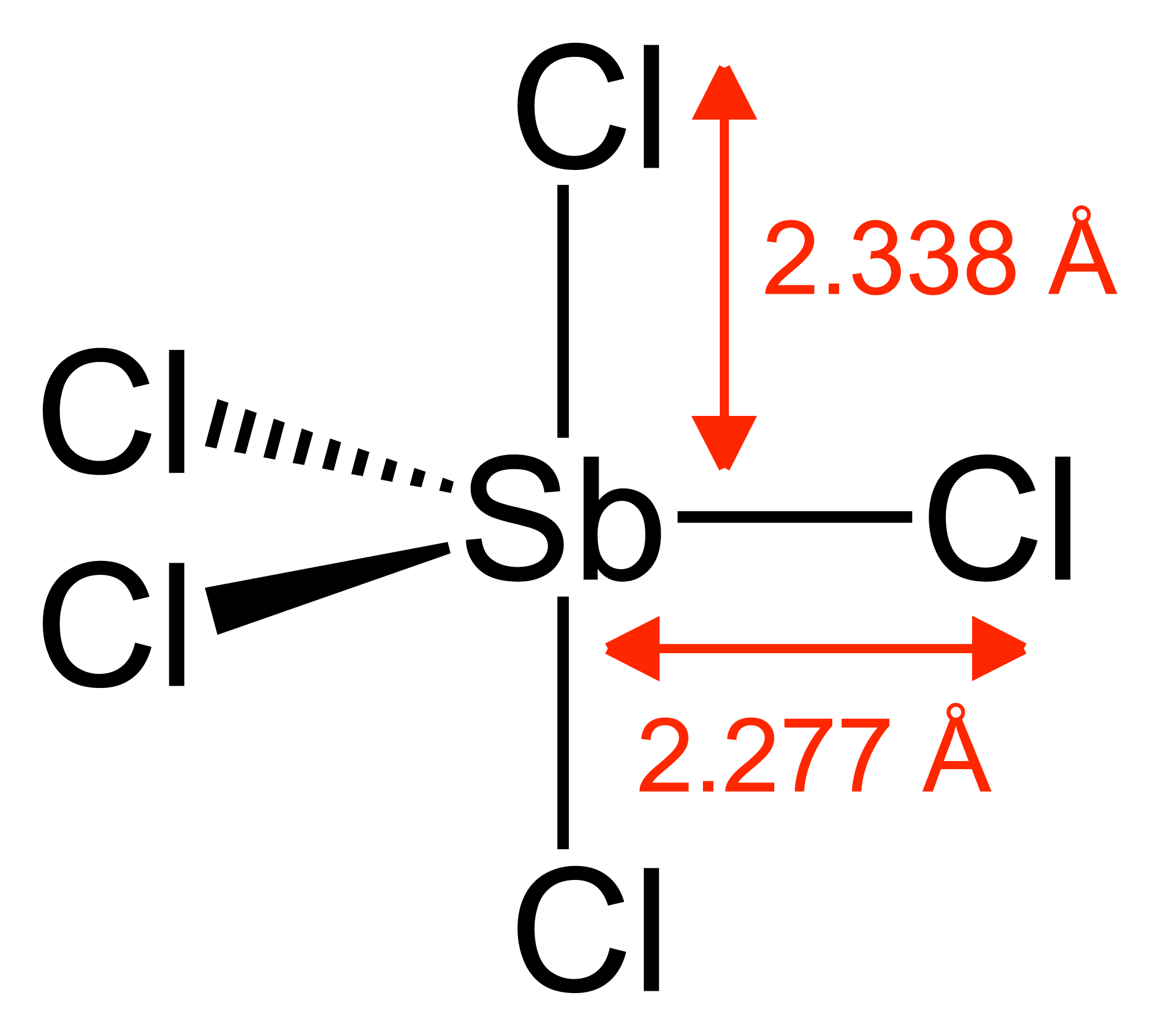

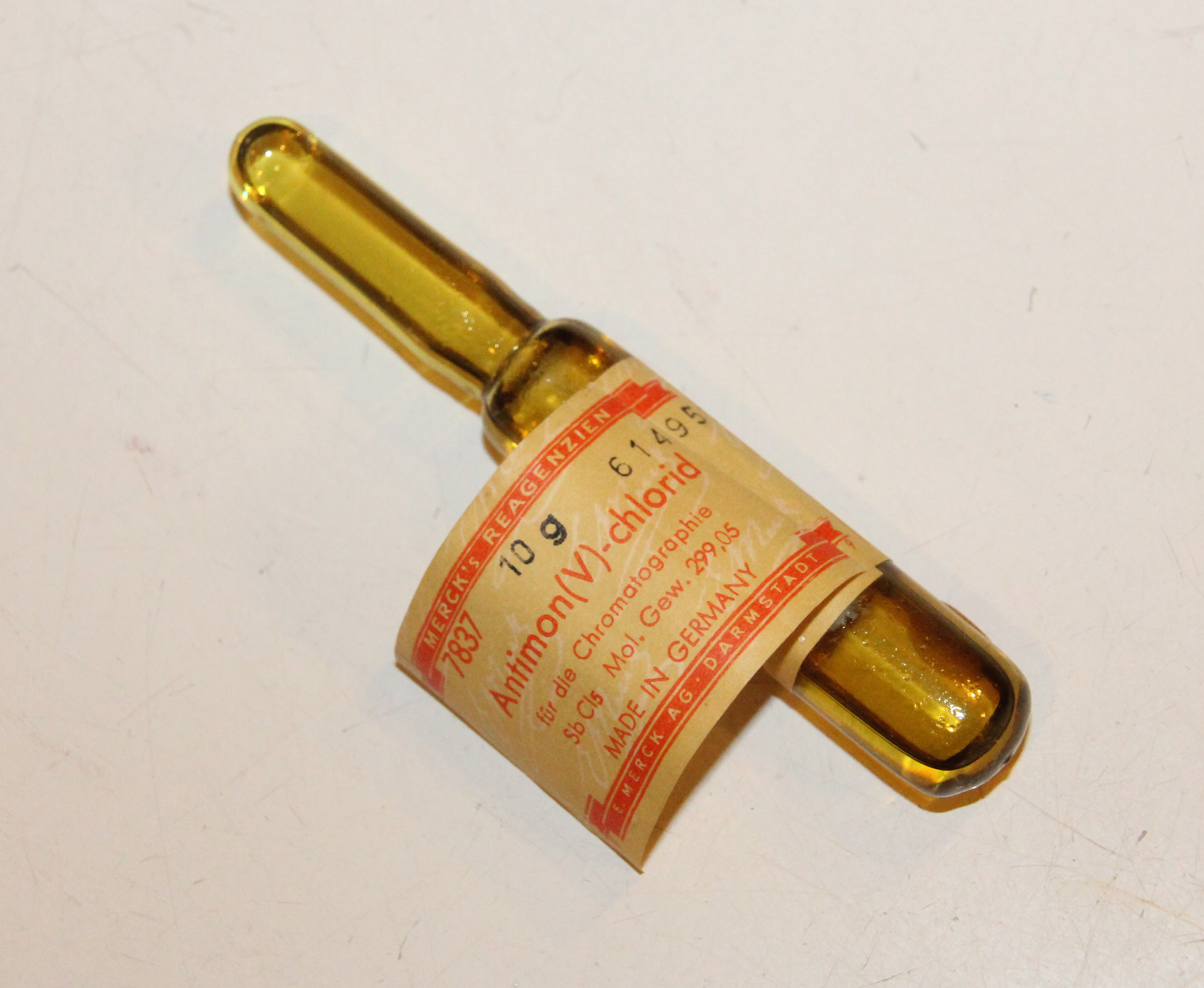

Names
- IUPAC names Antimony pentachloride Antimony(V) chloride
- Other names Antimonic chloride Antimony perchloride

Identifiers
CAS Number	7647-18-9
3D model (JSmol)	Interactive image; Interactive image
ChemSpider	10613049
ECHA InfoCard	100.028.729
EC Number	231-601-8
PubChem CID	24294
RTECS number	CC5075000
UNII	0S9308207L
CompTox Dashboard (EPA)	DTXSID30893043
- InChI: InChI=1S/5ClH.Sb/h5*1H;/q;;;;;+3/p-5 Key: PZVOXSCNPLCIRA-UHFFFAOYSA-I; InChI=1/5ClH.Sb.3H/h5*1H;;;;/q;;;;;+3;;;/p-5/r5ClH.H3Sb/h5*1H;1H3/q;;;;;+3/p-5 Key: KUGFODPTKMDJNG-MEZDTJOHAL; InChI=1/5ClH.Sb/h5*1H;/q;;;;;+3/p-5 Key: PZVOXSCNPLCIRA-AACRGIKGAS
- SMILES: [Cl-].[Cl-].[Cl-].[Cl-].[Cl-].[SbH3+3]; [SbH3+3].[Cl-].[Cl-].[Cl-].[Cl-].[Cl-]

Properties
Chemical formula	Cl_{5}Sb
Molar mass	299.01 g·mol^{−1}
Appearance	colorless or reddish-yellow (fuming) liquid, oily
Odor	pungent, offensive
Density	2.336 g/cm^{3} (20 °C); 2.36 g/cm^{3} (25 °C)
Melting point	2.8 °C (37.0 °F; 275.9 K)
Boiling point	140 °C (284 °F; 413 K) decomposes from 106 °C; 79 °C (174 °F; 352 K) at 22 mmHg (2.9 kPa); 92 °C (198 °F; 365 K) at 30 mmHg (4.0 kPa)
Solubility in water	reacts
Solubility	soluble in alcohol, HCl, tartaric acid, CHCl_{3}, CS_{2}, CCl_{4}
Solubility in selenium(IV) oxychloride	62.97 g/100 g (25 °C)
Vapor pressure	0.16 kPa (25 °C); 4 kPa (40 °C); 7.7 kPa (100 °C)
Magnetic susceptibility (χ)	−120.0·10^{−6} cm^{3}/mol
Refractive index (n_{D})	1.59255
Viscosity	2.034 cP (29.4 °C); 1.91 cP (35 °C)

Structure
Molecular shape	Trigonal bipyramidal
Dipole moment	0 D

Thermochemistry
Heat capacity (C)	120.9 J/mol·K (gas)
Std molar entropy (S^{⦵}_{298})	295 J/mol·K
Std enthalpy of formation (Δ_{f}H^{⦵}_{298})	−437.2 kJ/mol
Gibbs free energy (Δ_{f}G^{⦵})	−345.35 kJ/mol

Hazards
- Occupational safety and health (OHS/OSH)
Inhalation hazards	Toxic
- GHS labelling
Pictograms	(GHS05: Corrosive) (GHS09: Environmental hazard) (GHS03: Oxidizing) (GHS06: Toxic)
Signal word	Danger
Hazard statements	H314, H411
Precautionary statements	P273, P280, P305+P351+P338, P310
NFPA 704 (fire diamond)	4 0 2 W; OX
Flash point	77 °C (171 °F; 350 K)
- Lethal dose or concentration (LD, LC)
LD_{50} (median dose)	1115 mg/kg, (rat, oral)
- NIOSH (US health exposure limits)
PEL (Permissible)	TWA 0.5 mg/m^{3} (as Sb)
REL (Recommended)	TWA 0.5 mg/m^{3} (as Sb)

Related compounds
Other anions	Antimony pentafluoride
Other cations	Phosphorus pentachloride
Related compounds	Antimony trichloride
- Except where otherwise noted, data are given for materials in their standard state (at 25 °C [77 °F], 100 kPa). verify (what is ?) Infobox references

Antimony pentachloride is a chemical compound with the formula SbCl_{5}. It is a colourless oil, but typical samples are yellowish due to dissolved chlorine. Owing to its tendency to hydrolyse to hydrochloric acid, SbCl_{5} is a highly corrosive substance and must be stored in glass or PTFE containers.

== Preparation and structure ==
Antimony pentachloride is prepared by passing chlorine gas into molten antimony trichloride:

SbCl_{3} + Cl_{2} → SbCl_{5}

Gaseous SbCl_{5} has a trigonal bipyramidal structure.

== Reactions ==
This compounds reacts with water to form antimony pentoxide and hydrochloric acid:

2 SbCl_{5} + 5 H_{2}O → Sb_{2}O_{5} + 10 HCl

The mono- and tetrahydrates are known, SbCl_{5}·H_{2}O and SbCl_{5}·4H_{2}O.

This compound forms adducts with many Lewis bases. SbCl_{5} is a soft Lewis acid and its ECW model parameters are E_{A} = 3.64 and C_{A} = 10.42. It is used as the standard Lewis acid in the Gutmann scale of Lewis basicity.

It is also a strong oxidizing agent. For example aromatic ethers are oxidized to their radical cations according to the following stoichiometry:

3 SbCl_{5} + 2 ArH → 2 (ArH^{+})(SbCl_{6}^{−}) + SbCl_{3}

== Applications ==
Antimony pentachloride is used as a polymerization catalyst and for the chlorination of organic compounds.

== Precautions ==
Antimony pentachloride is a highly corrosive substance that should be stored away from heat and moisture. It is a chlorinating agent and, in the presence of moisture, it releases hydrogen chloride gas. Because of this, it may etch even stainless-steel tools (such as needles), if handled in a moist atmosphere. It should not be handled with non-fluorinated plastics (such as plastic syringes, plastic septa, or needles with plastic fittings), since it melts and carbonizes plastic materials.
