= Phosphorus oxoacids =

Any acidic compound made of phosphorous, oxygen, and hydrogen

In chemistry, phosphorus oxoacid (or phosphorus acid) is a generic name for any acid whose molecule consists of atoms of phosphorus, oxygen, and hydrogen. There is a potentially infinite number of such compounds. Some of them are unstable and have not been isolated, but the derived anions and organic groups are present in stable salts and esters. The most important ones—in biology, geology, industry, and chemical research—are the phosphoric acids, whose esters and salts are the phosphates.

In general, any hydrogen atom bonded to an oxygen atom is acidic, meaning that the –OH group can lose a proton H^{+} leaving a negatively charged –O^{−} group and thus turning the acid into a phosphorus oxoanion. Each additional proton lost has an associated acid dissociation constant K_{a1}, K_{a2} K_{a3}, ..., often expressed by its cologarithm (pK_{a1}, pK_{a2}, pK_{a3}, ...). Hydrogen atoms bonded directly to phosphorus are generally not acidic.

== Classification ==
The phosphorus oxoacids can be classified by the oxidation state(s) of the phosphorus atom(s), which may vary from +1 to +5. The oxygen atoms are usually in oxidation state −2, but may be in state −1 if the molecule includes peroxide groups.

=== Oxidation state +1 ===
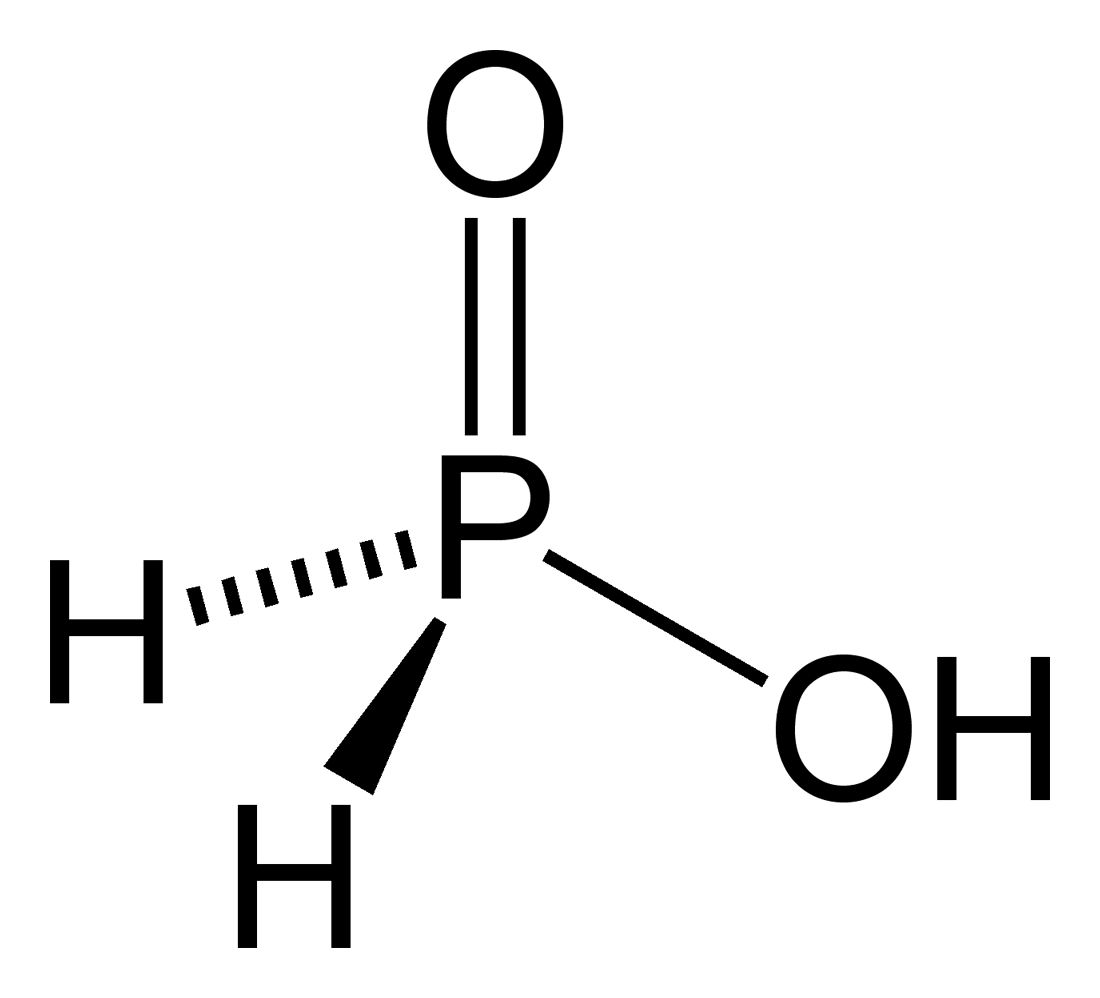
Hypophosphorous acid

- Hypophosphorous acid (or phosphinic acid), H_{3}PO_{2} (or H_{2}PO(OH)), a monoprotic acid (meaning that only one of the hydrogen atoms is acidic). Its salts and esters are called hypophosphites or phosphinates.

=== Oxidation state +3 ===
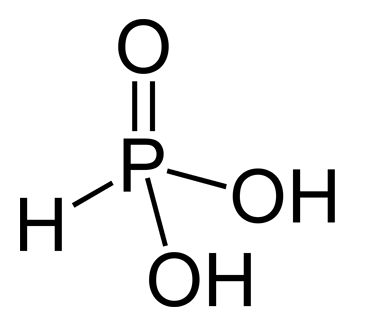
Phosphorous acid

- Phosphorous acid (or phosphonic acid), H_{3}PO_{3} (or HPO(OH)_{2}), a diprotic acid (with only two acidic hydrogens). Its salts and esters are called phosphites or phosphonates.

=== Oxidation state +4 ===
Hypophosphoric acid

- Hypophosphoric acid, H_{4}P_{2}O_{6} (or (HO)_{2}P–P(OH)_{2}). All four hydrogens are acidic. Its salts and esters are hypophosphates.

=== Oxidation state +5 ===
The most important members of this group are the phosphoric acids, where each phosphorus atom bonded to four oxygen atoms, one of them through a double bond, arranged as the corners of a tetrahedron. Two or more of these PO_{4} tetrahedra may be connected by shared single-bonded oxygens, forming linear or branched chains, cycles, or more complex structures. The single-bonded oxygen atoms that are not shared are completed with acidic hydrogen atoms. Their generic formula is H_{n−x+2}P_{n}O_{3n−x+1}, where n is the number of phosphorus atoms and x is the number of fundamental cycles in the molecule's structure.

These acids, and their esters and salts ("phosphates") include some of the best-known and most important compounds of phosphorus.

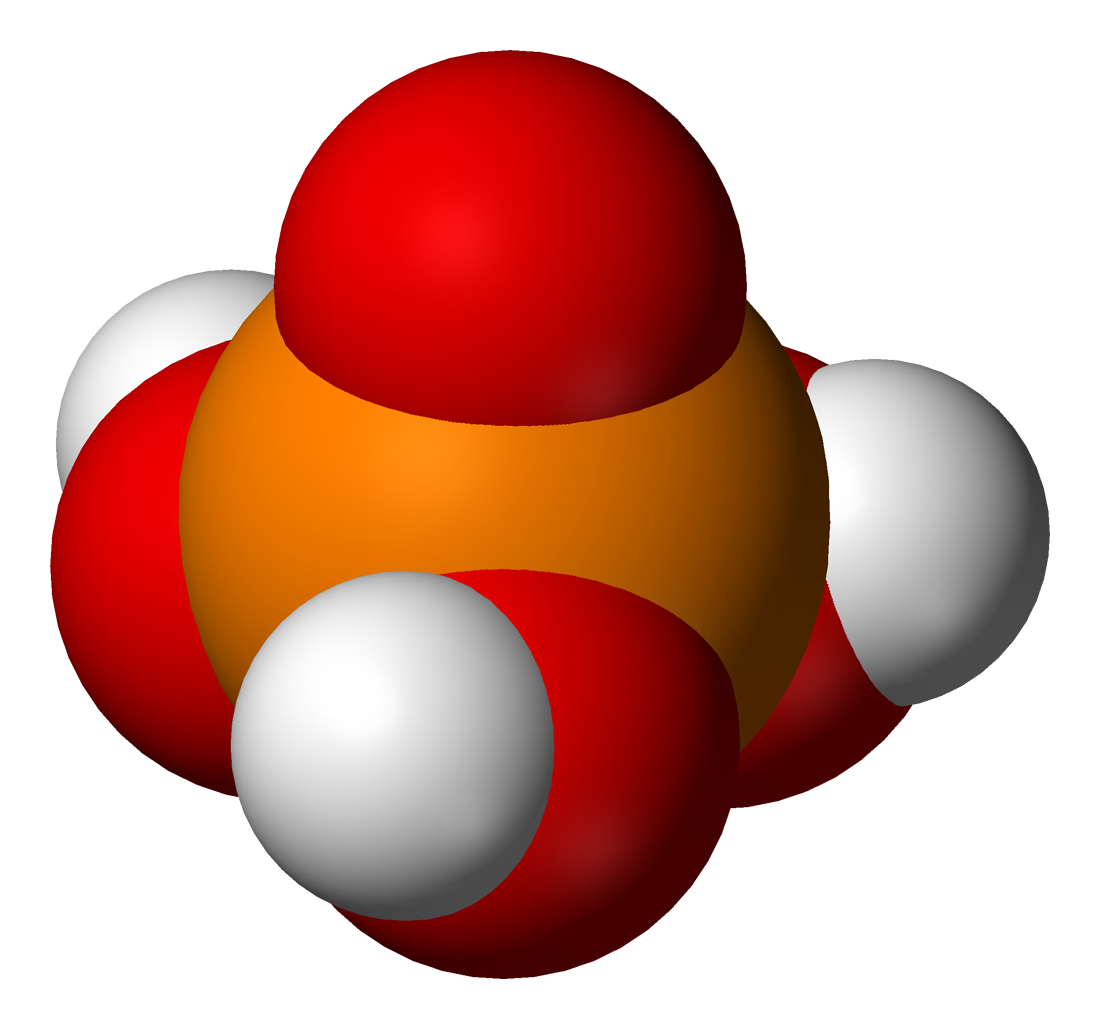
Orthophosphoric acid, H_{3}PO_{4}.

The simplest member of this class is:

- Phosphoric acid proper (also called orthophosphoric acid or monophosphoric acid), H_{3}PO_{4} (or OP(OH)_{3}), a triprotic acid. It forms orthophosphate salt and esters, commonly called phosphates.

The smallest compounds of this class with two or more phosphorus atoms are called "oligophosphoric acids", and the larger ones, with linear –P–O– backbones, are "polyphosphoric acids"; with no definite separation between the two. Some of the most important members are:

- Pyrophosphoric acid, H_{4}P_{2}O_{7} (or (HO)_{2}PO–O–PO(OH)_{2}), with four acid hydrogens. Forms pyrophosphates.
- Triphosphoric acid (or tripolyphosphoric acid), H_{5}P_{3}O_{10} (or (HO)_{2}P–O–P(OH)–O–P(OH)_{2}), with five acidic hydrogens. Forms triphosphates or tripolyphosphates.
- Tetraphosphoric acid, H_{6}P_{4}O_{13} (or (HO)_{2}P(–O–P(OH))_{2}–O–P(OH)_{2}), with six acidic hydrogens. Forms tetraphosphates.

The backbone may be branched, as in:

- Triphosphono phosphoric acid, H_{6}P_{4}O_{13} or P(O)(–OP(O)(OH)_{2})_{3}, a branched isomer of tetrapolyphosphoric acid.

The PO_{4} tetrahedra may be connected to form closed –P–O– chains, as in:

- Trimetaphosphoric acid (or cyclotriphosphoric acid), H_{3}P_{3}O_{9} (or (HPO_{3})_{3}, (–P(O)(OH)–O–)_{3}), a cyclic molecule with three acidic hydrogens. Forms the trimetaphosphate salts and esters.

Metaphosphoric acid is a general term for phosphoric acids with a single cycle, (–P(O)(OH)–O–)_{n}, whose elemental formula is HPO_{3}.

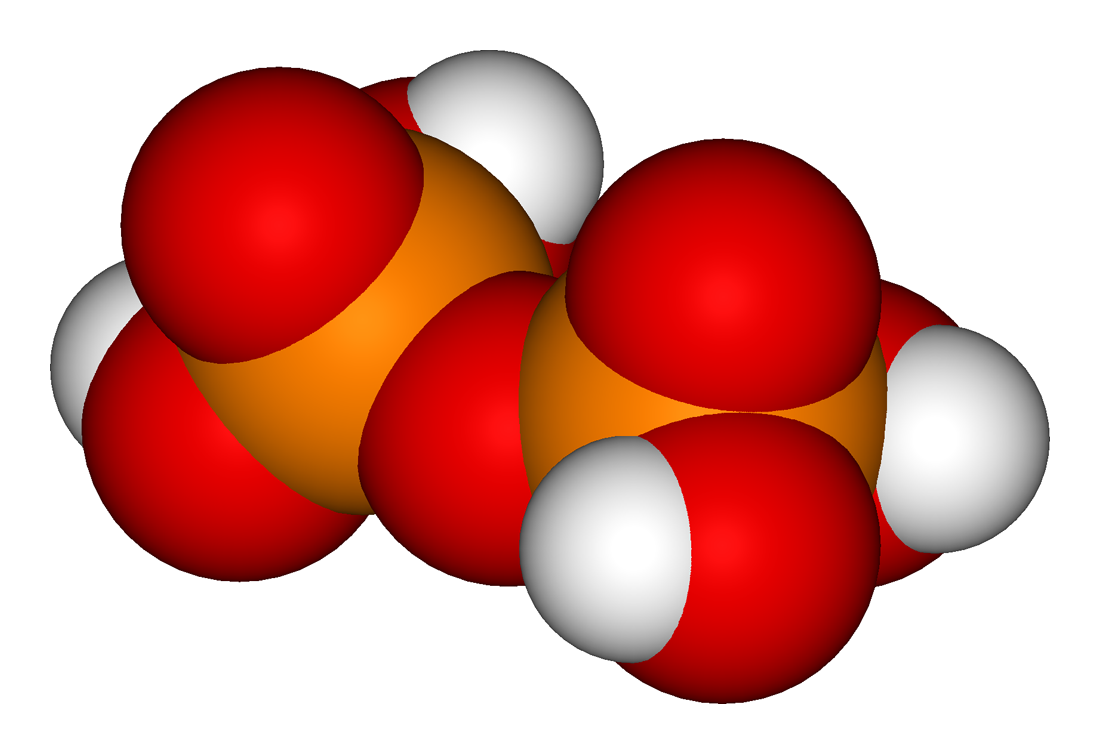
Pyrophosphoric acid
H_{4}P_{2}O_{7}

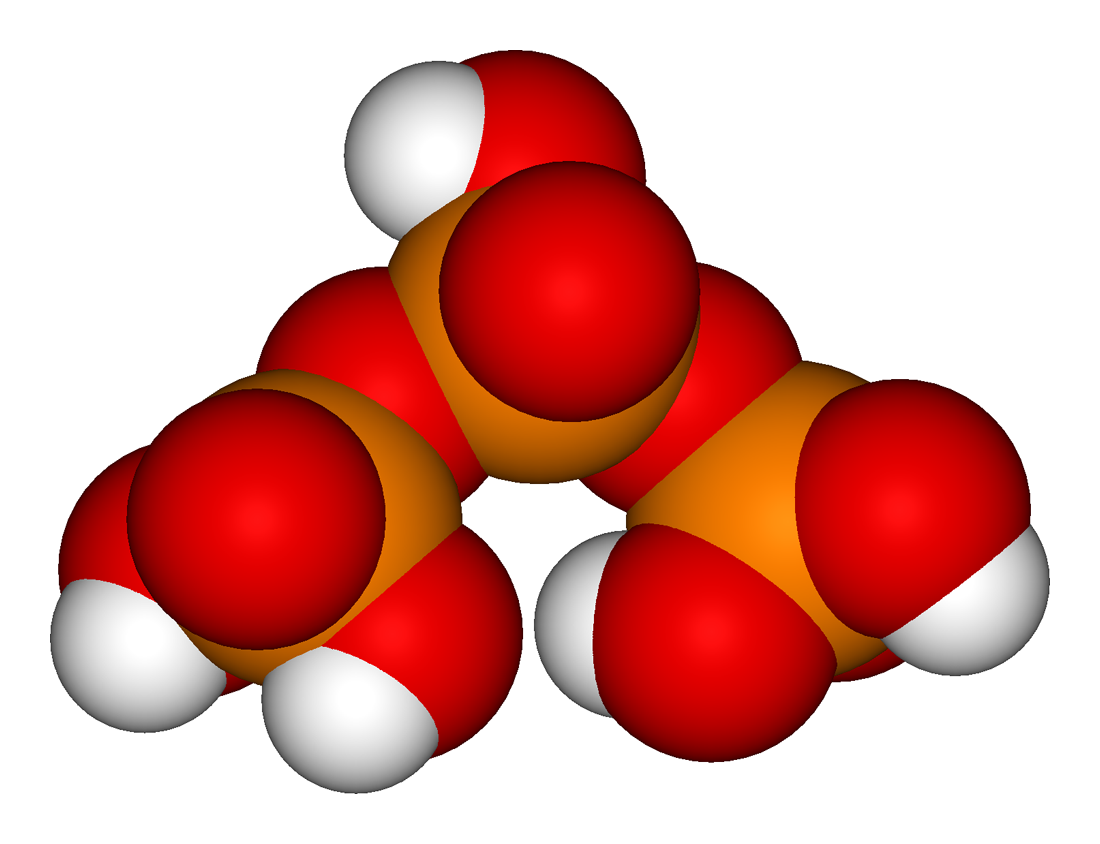
Tripolyphosphoric acid
H_{5}P_{3}O_{10}

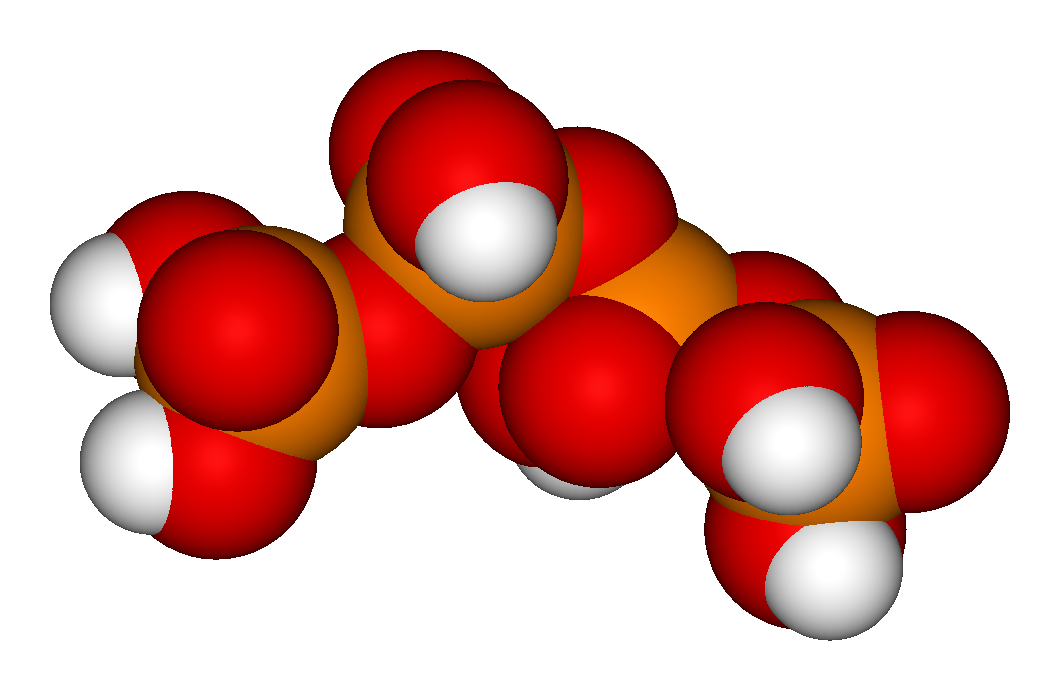
Tetrapolyphosphoric acid
H_{6}P_{4}O_{13}

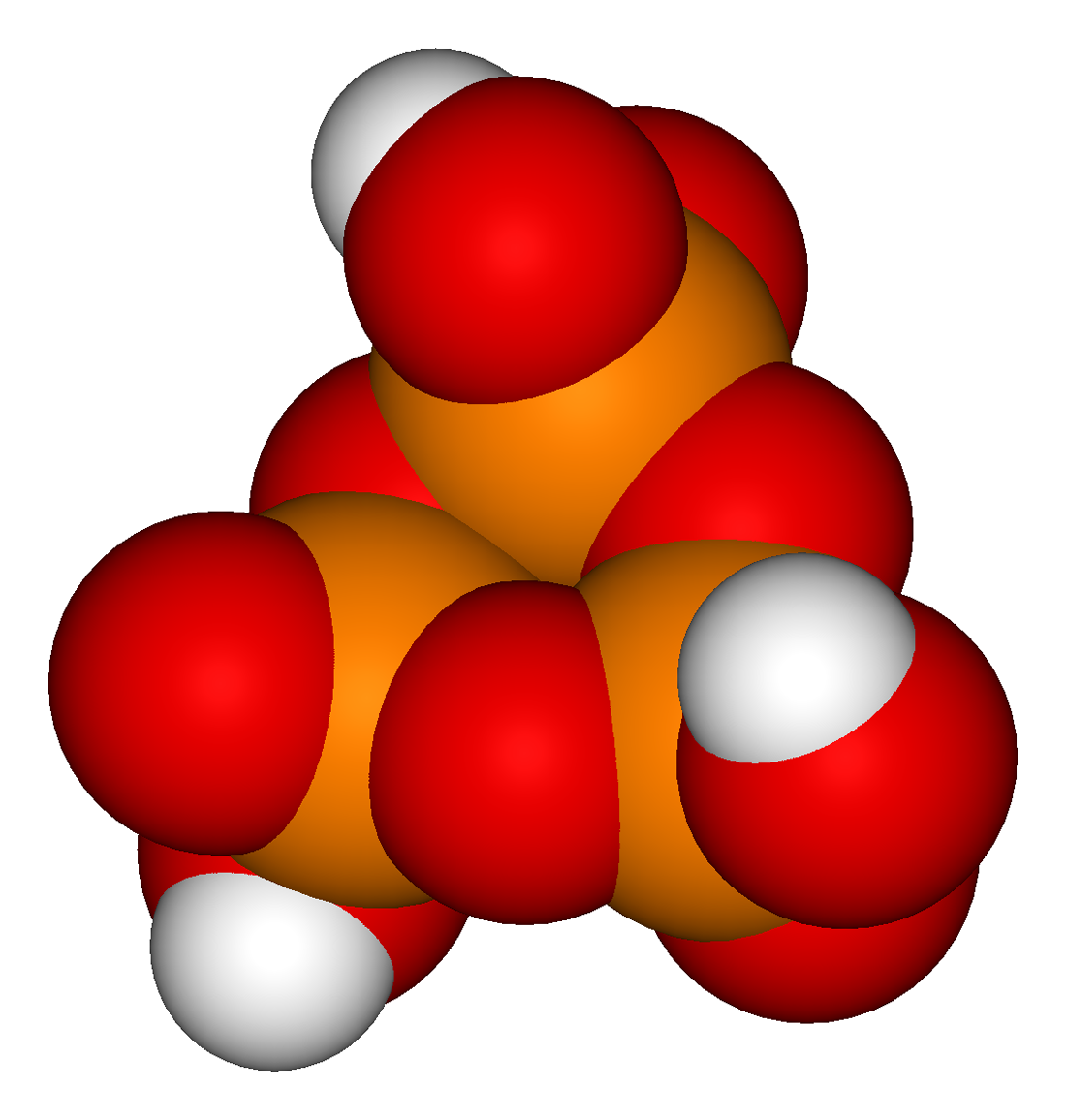
Trimetaphosphoric acid
H_{3}P_{3}O_{9}

Another compound that may be included in this class is

- Peroxomonophosphoric acid, H_{3}PO_{5} (or OP(OH)_{2}(OOH)), which can be seen as monophosphoric acid with a peroxide group replacing the oxygen atom in one of the hydroxyl groups

=== Mixed oxidation states ===
Some phosphorus oxoacids have two or more P atoms in different oxidation states. One example is

- Isohypophosphoric acid, H_{4}P_{2}O_{6} (or H(OH)(O)P−O−P(O)(OH)_{2}), a tetraprotic acid and isomer of hypophosphoric acid, containing P in oxidation state +3 and +5

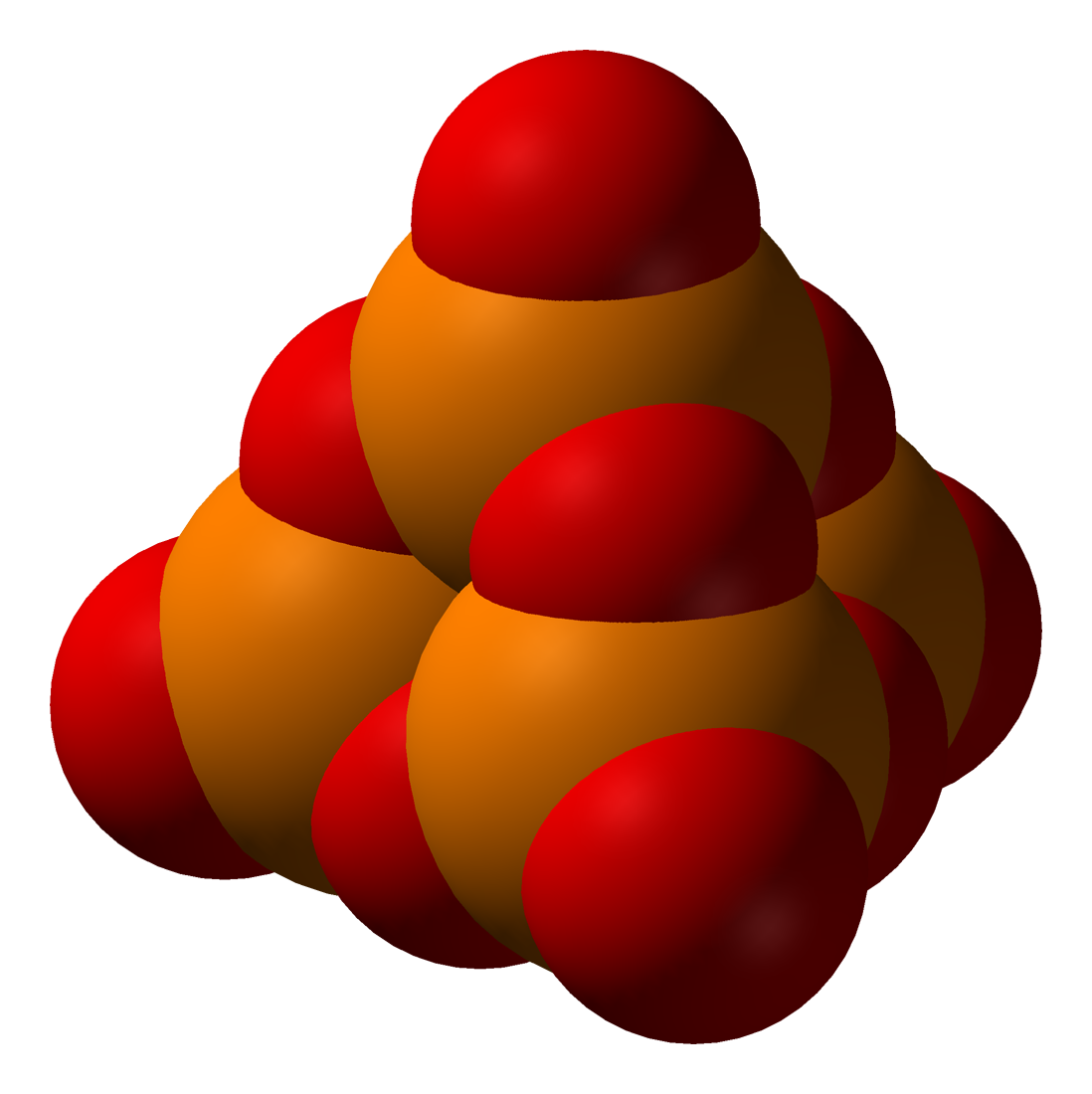
Phosphoric anhydride P_{4}O_{10}

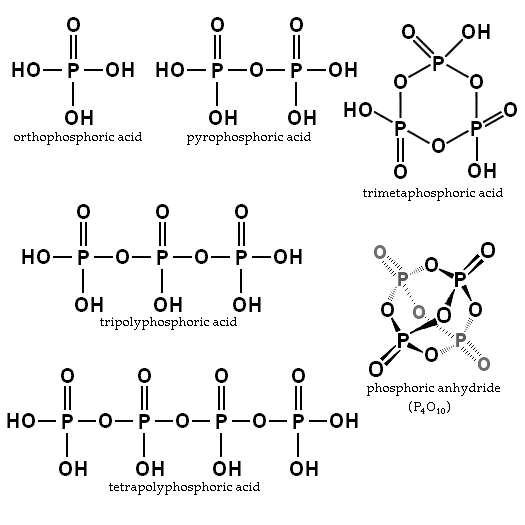
Some phosphoric acids

== See also ==
- Phosphoramidate
