= Diphosphate—serine phosphotransferase =

Class of enzymes

Diphosphate-serine phosphotransferase

Identifiers
- EC no.: 2.7.1.80
- CAS no.: 37205-58-6

Databases
- IntEnz: IntEnz view
- BRENDA: BRENDA entry
- ExPASy: NiceZyme view
- KEGG: KEGG entry
- MetaCyc: metabolic pathway
- PRIAM: profile
- PDB structures: RCSB PDB PDBe PDBsum
- Gene Ontology: AmiGO / QuickGO
Search
- PMC: articles
- PubMed: articles
- NCBI: proteins

Diphosphate-serine phosphotransferase (EC 2.7.1.80) is an enzyme that catalyzes the chemical reaction

diphosphate +
serine
phosphate +
phosphoserine

The enzyme characterised from Propionibacterium shermanii converts L-serine to phosphoserine by transferring a phosphate group from pyrophosphoric acid.

This enzyme is a transferase, specifically one transferring phosphorus-containing groups (phosphotransferases) with an alcohol group as acceptor. The systematic name of this enzyme class is diphosphate:L-serine O-phosphotransferase. Other names in common use include pyrophosphate-serine phosphotransferase, and pyrophosphate-L-serine phosphotransferase.
