= Homocysteine methylase =

Homocysteine methylase may refer to:

- Homocysteine S-methyltransferase
- 5-methyltetrahydropteroyltriglutamate—homocysteine S-methyltransferase
