= Sorbitol-6-phosphatase =

Class of enzymes

sorbitol-6-phosphatase

Identifiers
- EC no.: 3.1.3.50
- CAS no.: 80449-21-4

Databases
- BRENDA: enzyme data
- ExPASy: NiceZyme view
- KEGG: enzyme entry
- MetaCyc: metabolic pathway
- Rhea: reactions
- PDB structures: RCSB PDB PDBe PDBsum
- Gene Ontology: AmiGO / QuickGO
Search
- PMC: articles
- PubMed: articles
- NCBI: proteins

The enzyme sorbitol-6-phosphatase (EC 3.1.3.50) catalyzes the reaction

sorbitol 6-phosphate
H_{2}O
P_{i}
sorbitol

The enzyme characterised from apple seedlings hydrolyses sorbitol 6-phosphate to sorbitol and orthophosphate. The enzyme is a regulator of energy metabolism in silkworm. It has been studied as a means of producing sorbitol by photosynthesis in engineered cyanobacteria.

This enzyme is a hydrolase, specifically one acting on phosphoric monoester bonds. The systematic name of this enzyme class is sorbitol-6-phosphate phosphohydrolase. This enzyme is also called sorbitol-6-phosphate phosphatase.
