= Trimetaphosphatase =

Class of enzymes

Identifiers
- EC no.: 3.6.1.2
- CAS no.: 9024-84-4

Databases
- BRENDA: enzyme data
- ExPASy: NiceZyme view
- KEGG: enzyme entry
- MetaCyc: metabolic pathway
- Rhea: reactions
- PDB structures: RCSB PDB PDBe PDBsum
- Gene Ontology: AmiGO / QuickGO
Search
- PMC: articles
- PubMed: articles
- NCBI: proteins

Trimetaphosphatase (EC 3.6.1.2) is an enzyme characterised from yeast that catalyzes the hydrolysis of cyclic polyphosphates and trimetaphosphoric acid to their open-chain forms such as triphosphoric acid:

trimetaphosphoric acid
H_{2}O
triphosphoric acid

The phosphorus-oxygen bond in trimetaphosphoric acid is a so-called high-energy bond and its hydrolysis releases energy which can drive unfavourable biochemical transformations to completion.

This enzyme is a hydrolase, specifically those acting on acid anhydrides in phosphorus-containing anhydrides. The systematic name of this enzyme class is trimetaphosphate hydrolase. This enzyme is also called inorganic trimetaphosphatase.
