= Diadenosine hexaphosphate hydrolase (AMP-forming) =

Identifiers
- EC no.: 3.6.1.60

Databases
- BRENDA: enzyme data
- ExPASy: NiceZyme view
- KEGG: enzyme entry
- MetaCyc: metabolic pathway
- Rhea: reactions
- PDB structures: RCSB PDB PDBe PDBsum
Search
- PMC: articles
- PubMed: articles
- NCBI: proteins

NUDT10

Identifiers
- Aliases: NUDT10, APS2, DIPP3a, hDIPP3alpha, DIPP3-alpha, nudix hydrolase 10
- External IDs: OMIM: 300527; GeneCards: NUDT10
Available structures
PDB	Human UniProt search: PDBe RCSB
PDB	List of PDB id codes 3MCF
Enzyme activity
EC #	BRENDA	ExPASy	KEGG	MetaCyc
3.6.1.52	↗	↗	↗	↗
3.6.1.60	↗	↗	↗	↗

Gene location (Human)
Chr.	X chromosome (human)
Band	Xp11.22	Start	51,332,231 bp
Band	Xp11.22	End	51,337,525 bp
RNA expression pattern
Bgee	Human / Mouse (ortholog); Top expressed in: gonad; ganglionic eminence; right testis; testicle; left testis; Brodmann area 9; prefrontal cortex; right ovary; ventricular zone; left ovary / n/a; More reference expression data
BioGPS	n/a
Gene ontology
Molecular function	inositol-5-diphosphate-1,2,3,4,6-pentakisphosphate diphosphatase activity; inositol-1,5-bisdiphosphate-2,3,4,6-tetrakisphosphate 5-diphosphatase activity; hydrolase activity; metal ion binding; inositol-1-diphosphate-2,3,4,5,6-pentakisphosphate diphosphatase activity; inositol-1,5-bisdiphosphate-2,3,4,6-tetrakisphosphate 1-diphosphatase activity; inositol diphosphate tetrakisphosphate diphosphatase activity; inositol-3,5-bisdiphosphate-2,3,4,6-tetrakisphosphate 5-diphosphatase activity; inositol-3-diphosphate-1,2,4,5,6-pentakisphosphate diphosphatase activity; protein binding; inositol bisdiphosphate tetrakisphosphate diphosphatase activity; inositol diphosphate pentakisphosphate diphosphatase activity; endopolyphosphatase activity; diphosphoinositol-polyphosphate diphosphatase activity; bis(5'-adenosyl)-hexaphosphatase activity; bis(5'-adenosyl)-pentaphosphatase activity; m7G(5')pppN diphosphatase activity
Cellular component	nucleus; cytoplasm; cytosol
Biological process	inositol phosphate metabolic process; diphosphoinositol polyphosphate metabolic process; diadenosine pentaphosphate catabolic process; diadenosine hexaphosphate catabolic process; adenosine 5'-(hexahydrogen pentaphosphate) catabolic process
Sources:Amigo / QuickGO
Orthologs
Databases	NCBI: entry; OMA: entry
Species	Human	Mouse
Entrez	170685	n/a
Ensembl	ENSG00000122824	n/a
UniProt	Q8NFP7	n/a
RefSeq (mRNA)	NM_153183; NM_001304963	n/a
RefSeq (protein)	NP_001291892; NP_694853	n/a
Location (UCSC)	Chr X: 51.33 – 51.34 Mb	n/a
PubMed search		n/a
- Wikidata
View/Edit Human

Diadenosine hexaphosphate hydrolase (AMP-forming) (EC 3.6.1.60, hAps1, NUDT11 (gene), hAps2, NUDT10 (gene)) is an enzyme with systematic name P1,P6-bis(5'-adenosyl)hexaphosphate nucleotidohydrolase (AMP-forming). This enzyme catalyses the following chemical reaction

(1) P1,P6-bis(5'-adenosyl)hexaphosphate + H_{2}O $\rightleftharpoons$ adenosine 5'-pentaphosphate + AMP
(2) P1,P5-bis(5'-adenosyl)pentaphosphate + H_{2}O $\rightleftharpoons$ adenosine 5'-tetraphosphate + AMP

A divalent cation is essential for activity.
