= Trehalose-phosphatase =

Class of enzymes

trehalose-phosphatase

Identifiers
- EC no.: 3.1.3.12
- CAS no.: 9025-72-3

Databases
- BRENDA: enzyme data
- ExPASy: NiceZyme view
- KEGG: enzyme entry
- MetaCyc: metabolic pathway
- Rhea: reactions
- PDB structures: RCSB PDB PDBe PDBsum
- Gene Ontology: AmiGO / QuickGO
Search
- PMC: articles
- PubMed: articles
- NCBI: proteins

The enzyme trehalose-phosphatase (EC 3.1.3.12) catalyzes the reversible reaction

α,α-trehalose 6-phosphate
H_{2}O
P_{i}
H_{2}O
P_{i}
trehalose

The enzyme characterised from locust hydrolyses α,α-trehalose 6-phosphate to trehalose and orthophosphate. The enzyme is present in many organisms including plants, fungi and animals.

This enzyme is a hydrolase, specifically one acting on phosphoric monoester bonds. The systematic name is α,α-trehalose-6-phosphate phosphohydrolase. Other names in common use include trehalose 6-phosphatase, trehalose 6-phosphate phosphatase, and trehalose-6-phosphate phosphohydrolase.
