= Methylphosphothioglycerate phosphatase =

Class of enzymes

methylphosphothioglycerate phosphatase

Identifiers
- EC no.: 3.1.3.14
- CAS no.: 9025-78-9

Databases
- BRENDA: enzyme data
- ExPASy: NiceZyme view
- KEGG: enzyme entry
- MetaCyc: metabolic pathway
- Rhea: reactions
- PDB structures: RCSB PDB PDBe PDBsum
- Gene Ontology: AmiGO / QuickGO
Search
- PMC: articles
- PubMed: articles
- NCBI: proteins

The enzyme methylphosphothioglycerate phosphatase (EC 3.1.3.14) catalyzes the reaction

S-methyl 3-phospho-1-thio-D-glycerate
H_{2}O
P_{i}
S-methyl D-thioglycerate

The enzyme characterised from yeast hydrolyses S-methyl 3-phospho-1-thio-D-glycerate to S-methyl D-thioglycerate and orthophosphate.

This enzyme is a hydrolase, specifically one acting on phosphoric monoester bonds. The systematic name is S-methyl-3-phospho-1-thio-D-glycerate phosphohydrolase. This enzyme is also called methylthiophosphoglycerate phosphatase.
