= Phosphoric =

Phosphoric may refer to:

- Phosphoric acid
- Phosphoric anhydride, see phosphorus pentoxide

== See also ==
- Phosphorus
