= Anhydro-N-acetylmuramic acid kinase =

Enzyme

Identifiers
- EC no.: 2.7.1.170

Databases
- IntEnz: IntEnz view
- BRENDA: BRENDA entry
- ExPASy: NiceZyme view
- KEGG: KEGG entry
- MetaCyc: metabolic pathway
- PRIAM: profile
- PDB structures: RCSB PDB PDBe PDBsum
Search
- PMC: articles
- PubMed: articles
- NCBI: proteins

Anhydro-N-acetylmuramic acid kinase (EC 2.7.1.170, anhMurNAc kinase, AnmK) is an enzyme with systematic name ATP:1,6-anhydro-N-acetyl-beta-muramate 6-phosphotransferase. It catalyses the following chemical reaction

ATP +
1,6-anhydro-N-acetyl-β-muramic acid
ADP +
N-acetylmuramic acid 6-phosphate

The enzyme characterised from Escherichia coli and Pseudomonas aeruginosa converts 1,6-anhydro-N-acetyl-β-muramic acid to N-acetylmuramic acid 6-phosphate by transferring a phosphate group from the cofactor, adenosine triphosphate (ATP), which is converted to adenosine diphosphate (ADP).

N-acetyl-D-glucosamine 6-phosphate

The product is then converted to N-acetyl-D-glucosamine 6-phosphate by N-acetylmuramic acid 6-phosphate etherase. This sequence allows these organisms to recycle their cell wall.
