= Ongilog Lake mine =

Mine in Mongolia

- Location: Mongolia
- Products: Phosphates

The Ongilog Lake mine is a large mine located in Mongolia. Ongilog Lake represents one of the largest phosphates reserve in Mongolia having estimated reserves of 1.5 billion tonnes of ore grading 35% P_{2}O_{5}.
