= Hubsugui mine =

Mine in Mongolia

- Location: Mongolia
- Products: Phosphates

The Hubsugui mine is a large mine located in Mongolia. Hubsugui represents one of the largest phosphates reserve in Mongolia having estimated reserves of 632.9 million tonnes of ore grading 40% P_{2}O_{5}.
