= 3'-nucleotidase =

Class of enzymes

3′-nucleotidase

Identifiers
- EC no.: 3.1.3.6
- CAS no.: 9025-84-7

Databases
- BRENDA: enzyme data
- ExPASy: NiceZyme view
- KEGG: enzyme entry
- MetaCyc: metabolic pathway
- Rhea: reactions
- PDB structures: RCSB PDB PDBe PDBsum
- Gene Ontology: AmiGO / QuickGO
Search
- PMC: articles
- PubMed: articles
- NCBI: proteins

The enzyme 3′-nucleotidase (EC 3.1.3.6) catalyzes the reversible reaction

a 3′-ribonucleotide + H_{2}O $\rightleftharpoons$ a ribonucleoside + phosphate

3'-adenylic acid
H_{2}O
P_{i}
adenosine

The enzyme originally characterised from the barley hydrolyses 3'-adenylic acid to adenosine and orthophosphate, which form the phosphate ester in the starting material. The enzyme is selective for the isomer with the phosphate group in the 3'-position shown. It can also act on other nucleotides which have the phosphate group at this position in the ribose ring. There is evidence that this enzyme helps Leishmania parasites survive in their host.

This enzyme is a hydrolase, specifically one acting on phosphoric monoester bonds. The systematic name is 3′-ribonucleotide phosphohydrolase. Other names in common use include 3′-mononucleotidase, 3′-phosphatase, and 3′-ribonucleotidase.
