= Hypophosphoric acid =

Names
- IUPAC name Hypodiphosphoric acid
- Other names Diphosphoric acid

Identifiers
CAS Number	7803-60-3
3D model (JSmol)	Interactive image
ChEBI	CHEBI:29263
ChemSpider	22943
PubChem CID	24536
UNII	CY8Z35442Z
CompTox Dashboard (EPA)	DTXSID0064886
- InChI: InChI=1S/H4O6P2/c1-7(2,3)8(4,5)6/h(H2,1,2,3)(H2,4,5,6) Key: TVZISJTYELEYPI-UHFFFAOYSA-N
- SMILES: OP(O)(P(O)(O)=O)=O

Properties
Chemical formula	H_{4}P_{2}O_{6}
Molar mass	161.98 g/mol
Appearance	White solid (dihydrate)
Melting point	54 °C (129 °F; 327 K)
Acidity (pK_{a})	2.2, 2.8, 7.3, 10.0
Conjugate base	Hypophosphate
- Except where otherwise noted, data are given for materials in their standard state (at 25 °C [77 °F], 100 kPa). Infobox references

Hypophosphoric acid is a mineral acid with the formula H_{4}P_{2}O_{6}, with phosphorus in a formal oxidation state of +4. In the solid state it is present as the dihydrate, H_{4}P_{2}O_{6}·2H_{2}O. In hypophosphoric acid the phosphorus atoms are identical and joined directly with a P−P bond. Isohypophosphoric acid is a structural isomer of hypophosphoric acid in which one phosphorus has a hydrogen directedly bonded to it and that phosphorus atom is linked to the other one by an oxygen bridge to give a phosphorous acid/phosphoric acid mixed anhydride. The two phosphorus atoms are in the +3 and +5 oxidation states, respectively.

== Preparation and reactions ==
Hypophosphoric acid can be prepared by the reaction of red phosphorus with sodium chlorite at room temperature.

2 P + 2 NaClO_{2} + 2 H_{2}O → Na_{2}H_{2}P_{2}O_{6} + 2 HCl

A mixture of hypophosphoric acid, phosphorous acid (H_{3}PO_{3}) and phosphoric acid (H_{3}PO_{4}) is produced when white phosphorus oxidises in air when partially immersed in water.

The tetrasodium salt Na_{4}P_{2}O_{6}·10H_{2}O crystallises at pH 10 and the disodium salt, Na_{2}H_{2}PO_{6}·6H_{2}O at pH 5.2. The disodium salt can be passed through an ion exchange column to form the acid dihydrate, H_{4}P_{2}O_{6}·2H_{2}O.

The anhydrous acid can be formed by vacuum dehydration over P_{4}O_{10} or by the reaction of H_{2}S on lead hypophosphate, Pb_{2}P_{2}O_{6}.

Hypophosphoric acid is tetraprotic with dissociation constants pK_{a1} = 2.2, pK_{a2} = 2.8, pK_{a3} = 7.3 and pK_{a4} = 10.0.

On standing the anhydrous acid undergoes rearrangement and disproportionation to form a mixture of isohypophosphoric acid, HPO(OH)-O-PO(OH)_{2}; pyrophosphoric acid H_{4}P_{2}O_{7} and pyrophosphorous acid.

Hypophosphoric acid is unstable in hot hydrochloric acid, in 4 M HCl it hydrolyses to give H_{3}PO_{3} + H_{3}PO_{4}.

== Structure ==
Hypophosphorus acid contains oxonium ions and is best formulated [H_{3}O^{+}]_{2} [H_{2}P_{2}O_{6}]^{2−}. The acid is isostructural with the diammonium salt which contains the [HOPO_{2}PO_{2}OH]^{2−} anion with a P−P bond length of 219 pm.

The HOPO_{2}PO_{2}OH^{2−} anion in Na_{2}H_{2}P_{2}O_{6}·6H_{2}O has a symmetric, staggered ethane-like structure with a P−P bond of length 219 pm. Each phosphorus atom has two P−O bonds with length 151 pm, and a P−OH bond length of 159 pm.

== Hypophosphate salts ==
Many hypophosphate salts are known, for example, K_{4}P_{2}O_{6}·8H_{2}O, Ca_{2}P_{2}O_{6}·2H_{2}O, K_{3}HP_{2}O_{6}·3H_{2}O, K_{2}H_{2}P_{2}O_{6}·2H_{2}O, KH_{3}P_{2}O_{6}.

On standing in air, hypophosphates tend to oxidise to pyrophosphates containing the P_{2}O^{4−}_{7} ion where P has a formal oxidation state of +5. Hypophosphates are stable to alkali hydroxides.^{[contradictory}^{]}.In fused sodium hydroxide they convert rapidly to the orthophosphate containing PO^{3−}_{4}.

== Polyhypophosphates ==
Polyhypophosphates are known containing linear anions, for example Na_{5}P_{3}O_{8} containing O(PO_{2})_{3}O^{5−} with a P−P−P chain and Na_{6}P_{4}O_{10}·2H_{2}O containing O(PO_{2})_{4}O^{6−}, with a P−P−P−P chain. The cyclic anion (PO_{2})^{6−}_{6}, (hypohexametaphosphate) where each phosphorus atom has an oxidation state of +3 is formed when a suspension of red phosphorus in KOH is oxidised with bromine.

== See also ==
- Dithionic acid, the sulfur equivalent.
