= Eaton's reagent =

Chemical compound

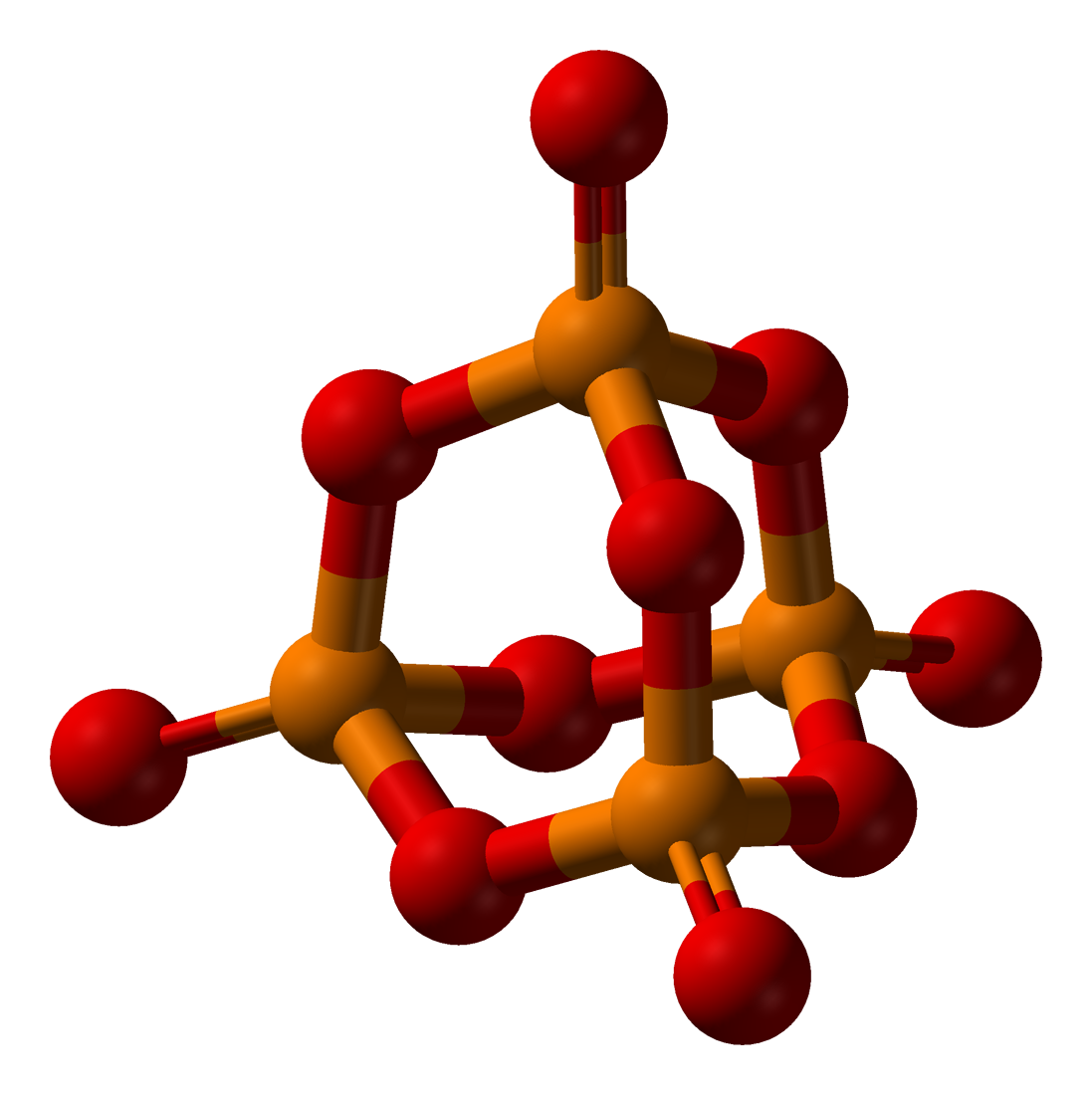

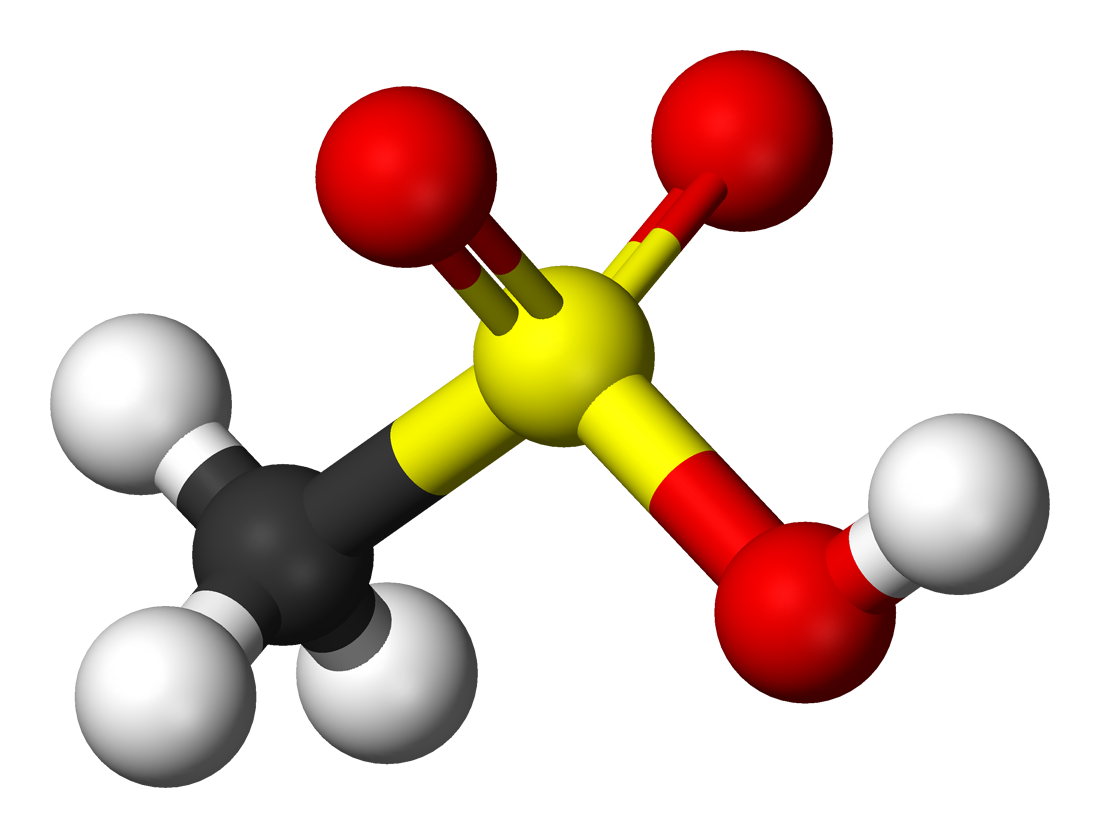

Names
- Other names Phosphorus pentoxide-methanesulfonic acid

Identifiers
CAS Number	39394-84-8
ECHA InfoCard	100.204.349
EC Number	679-375-3
CompTox Dashboard (EPA)	DTXSID30583215

Properties
Solubility in water	hydrolyzes
- Except where otherwise noted, data are given for materials in their standard state (at 25 °C [77 °F], 100 kPa). Infobox references

Eaton's reagent is a solution of phosphorus pentoxide (P_{2}O_{5}) in methanesulfonic acid (CH_{3}SO_{3}H), averaging 7.7% by weight. The components form a mobile, clear liquid with good solvent properties, making it significantly easier to handle as a dehydrating reaction medium than polyphosphoric acid.

== Discovery and synthesis ==
In 1973, Philip Eaton and colleagues described a 1:10 mixture of solid phosphorus pentoxide and methanesulfonic acid which forms a clear solution at room temperature under stirring and weak exothermicity.

== Properties ==
Eaton's reagent is a clear, colorless, and corrosive liquid that is practically insoluble in very nonpolar solvents, such as alkanes and aromatics, but readily soluble in many organic solvents. It decomposes rapidly with water to form polyphosphoric acid (H_{n + 2}P_{n}O_{3n + 1}) or phosphoric acid (H_{3}PO_{4}). With a P_{2}O_{5} content between 7.2 and 8.5%, Eaton's reagent is significantly less viscous than polyphosphoric acid even at room temperature and is therefore much easier to measure and stir.

== Usage ==
The strong dehydrating effect of phosphorus pentoxide (and polyphosphoric acid) – which is used in chemistry as a drying agent for hydrated solids – is also evident in dehydration reactions, such as the esterification of carboxylic acids and alcohols or in named reactions, such as the Fischer indole synthesis, the Beckmann rearrangement, the Schmidt reaction, and others. A mixed anhydride is suspected as the active agent in solution, in addition to the detected methanesulfonic anhydride. The solution of P_{2}O_{5} in MeSO_{3}H produces an easily accessible, inexpensive, safe to handle in reaction control and work-up, and environmentally friendly reagent with good solubilizing properties for many organic compounds.

=== Acid-induced rearrangements with Eaton's reagent ===
The rearrangement of the aroma compound γ-decalactone to the odor compound dihydrojasmone with dehydration is carried out almost quantitatively (92% yield) using Eaton's reagent at room temperature.

Synthese von Dihydrojasmon mittels Eaton-Reagenz

The Beckmann rearrangement of cyclohexanone oxime to ε-caprolactam at 100 °C also achieves almost quantitative yield.

Beckmann-Umlagerung mittels Eaton-Reagenz zu Caprolactam

=== Cyclizations with Eaton's reagent ===
As an example of a cyclization, phenol and Meldrum's acid are reacted in a Pechmann condensation to produce 4-hydroxycoumarin in an overall yield of 69%.

4-HC Synthese mit Meldrumsäure

Ring-substituted N-methylphenylacetic acid amides can be easily and efficiently cyclized to tetrahydroquinolin-3-ones in a Pictet-Spengler reaction with paraformaldehyde and Eaton's reagent.

Synthese von Tetrahydroisochinolinonen mittels Eaton-Reagenz

The closely related 4-quinolones are the basis for quinolone antibiotics that were frequently prescribed in the past. These antibiotics can also be obtained in high yields (>90%) by the Knoevenagel condensation of substituted anilines with dimethyl methoxymethylene malonate to the corresponding enamines and subsequent cyclization with Eaton's reagent.

Synthese von 4-Chinolonen mittels Eaton-Reagenz

Benzofurans can be obtained in good yields (up to > 90%) by reacting them with 2-phenoxyketones – from readily available α-bromoketones and phenols – via a reaction also known as "cyclodehydration" with Eaton's reagent.

Even at room temperature, a multi-component reaction involving aldehydes, 1,3-dicarbonyl compounds such as acetoacetic esters or ketones and urea forms 3,4-dihydropyrimidin-2(1H)-ones – so-called Biginelli compounds – which represent valuable precursors for pharmaceuticals.

Biginelli-Reaktion mit Eaton-Reagenz

=== Polymers with Eaton's reagent ===
Polyether ether ketones can be formed, for example, from diphenyl ether-4,4′-dicarboxylic acid and 1,4-diphenoxybenzene by heating for several hours in Eaton's reagent in quantitative yield and with high intrinsic viscosity, i.e., high molecular weight.

Synthese von PEEK-Material mittels Eaton-Reagenz

Extensive work has been carried out on the formation of polybenzimidazoles, e.g. by direct synthesis from dicarboxylic acids and tetraamines upon brief heating in Eaton's reagent.

PBI-Direktsynthese mittels Eaton-Reagenz

The PBI obtained in this way only decomposes at 470 °C in air and at 540 °C under nitrogen.

Phosphoric acid-doped PBI have long been investigated as a potential replacement for the sulfonic acid-containing fluoropolymer Nafion in polymer electrolyte fuel cells. The incorporation of trifluoromethyl groups generally improves the solubility, processability, and thermal and dielectric properties of polymers. The reaction of trifluoromethyl-containing dicarboxylic acids with 3,3′-diaminobenzidine in the presence of Eaton's reagent produces PBI variants that could be suitable as proton exchange membranes in fuel cells.

PEMFC-Material mittels Eaton-Reagenz

PBI variants for the construction of gas separation membranes for H2/CO2 mixtures at elevated temperatures can also be obtained by water-releasing polycondensation of sulfone-containing tetraamines (3,3',4,4'-tetraaminodiphenylsulfone) with isophthalic acid using Eaton's reagent.

TADPS-PBI-Synthese mittels Eaton-Reagenz

A larger number of acid-catalyzed rearrangement and cyclization reactions using Eaton's reagent have been described in recent literature.
