= Diphosphoinositol-polyphosphate diphosphatase =

Class of enzymes

Identifiers
- EC no.: 3.6.1.52

Databases
- BRENDA: enzyme data
- ExPASy: NiceZyme view
- KEGG: enzyme entry
- MetaCyc: metabolic pathway
- Rhea: reactions
- PDB structures: RCSB PDB PDBe PDBsum
Search
- PMC: articles
- PubMed: articles
- NCBI: proteins

Diphosphoinositol-polyphosphate diphosphatase (EC 3.6.1.52) is an enzyme characterised from rat liver that catalyzes the chemical reaction:

diphospho-myo-inositol polyphosphate + H_{2}O $\rightleftharpoons$ myo-inositol polyphosphate + phosphate

For example, the enzyme converts 5-diphospho-1D-myo-inositol pentakisphosphate to phytic acid:

5-diphospho-1D-myo-inositol pentakisphosphate
H_{2}O
P_{i}
phytic acid

This enzyme is a hydrolase, specifically one acting on acid anhydrides in phosphorus-containing anhydrides. The systematic name of this enzyme class is diphospho-myo-inositol-polyphosphate diphosphohydrolase. Other names in use include diphosphoinositol-polyphosphate phosphohydrolase, and DIPP.

== Structural studies ==
As of late 2007, three structures have been solved for this class of enzymes, with PDB accession codes PDB: 2DUK, PDB: 2FVV, and PDB: 2Q9P.
