= NUDT11 =

Protein-coding gene in the species Homo sapiens

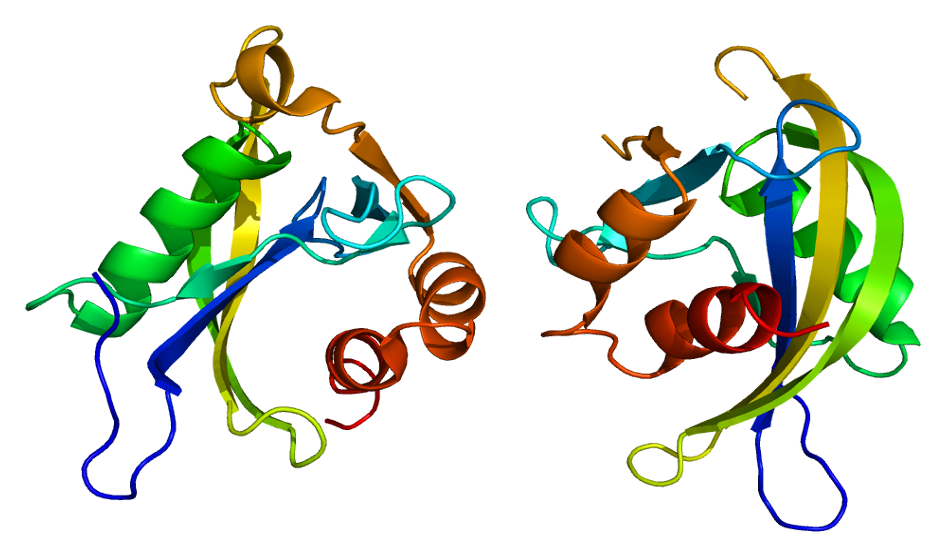

Identifiers
- Aliases: NUDT11, APS1, ASP1, DIPP3b, DIPP3beta, hDIPP3beta, nudix hydrolase 11
- External IDs: OMIM: 300528; MGI: 1930957; HomoloGene: 86995; GeneCards: NUDT11; OMA:NUDT11 - orthologs
- EC number: 3.6.1.60

Gene location (Human)
Chr.	X chromosome (human)
Band	Xp11.22	Start	51,490,011 bp
Band	Xp11.22	End	51,496,592 bp

Gene location (Mouse)
Chr.	X chromosome (mouse)
Band	X|X A1.1	Start	5,959,507 bp
Band	X|X A1.1	End	5,967,164 bp
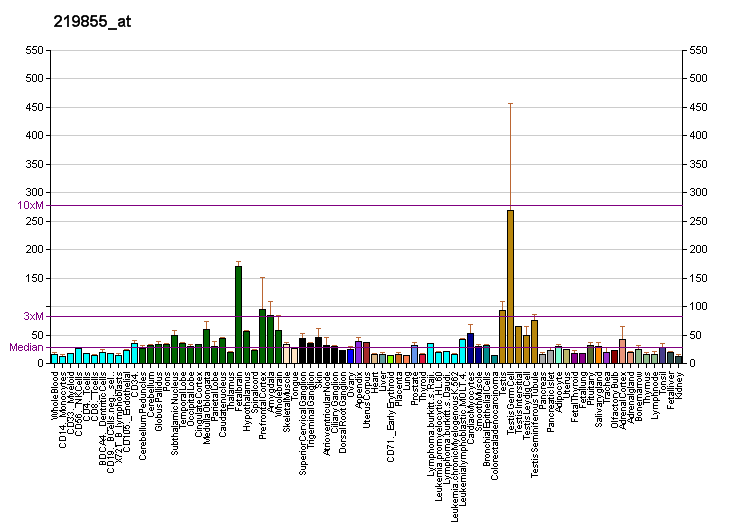
RNA expression pattern
Bgee	Human / Mouse (ortholog); Top expressed in: orbitofrontal cortex; Brodmann area 23; embryo; ganglionic eminence; middle temporal gyrus; gonad; right testis; superior frontal gyrus; oocyte; secondary oocyte / Top expressed in: arcuate nucleus; dorsomedial hypothalamic nucleus; median eminence; ventromedial nucleus; suprachiasmatic nucleus; paraventricular nucleus of hypothalamus; barrel cortex; supraoptic nucleus; yolk sac; ventral tegmental area; More reference expression data
BioGPS	More reference expression data
Gene ontology
Molecular function	inositol-3-diphosphate-1,2,4,5,6-pentakisphosphate diphosphatase activity; inositol diphosphate tetrakisphosphate diphosphatase activity; inositol-3,5-bisdiphosphate-2,3,4,6-tetrakisphosphate 5-diphosphatase activity; hydrolase activity; metal ion binding; inositol-5-diphosphate-1,2,3,4,6-pentakisphosphate diphosphatase activity; inositol-1,5-bisdiphosphate-2,3,4,6-tetrakisphosphate 1-diphosphatase activity; inositol-1,5-bisdiphosphate-2,3,4,6-tetrakisphosphate 5-diphosphatase activity; inositol-1-diphosphate-2,3,4,5,6-pentakisphosphate diphosphatase activity; inositol diphosphate pentakisphosphate diphosphatase activity; inositol bisdiphosphate tetrakisphosphate diphosphatase activity; endopolyphosphatase activity; diphosphoinositol-polyphosphate diphosphatase activity; bis(5'-adenosyl)-hexaphosphatase activity; bis(5'-adenosyl)-pentaphosphatase activity; m7G(5')pppN diphosphatase activity
Cellular component	intracellular anatomical structure; nucleus; cytoplasm; cytosol
Biological process	inositol phosphate metabolic process; diphosphoinositol polyphosphate metabolic process; diadenosine pentaphosphate catabolic process; diadenosine hexaphosphate catabolic process; adenosine 5'-(hexahydrogen pentaphosphate) catabolic process
Sources:Amigo / QuickGO
Orthologs
Species	Human	Mouse
Entrez	55190	58242
Ensembl	ENSG00000196368	ENSMUSG00000073295
UniProt	Q96G61	P0C027; P0C028
RefSeq (mRNA)	NM_018159	NM_021431
RefSeq (protein)	NP_060629	NP_001026834; NP_067406; NP_067406
Location (UCSC)	Chr X: 51.49 – 51.5 Mb	Chr X: 5.96 – 5.97 Mb
PubMed search
- Wikidata
View/Edit Human	View/Edit Mouse

Diphosphoinositol polyphosphate phosphohydrolase 3-beta is an enzyme that in humans is encoded by the NUDT11 gene.

NUDT11 belongs to a subgroup of phosphohydrolases that preferentially attack diphosphoinositol polyphosphates.
