= N-acetylmuramic acid 6-phosphate etherase =

Identifiers
- EC no.: 4.2.1.126

Databases
- IntEnz: IntEnz view
- BRENDA: BRENDA entry
- ExPASy: NiceZyme view
- KEGG: KEGG entry
- MetaCyc: metabolic pathway
- PRIAM: profile
- PDB structures: RCSB PDB PDBe PDBsum
Search
- PMC: articles
- PubMed: articles
- NCBI: proteins

N-acetylmuramic acid 6-phosphate etherase (EC 4.2.1.126, MurNAc-6-P etherase, MurQ) is an enzyme with systematic name (R)-lactate hydro-lyase (adding N-acetyl-D-glucosamine 6-phosphate; N-acetylmuramate 6-phosphate-forming). It catalyses the following chemical reaction

N-acetylmuramic acid 6-phosphate
(R)-lactic acid
+
N-acetyl-D-glucosamine 6-phosphate

The reaction cleaves a lactic acid group from the substrate, giving N-acetyl-D-glucosamine 6-phosphate.

1,6-anhydro-N-acetyl-β-muramic acid

This enzyme characterised from Escherichia coli acts, in some Pseudomonadota, with anhydro-N-acetylmuramic acid kinase to allow recycling of cell wall components via 1,6-anhydro-N-acetyl-β-muramic acid.
