= Triphosphono phosphate =

Names
- IUPAC name Triphosphono phosphate
- Systematic IUPAC name Triphosphono phosphate
- Other names Isotetrapolyphosphoric acid; Branched tetrapolyphosphoric acid

Identifiers
3D model (JSmol)	Interactive image
ChemSpider	19026168
PubChem CID	22081485
CompTox Dashboard (EPA)	DTXSID901336457
- InChI: InChI=1S/H6O13P4/c1-14(2,3)11-17(10,12-15(4,5)6)13-16(7,8)9/h(H2,1,2,3)(H2,4,5,6)(H2,7,8,9) Key: GAEXZRLVNIQLRF-UHFFFAOYSA-N; InChI=1S/H6O13P4/c1-14(2,3)11-17(10,12-15(4,5)6)13-16(7,8)9/h(H2,1,2,3)(H2,4,5,6)(H2,7,8,9) Key: GAEXZRLVNIQLRF-UHFFFAOYSA-N
- SMILES: OP(=O)(O)OP(=O)(OP(=O)(O)O)OP(=O)(O)O

Properties
Chemical formula	H_{6}O_{13}P_{4}
Molar mass	337.930 g·mol^{−1}
- Except where otherwise noted, data are given for materials in their standard state (at 25 °C [77 °F], 100 kPa). Infobox references

Triphosphono phosphate is the simplest branched polyphosphoric acid. It is a hexaprotic acid. It is used to prepare phosphoric monoesters.
