= 5-Methyltetrahydropteroyltriglutamate—homocysteine S-methyltransferase =

Class of enzymes

5-methyltetrahydropteroyltriglutamate-homocysteine S-methyltransferase

Identifiers
- EC no.: 2.1.1.14
- CAS no.: 9068-29-5

Databases
- BRENDA: enzyme data
- ExPASy: NiceZyme view
- KEGG: enzyme entry
- MetaCyc: metabolic pathway
- Rhea: reactions
- PDB structures: RCSB PDB PDBe PDBsum
- Gene Ontology: AmiGO / QuickGO
Search
- PMC: articles
- PubMed: articles
- NCBI: proteins

In enzymology, a 5-methyltetrahydropteroyltriglutamate—homocysteine S-methyltransferase (EC 2.1.1.14) is an enzyme that catalyzes the chemical reaction

5-methyltetrahydropteroyltri-L-glutamate + L-homocysteine $\rightleftharpoons$ tetrahydropteroyltri-L-glutamate + L-methionine

Thus, the two substrates of this enzyme are 5-methyltetrahydropteroyltri-L-glutamate and L-homocysteine, whereas its two products are tetrahydropteroyltri-L-glutamate and L-methionine. This enzyme participates in methionine metabolism. It has 2 cofactors: orthophosphate, and zinc.

== Nomenclature ==
This enzyme belongs to the family of transferases, specifically those transferring one-carbon group methyltransferases. The systematic name of this enzyme class is 5-methyltetrahydropteroyltri-L-glutamate:L-homocysteine S-methyltransferase. Other names in common use include tetrahydropteroyltriglutamate methyltransferase, homocysteine methylase, methyltransferase, tetrahydropteroylglutamate-homocysteine transmethylase, methyltetrahydropteroylpolyglutamate:homocysteine methyltransferase, cobalamin-independent methionine synthase, methionine synthase (cobalamin-independent), and MetE.

== Structure ==
The enzyme from Escherichia coli consists of two alpha8-beta8 (TIM) barrels positioned face to face and thought to have evolved by gene duplication. The active site lies between the tops of the two barrels, the N-terminal barrel binds 5-methyltetrahydropteroyltri-L-glutamic acid and the C-terminal barrel binds homocysteine. Homocysteine is coordinated to a zinc ion, as initially suggested by spectroscopy and mutagenesis.
