= Homocysteine S-methyltransferase =

Enzyme

Identifiers
- EC no.: 2.1.1.10
- CAS no.: 9012-40-2

Databases
- IntEnz: IntEnz view
- BRENDA: BRENDA entry
- ExPASy: NiceZyme view
- KEGG: KEGG entry
- MetaCyc: metabolic pathway
- PRIAM: profile
- PDB structures: RCSB PDB PDBe PDBsum
- Gene Ontology: AmiGO / QuickGO
Search
- PMC: articles
- PubMed: articles
- NCBI: proteins

Homocysteine S-methyltransferase (EC 2.1.1.10) is an enzyme that catalyzes the chemical reaction

S-methyl-L-methioninate
+
L-homocysteine
2
L-methionine

A methyl group is transferred from S-methyl-L-methioninate to L-homocysteine, forming two molecules of the amino acid, L-methionine. The methyl group can also be transferred from S-adenosyl methionine but in plants this is less preferred than from S-methyl-L-methioninate.

== Alternative names ==
The systematic name of this enzyme class is S-adenosyl-L-methionine:L-homocysteine S-methyltransferase. Other names in use include S-adenosylmethionine homocysteine transmethylase, S-methylmethionine homocysteine transmethylase, adenosylmethionine transmethylase, methylmethionine:homocysteine methyltransferase, adenosylmethionine:homocysteine methyltransferase, homocysteine methylase, homocysteine methyltransferase, homocysteine transmethylase, L-homocysteine S-methyltransferase, S-adenosyl-L-methionine:L-homocysteine methyltransferase, S-adenosylmethionine-homocysteine transmethylase, and S-adenosylmethionine:homocysteine methyltransferase.
