= Triphosphoric acid =

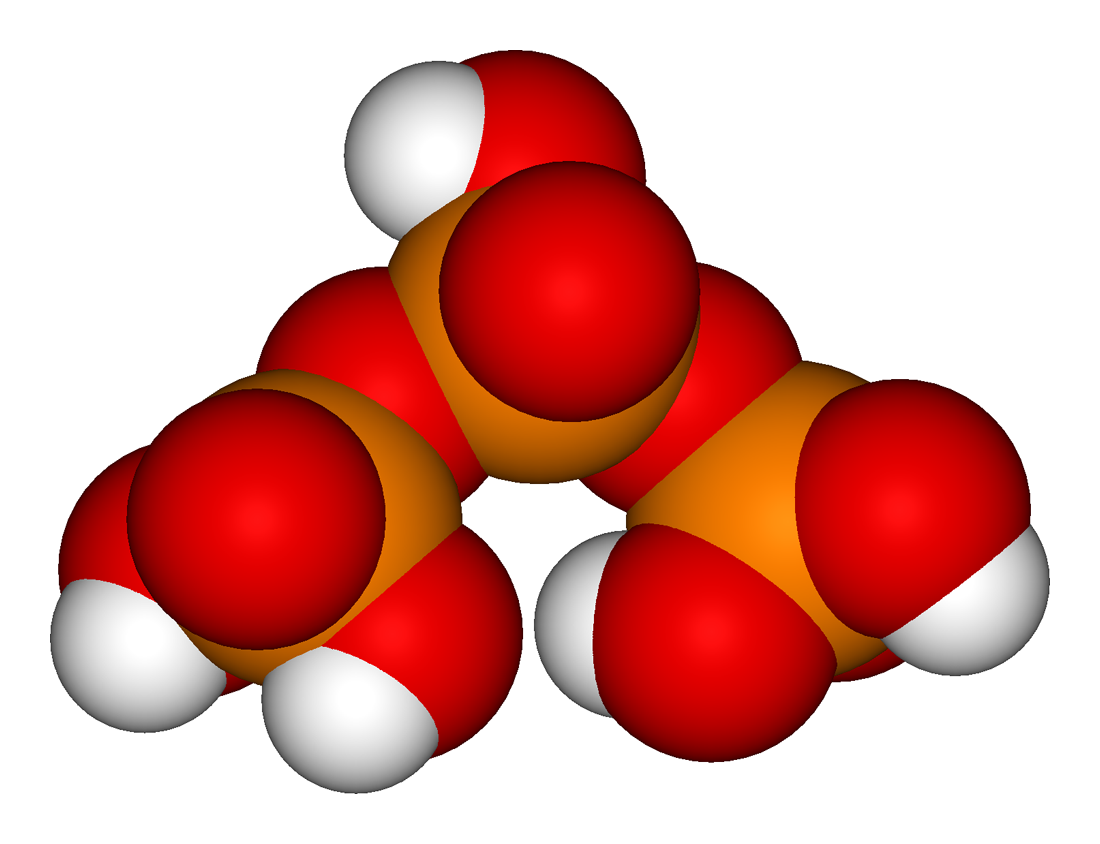

Names
- IUPAC name Diphosphono hydrogenphosphate
- Systematic IUPAC name Triphosphoric acid Tripolyphosphoric acid
- Other names Diphosphonophosphoric acid Phosphono trihydrogenpyrophosphate Phosphonopyrophosphoric acid

Identifiers
CAS Number	10380-08-2
3D model (JSmol)	Interactive image
ChEBI	CHEBI:39949
ChemSpider	958
ECHA InfoCard	100.030.752
EC Number	233-840-3
KEGG	C00404
PubChem CID	983
UNII	NU43IAG5BC
CompTox Dashboard (EPA)	DTXSID7047483
- InChI: InChI=1S/H5O10P3/c1-11(2,3)9-13(7,8)10-12(4,5)6/h(H,7,8)(H2,1,2,3)(H2,4,5,6) Key: UNXRWKVEANCORM-UHFFFAOYSA-N
- SMILES: OP(=O)(O)OP(=O)(O)OP(=O)(O)O

Properties
Chemical formula	H_{5}P_{3}O_{10}
Molar mass	257.95 g/mol
Acidity (pK_{a})	See body
Conjugate base	Triphosphate

Hazards
- Occupational safety and health (OHS/OSH)
Main hazards	Corrosive (C)
- Except where otherwise noted, data are given for materials in their standard state (at 25 °C [77 °F], 100 kPa). verify (what is ?) Infobox references

Triphosphoric acid (also tripolyphosphoric acid), with formula H_{5}P_{3}O_{10}, is a condensed form of phosphoric acid. In the family of phosphoric acids, it is the next polyphosphoric acid after pyrophosphoric acid, H_{4}P_{2}O_{7}, also called diphosphoric acid.

Compounds such as ATP (adenosine triphosphate) are esters of triphosphoric acid.

Triphosphoric acid has not been obtained in crystalline form. The equilibrium mixture with an overall composition corresponding to H_{5}P_{3}O_{10} contains about 20% of triphosphoric acid. A solution of the pure species can be obtained by ion exchange of the sodium salt, sodium triphosphate, at 0 °C.

Triphosporic acid is a pentaprotic acid, meaning that it can release five protons in basic enough conditions. Sources differ on the corresponding pK_{a} values:

- 1.0; 2.2; 2.3; 5.7; 8.5
- 1.0; 2.2; 2.3; 3.7; 8.5
