= Pyrophosphoric acid =

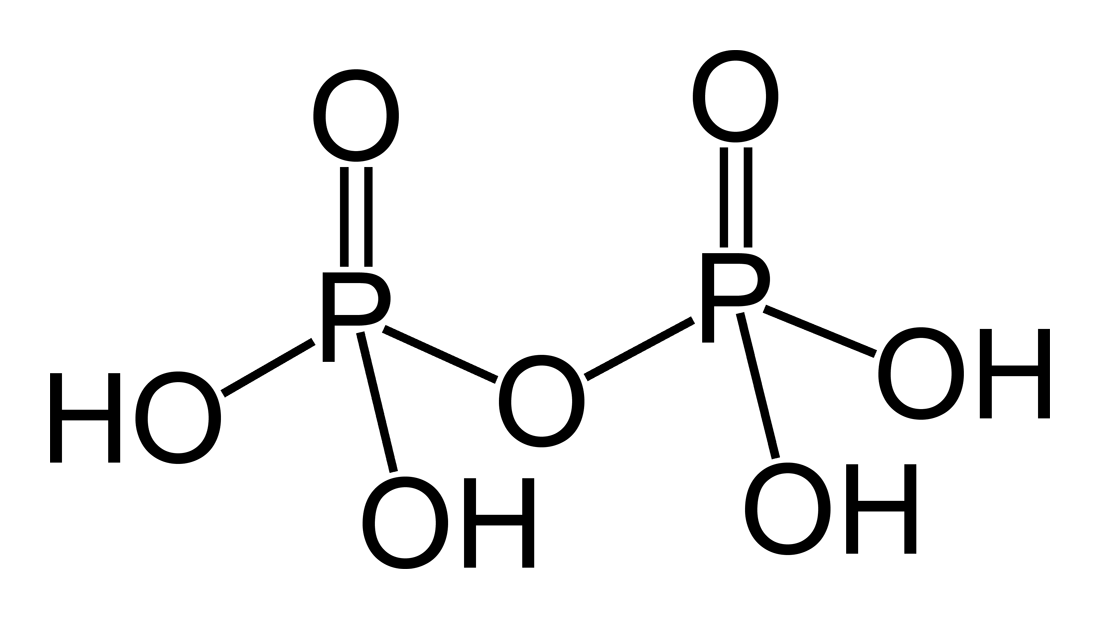
- Chemical structure of pyrophosphoric acid

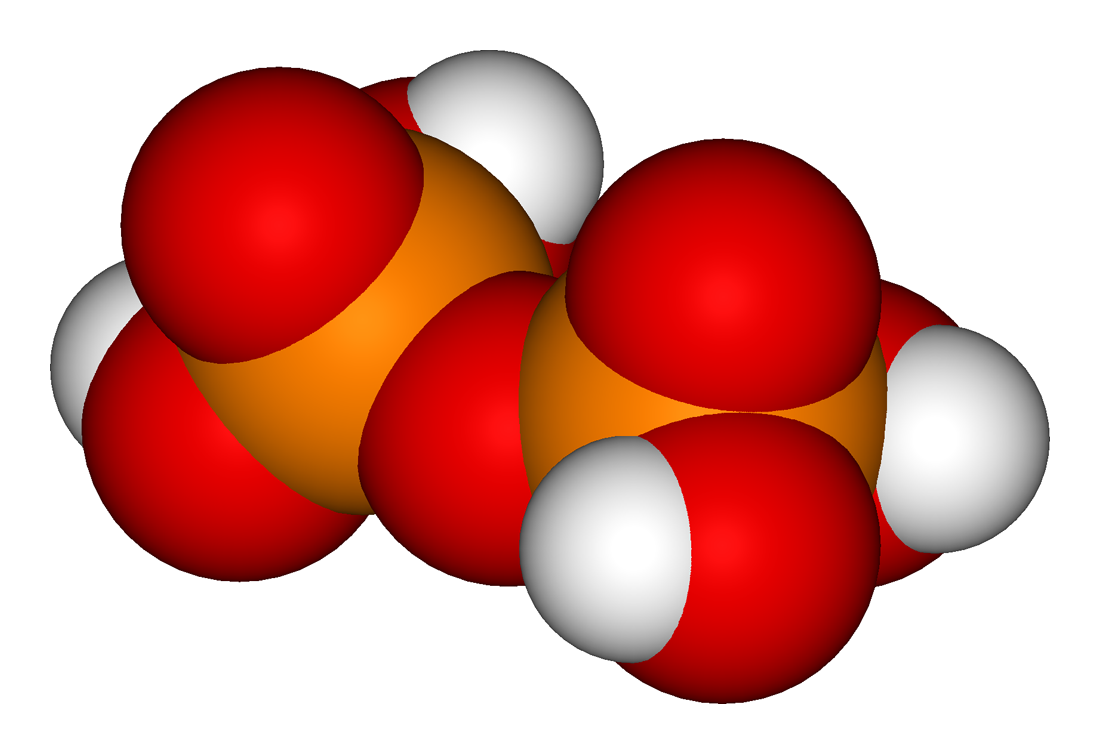
- 3D model of pyrophosphoric acid

Names
- IUPAC names Diphosphoric acid μ-oxido-bis(dihydroxidooxidophosphorus)
- Other names Pyrophosphoric acid Phosphonophosphoric acid Phosphono dihydrogenphosphate

Identifiers
CAS Number	2466-09-3
3D model (JSmol)	Interactive image
ChEBI	CHEBI:29888
ChEMBL	ChEMBL1160571
ChemSpider	996
DrugBank	DB04160
ECHA InfoCard	100.017.795
EC Number	219-574-0
Gmelin Reference	82619
IUPHAR/BPS	3151
KEGG	C00013
PubChem CID	1023
UNII	4E862E7GRQ
CompTox Dashboard (EPA)	DTXSID4075035
- InChI: InChI=1S/H4O7P2/c1-8(2,3)7-9(4,5)6/h(H2,1,2,3)(H2,4,5,6) Key: XPPKVPWEQAFLFU-UHFFFAOYSA-N; InChI=1/H4O7P2/c1-8(2,3)7-9(4,5)6/h(H2,1,2,3)(H2,4,5,6) Key: XPPKVPWEQAFLFU-UHFFFAOYAX
- SMILES: O=P(O)(O)OP(=O)(O)O

Properties
Chemical formula	H_{4}P_{2}O_{7}
Molar mass	177.97 g/mol
Melting point	71.5 °C (160.7 °F; 344.6 K)
Solubility in water	Extremely soluble
Solubility	Very soluble in alcohol, ether
Conjugate base	Pyrophosphate

Hazards
- GHS labelling
Pictograms	(GHS05: Corrosive) (GHS07: Exclamation mark)
Signal word	Danger
Hazard statements	H302, H314
Precautionary statements	P260, P264, P264+P265, P270, P280, P301+P317, P301+P330+P331, P302+P361+P354, P304+P340, P305+P354+P338, P316, P317, P321, P330, P363, P405, P501
- Except where otherwise noted, data are given for materials in their standard state (at 25 °C [77 °F], 100 kPa). verify (what is ?) Infobox references

Pyrophosphoric acid, also known as diphosphoric acid, is the inorganic compound with the formula H_{4}P_{2}O_{7} or, more descriptively, [(HO)_{2}P(O)]_{2}O. Colorful and odorless, it is soluble in water, diethyl ether, and ethyl alcohol. The anhydrous acid crystallizes in two polymorphs, which melt at 54.3 and 71.5 °C. The compound is a component of polyphosphoric acid, an important source of phosphoric acid. Anions, salts, and esters of pyrophosphoric acid are called pyrophosphates.

== Preparation ==
It can be prepared by reaction of phosphoric acid with phosphoryl chloride:

5 H_{3}PO_{4} + POCl_{3} → 3 H_{4}P_{2}O_{7} + 3 HCl

It can also be prepared by ion exchange from sodium pyrophosphate or by treating lead pyrophosphate with hydrogen sulfide.

== Reactions ==
Pyrophosphoric acid is a tetraprotic acid, with four distinct pKa's:

H_{4}P_{2}O_{7} ⇌ [H_{3}P_{2}O_{7}]^{−} + H^{+}, pKa = 0.85
[H_{3}P_{2}O_{7}]^{−} ⇌ [H_{2}P_{2}O_{7}]^{2−} + H^{+}, pKa = 1.96
[H_{2}P_{2}O_{7}]^{2−} ⇌ [HP_{2}O_{7}]^{3−} + H^{+}, pKa = 6.60
[HP_{2}O_{7}]^{3−} ⇌ [P_{2}O_{7}]^{4−} + H^{+}, pKa = 9.41

The pKa's occur in two distinct ranges because deprotonations occur on separate phosphate groups. For comparison with the pKa's for phosphoric acid are 2.14, 7.20, and 12.37.

At physiological pH's, pyrophosphate exists as a mixture of doubly and singly protonated forms.

When molten, pyrophosphoric acid rapidly converts to an equilibrium mixture of phosphoric acid, pyrophosphoric acid and polyphosphoric acids. The percentage by weight of pyrophosphoric acid is around 40% and it is difficult to recrystallise from the melt.

Even in cold water, pyrophosphoric acid hydrolyses to phosphoric acid. All polyphosphoric acids behave similarly.

H_{4}P_{2}O_{7} + H_{2}O → 2 H_{3}PO_{4}

== Safety ==
While pyrophosphoric acid is corrosive, it is not known to be otherwise toxic.

== History ==
The name pyrophosphoric acid was given by a "Mr. Clarke of Glasgow" in 1827 who is credited with its discovery following the heating to red heat of a sodium phosphate salt. It was found that phosphoric acid when heated to red heat formed pyrophosphoric acid that was readily converted to phosphoric acid by hot water.

== See also ==
- Disulfuric acid
- Sodium pyrophosphate
- Calcium pyrophosphate dihydrate deposition disease
- Dimethylallyl pyrophosphate
- ADP
- ATP
- Ortho acids
- triphosphoric acid
