= Phosphorus pentoxide =

Chemical compound

Phosphorus pentoxide
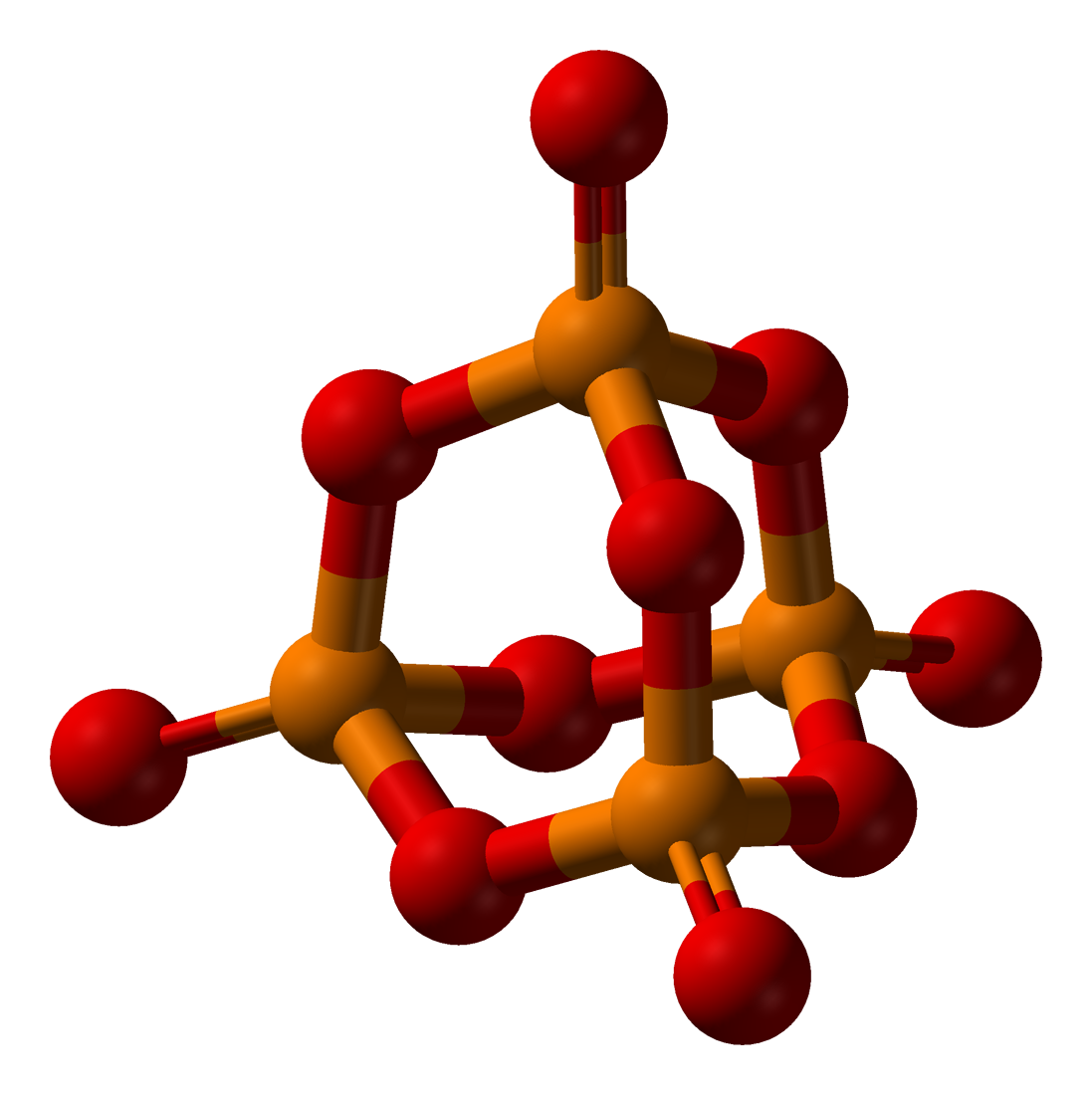
Phosphorus pentoxide
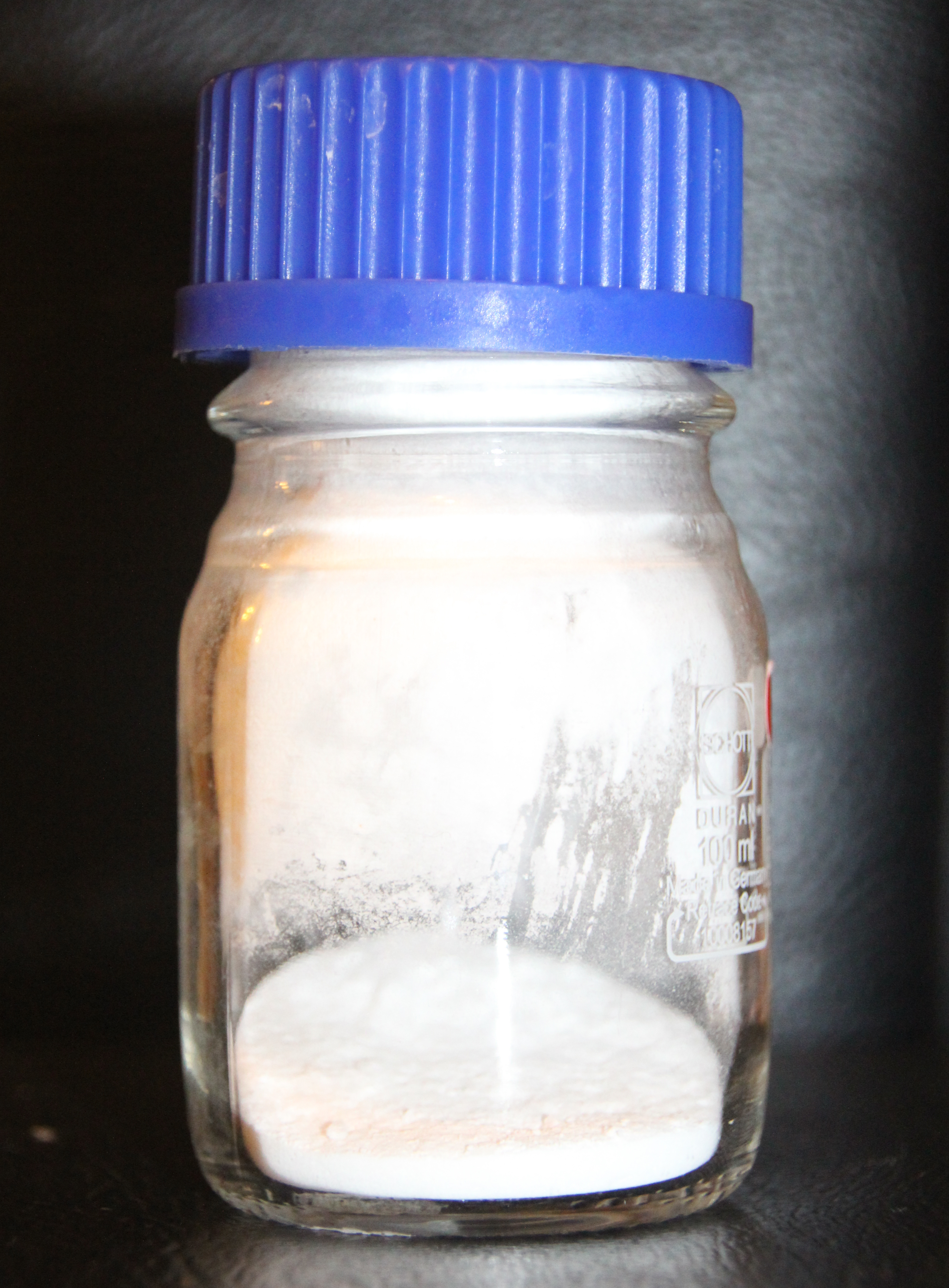

Names
- IUPAC name: Tetraphosphorus decaoxide; Tricyclo[3.3.1.1^{3,7}]tetraphosphoxane 1,3,5,7-tetraoxide
- Systematic IUPAC name 2,4,6,8,9,10-Hexaoxa-1λ^{5},3λ^{5},5λ^{5},7λ^{5}-tetraphosphatricyclo[3.3.1.1^{3,7}]decane 1,3,5,7-tetraoxide
- Other names: Diphosphorus pentoxide; Phosphorus(V) oxide; Phosphoric anhydride; Tetraphosphorus decaoxide; Tetraphosphorus decoxide

Identifiers
CAS Number	1314-56-3 (P_{2}O_{5}); 16752-60-6 (P_{4}O_{10})
3D model (JSmol)	molecular form: Interactive image; crystal o′ form: Interactive image
ChEBI	CHEBI:37376
ChemSpider	14128
ECHA InfoCard	100.013.852
PubChem CID	14812
RTECS number	TH3945000
UNII	51SWB7223J
CompTox Dashboard (EPA)	DTXSID701335584 DTXSID9047754, DTXSID701335584
- InChI: InChI=1S/O10P4/c1-11-5-12(2)8-13(3,6-11)10-14(4,7-11)9-12 Key: DLYUQMMRRRQYAE-UHFFFAOYSA-N
- SMILES: molecular form: O=P13OP2(=O)OP(=O)(O1)OP(=O)(O2)O3; crystal o′ form: P12(=O)OP3(=O)OP4(=O)OP5(=O)OP6(=O)OP(=O)(O1)OP7(=O)OP(=O)OP(=O)OP(=O)(O2)OP(=O)OP(=O)OP(=O)(O3)OP(=O)OP(=O)OP(=O)(O4)OP(=O)OP(=O)OP(=O)(O5)OP(=O)OP(=O)OP(=O)(O6)OP(=O)OP(=O)(O7)O

Properties
Chemical formula	P_{2}O_{5}
Molar mass	141.943 g·mol^{−1}
Appearance	White powder; Very deliquescent
Odor	Odorless
Density	2.3 g/cm^{3}
Melting point	562 °C (1,044 °F; 835 K) (sublimes)
Boiling point	605 °C (1,121 °F; 878 K) (if heated faster than sublimation can occur)
Solubility in water	Exothermic hydrolysis
Vapor pressure	1 Pa (0.00015 psi) (285 °C (545 °F), subl.); 1 kPa (0.15 psi) (434.4 °C (813.9 °F), subl.); 100 kPa (15 psi) (591 °C (1,096 °F))

Thermochemistry
Enthalpy of fusion (Δ_{f}H^{⦵}_{fus})	27.2 kJ⋅mol^{−1}

Hazards
- Occupational safety and health (OHS/OSH)
Main hazards	Reacts with water, strong dehydrating agent, corrosive.
- GHS labelling
Pictograms	(GHS05: Corrosive)
Signal word	Danger
Hazard statements	H314
Precautionary statements	P260, P264, P280, P301+P330+P331, P303+P361+P353, P304+P340+P310, P305+P351+P338+P310, P363, P405, P501
NFPA 704 (fire diamond)	3 0 1 W
- Lethal dose or concentration (LD, LC)
LC_{50} (median concentration)	1217 mg/m^{3} (rat, 1h)
Safety data sheet (SDS)	"SDS - Phosphorous pentoxide". Version 6.20. St. Louis, MO: Sigma-Aldrich. 9 July 2026.
- Except where otherwise noted, data are given for materials in their standard state (at 25 °C [77 °F], 100 kPa). Infobox references

Phosphorus pentoxide is a chemical compound with molecular formula P_{4}O_{10} (with its common name derived from its empirical formula, P_{2}O_{5}). This white crystalline solid is the anhydride of phosphoric acid. It is a powerful desiccant and dehydrating agent.

== Structure ==
Phosphorus pentoxide crystallizes in at least four forms or polymorphs. The most familiar one, a metastable form (shown in the figure), comprises molecules of P_{4}O_{10}. Weak van der Waals forces hold these molecules together in a hexagonal lattice, however, in spite of the high symmetry of the molecules, the crystal packing is not a close packing. The structure of the P_{4}O_{10} cage is reminiscent of adamantane with T_{d} symmetry point group. It is closely related to the corresponding anhydride of phosphorous acid, phosphorus trioxide (P_{4}O_{6}, which lacks terminal oxo groups). Its density is 2.30 g/cm^{3}. It boils at 423 °C (793 °F) under atmospheric pressure; if heated more rapidly it can sublimate. This form can be made by condensing the vapor of phosphorus pentoxide rapidly, and the result is an extremely hygroscopic solid.

The other polymorphs are polymeric, but in each case the phosphorus atoms are bound by a tetrahedron of oxygen atoms, one of which forms a terminal P=O bond involving the donation of the terminal oxygen p-orbital electrons to the antibonding phosphorus-oxygen single bonds. The macromolecular form can be made by heating the compound in a sealed tube for several hours, and maintaining the melt at a high temperature before cooling the melt to the solid. The metastable orthorhombic "O"-form (density 2.72 g/cm^{3}, melting point 562 °C (1,044 °F)) adopts a layered structure consisting of interconnected P_{6}O_{6} rings, not unlike the structure adopted by certain polysilicates.

The stable form is a higher density phase, also orthorhombic, the so-called O′ form. It consists of a 3-dimensional framework, density 3.5 g/cm^{3}. The remaining polymorph is a glass or amorphous form; it can be made by fusing any of the others.

Part of an o′−(P_{2}O_{5})_{∞} layer	o′−(P_{2}O_{5})_{∞} layers stacking

== Preparation ==
P_{4}O_{10} is prepared by burning white phosphorus with a sufficient supply of oxygen:

P_{4} + 5 O_{2} → P_{4}O_{10}

The dehydration of phosphoric acid to give phosphorus pentoxide is not possible, as on heating it forms various polyphosphates but will not dehydrate sufficiently to form P_{4}O_{10}.

== Applications ==
Phosphorus pentoxide is a potent dehydrating agent as indicated by the exothermic nature of its hydrolysis producing phosphoric acid:

P_{4}O_{10} + 6 H_{2}O → 4 H_{3}PO_{4} (−177 kJ)

However, its utility for drying is limited somewhat by its tendency to form a protective viscous coating that inhibits further dehydration by unspent material. A granular form of P_{4}O_{10} is used in desiccators.

Consistent with its strong desiccating power, P_{4}O_{10} is used in organic synthesis for dehydration. The most important application is for the conversion of primary amides into nitriles:

P_{4}O_{10} + RC(O)NH_{2} → P_{4}O_{9}(OH)_{2} + RCN

The indicated coproduct P_{4}O_{9}(OH)_{2} is an idealized formula for undefined products resulting from the hydration of P_{4}O_{10}.

Alternatively, when combined with a carboxylic acid, the result is the corresponding anhydride:

P_{4}O_{10} + RCO_{2}H → P_{4}O_{9}(OH)_{2} + [RC(O)]_{2}O

The "Onodera reagent", a solution of P_{4}O_{10} in Dimethyl sulfoxide (DMSO), is employed for the oxidation of alcohols. This reaction is reminiscent of the Swern oxidation.

The desiccating power of P_{4}O_{10} is strong enough to convert many mineral acids to their anhydrides. Examples:

- Nitric acid (HNO_{3}) is converted to dinitrogen pentoxide (N_{2}O_{5}).
- Sulfuric acid (H_{2}SO_{4} is converted to sulfur trioxide (SO_{3}.
- Perchloric acid (HClO_{4}) is converted to dichlorine heptoxide (Cl_{2}O_{7}).
- Triflic acid (CF_{3}SO_{3}H) is converted to Triflic anhydride ((CF_{3})_{2}S_{2}O_{5}.

=== As a proxy measurement ===
P_{2}O_{5} content is often used by industry as proxy value for all the phosphorus oxides in a material. For example, fertilizer grade phosphoric acid can also contain various related phosphorous compounds which are also of use. All these compounds are described collectively in terms of 'P_{2}O_{5} content' to allow convenient comparison of the phosphorous content of different products. Despite this, phosphorus pentoxide is not actually present in most samples as it is not stable in aqueous solutions.

== Hazards ==
Phosphorus pentoxide itself is not flammable. Just like sulfur trioxide, it reacts vigorously with water and water-containing substances like wood or cotton, liberates much heat and may even cause fire due to the highly exothermic nature of such reactions. It is corrosive to metal and is very irritating – it may cause severe burns to the eye, skin, mucous membrane, and respiratory tract even at concentrations as low as 1 mg/m^{3}.

== See also ==
- Various other phosphorus oxides
- Eaton's reagent
