= Phosphoric acids and phosphates =

Class of chemical species; phosphorus oxoacids and their deprotonated derivatives

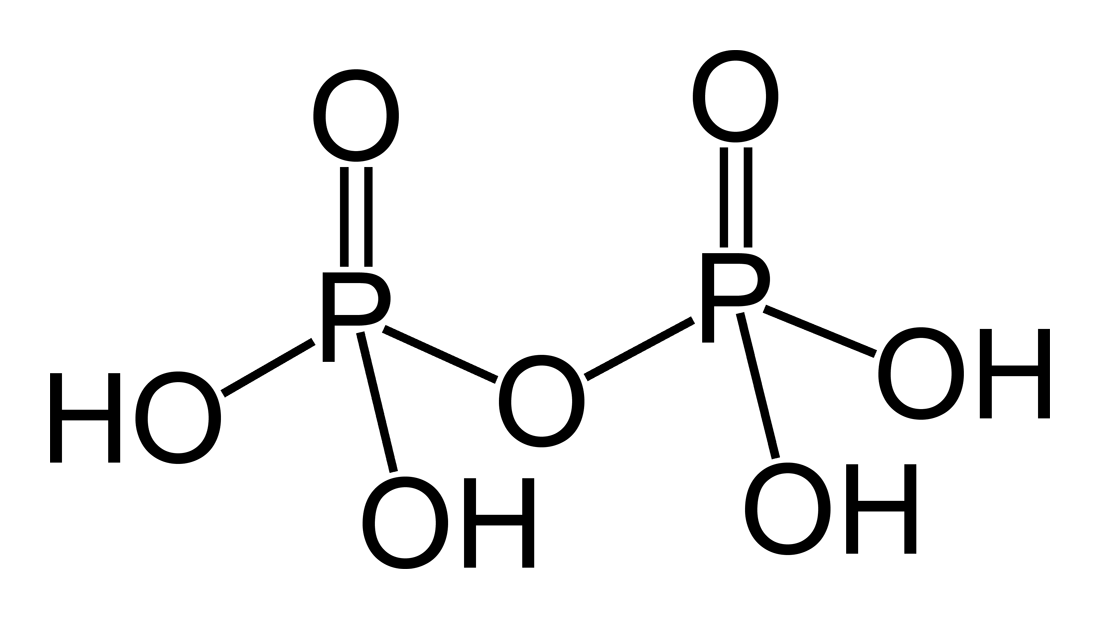
Pyrophosphoric acid.

In chemistry, a phosphoric acid, in the general sense, is a phosphorus oxoacid in which each phosphorus (P) atom is in the oxidation state +5, and is bonded to four oxygen (O) atoms, one of them through a double bond, arranged as the corners of a tetrahedron. Two or more of these PO_{4} tetrahedra may be connected by shared single-bonded oxygens, forming linear or branched chains, cycles, or more complex structures. The single-bonded oxygen atoms that are not shared are completed with acidic hydrogen atoms. The general formula of a phosphoric acid is H_{n+2−2x}P_{n}O_{3n+1−x}, where n is the number of phosphorus atoms and x is the number of fundamental cycles in the molecule's structure, between 0 and (n + 2)/2.

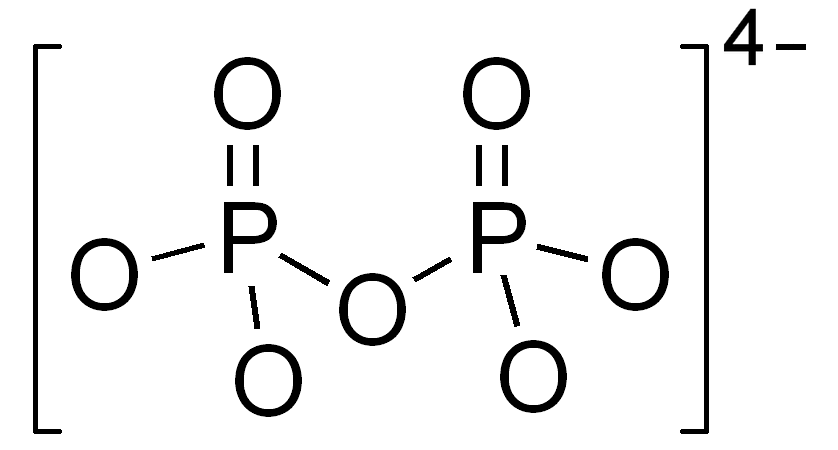
Pyrophosphate anion.

Trimethyl orthophosphate.

Removal of protons (H^{+}) from k hydroxyl groups –OH leaves anions generically called phosphates (if k = n − 2x + 2) or hydrogen phosphates (if k is between 1 and n − 2x + 1), with general formula [H_{n−2x+2−k}P_{n}O_{3n+1−x}]^{k−}. The fully dissociated anion (k = n − 2x + 2) has formula [P_{n}O_{3n−x+1}]^{(n−2x+2)−}. The term phosphate is also used in organic chemistry for the functional groups that result when one or more of the hydrogens are replaced by bonds to other groups.

These acids, together with their salts and esters, include some of the best-known compounds of phosphorus, of high importance in biochemistry, mineralogy, agriculture, pharmacy, chemical industry, and chemical research.

== Acids ==
=== Phosphoric acid ===
The simplest and most commonly encountered of the phosphoric acids is orthophosphoric acid, H_{3}PO_{4}. Indeed, the term phosphoric acid often means this compound specifically (and this is also the current IUPAC nomenclature).

=== Oligophosphoric and polyphosphoric acids ===
Polyphosphoric acid

Two or more orthophosphoric acid molecules can be joined by condensation into larger molecules by elimination of water. Condensation of a few units yields the oligophosphoric acids, while larger molecules are called polyphosphoric acids. (However, the distinction between the two terms is not well defined.)

For example, pyrophosphoric, triphosphoric and tetraphosphoric acids can be obtained by the reactions
$$\begin{align}
\ce{2 H3PO4} &\longrightarrow \ce{H4P2O7 + H2O} \\[2pt]
\ce{H4P2O7 + H3PO4} &\longrightarrow \ce{H5P3O10 + H2O} \\[2pt]
\ce{H5P3O10 + H3PO4} &\longrightarrow \ce{H6P4O13 + H2O}
\end{align}$$

The "backbone" of a polyphosphoric acid molecule is a chain of alternating P and O atoms. Each extra orthophosphoric unit that is condensed adds 1 extra H (hydrogen) atom, 1 extra P (phosphorus) atom, and 3 extra O (oxygen) atoms. The general formula of a polyphosphoric acid is H_{n+2}P_{n}O_{3n+1} or HO[−P(O)(OH)−O−]_{n}H.

Polyphosphoric acids are used in organic synthesis for cyclizations and acylations; an alternative is Eaton's reagent.

=== Metaphosphoric acid ===
Metaphosphoric acid (HPO_{3}) is a colorless, vitreous, deliquescent solid, density 2.2 to 2.5 g/cc, which sublimes upon heating. It is soluble in ethanol.

=== Cyclic phosphoric acids ===
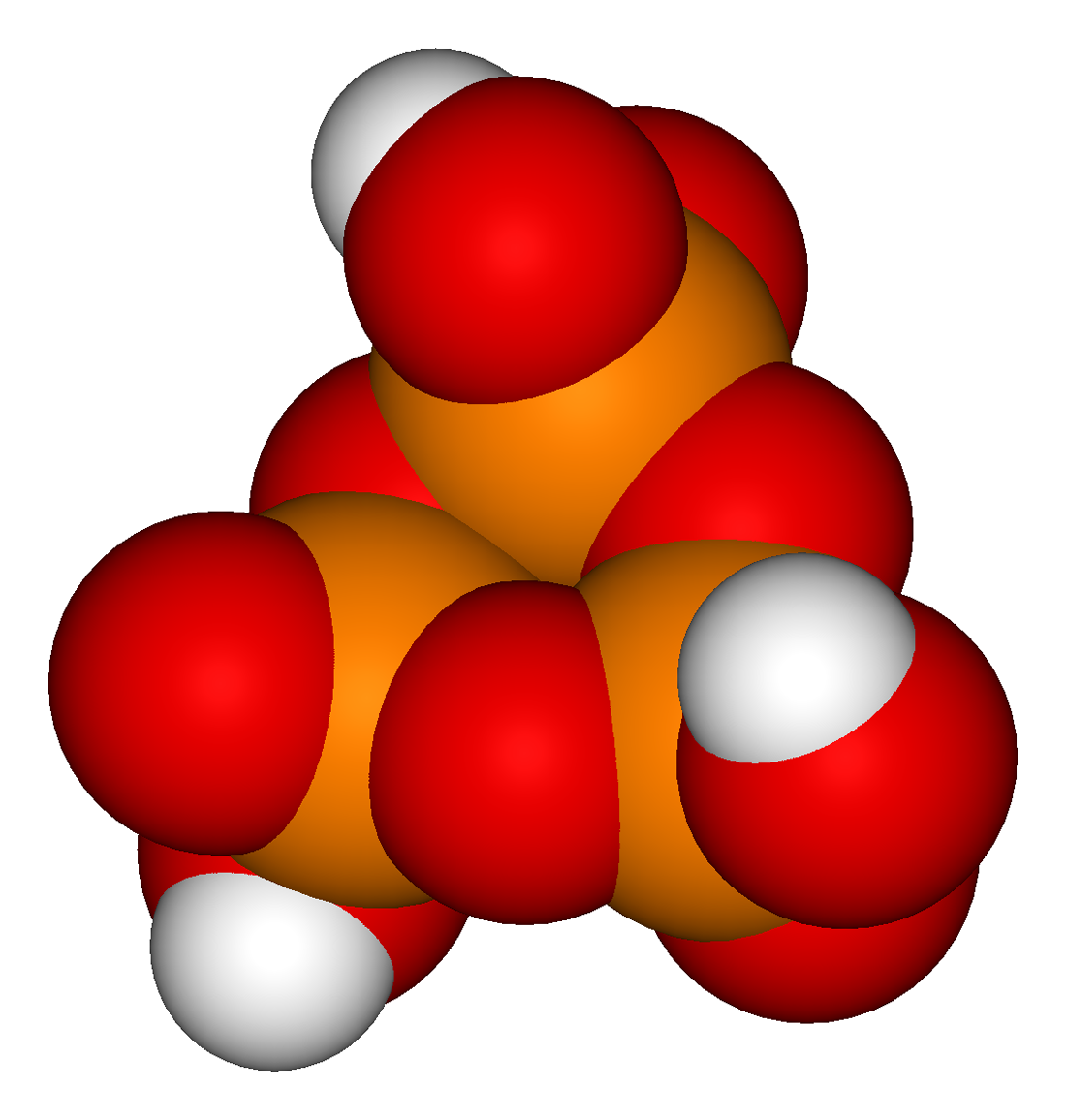
Trimetaphosphoric acid

Phosphoric acid units can be bonded together in rings (cyclic structures). The simplest such compound is trimetaphosphoric acid or cyclo-triphosphoric acid having the formula H_{3}P_{3}O_{9}. Its structure is shown in the illustration. Since the ends are condensed, its formula has one less H_{2}O (water) than tripolyphosphoric acid.

The general formula of a phosphoric acid is H_{n−2x+2}P_{n}O_{3n−x+1}, where n is the number of phosphorus atoms and x is the number of fundamental cycles in the molecule's structure; that is, the minimum number of bonds that would have to be broken to eliminate all cycles.

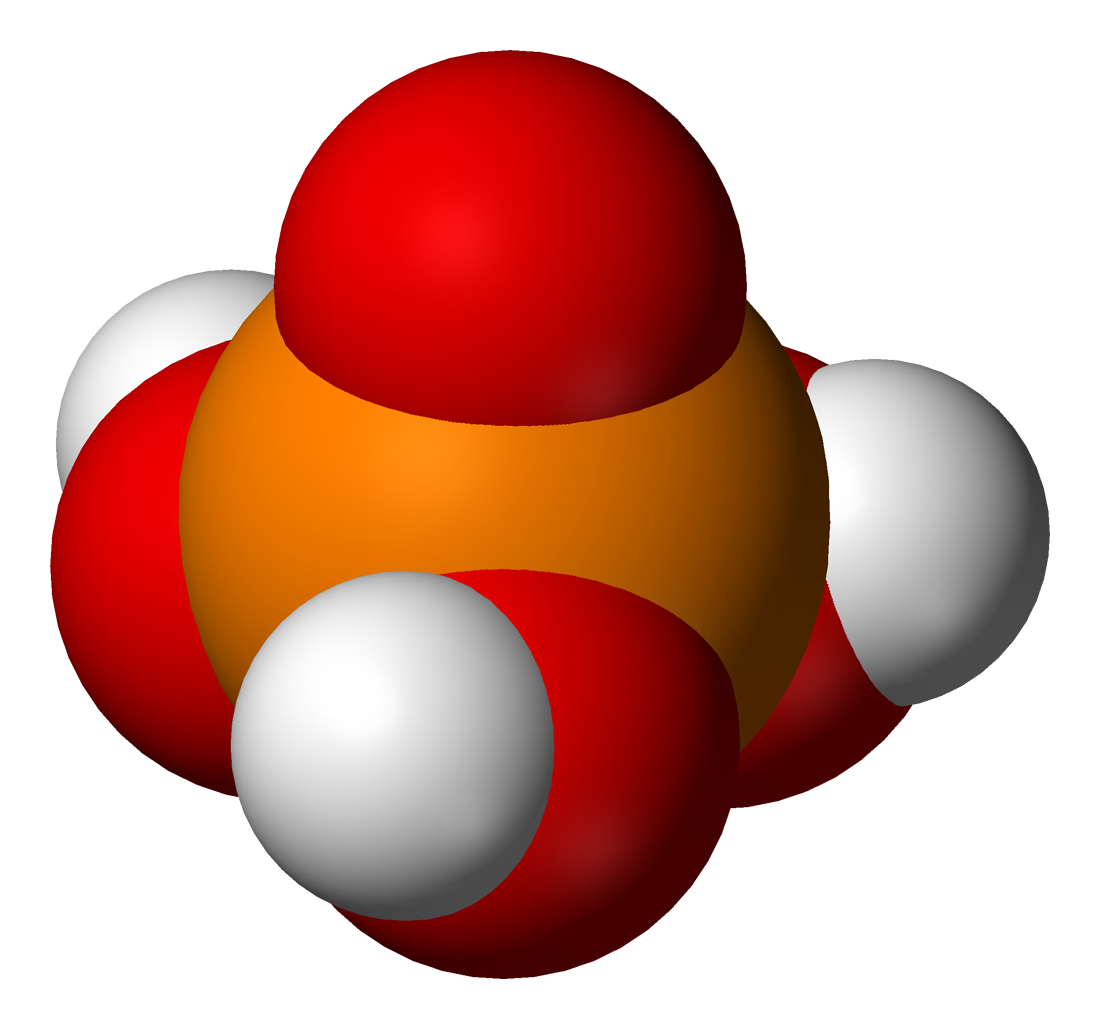
Orthophosphoric acid
H_{3}PO_{4}

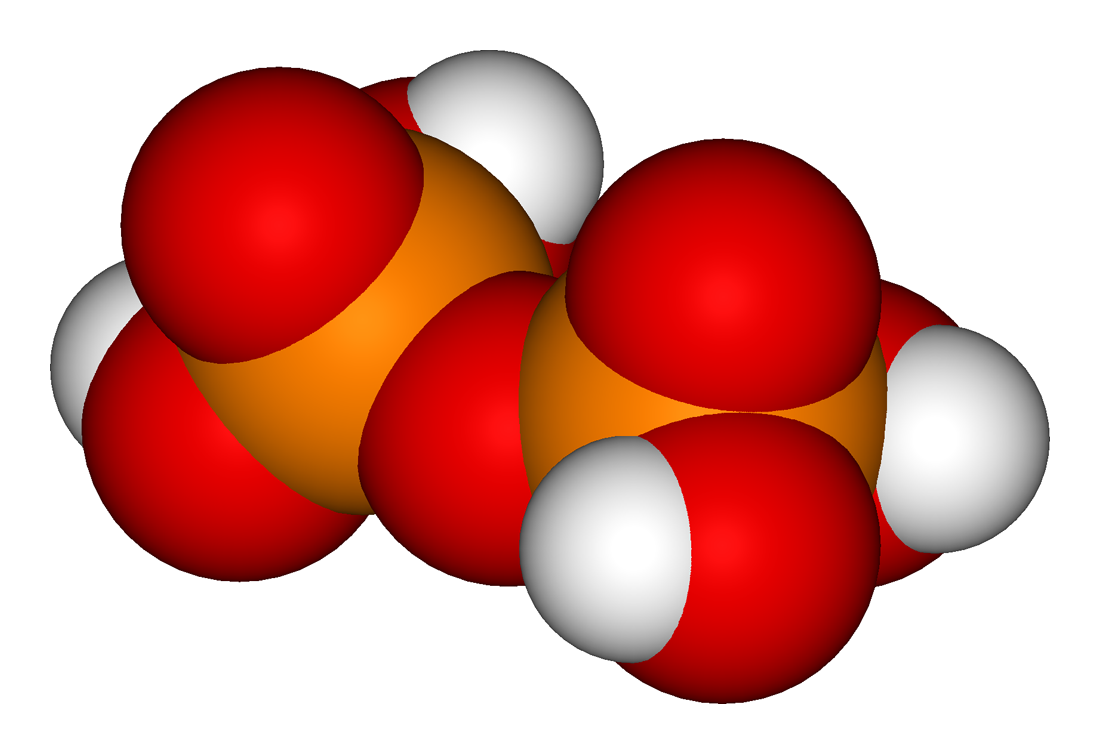
Pyrophosphoric acid
H_{4}P_{2}O_{7}

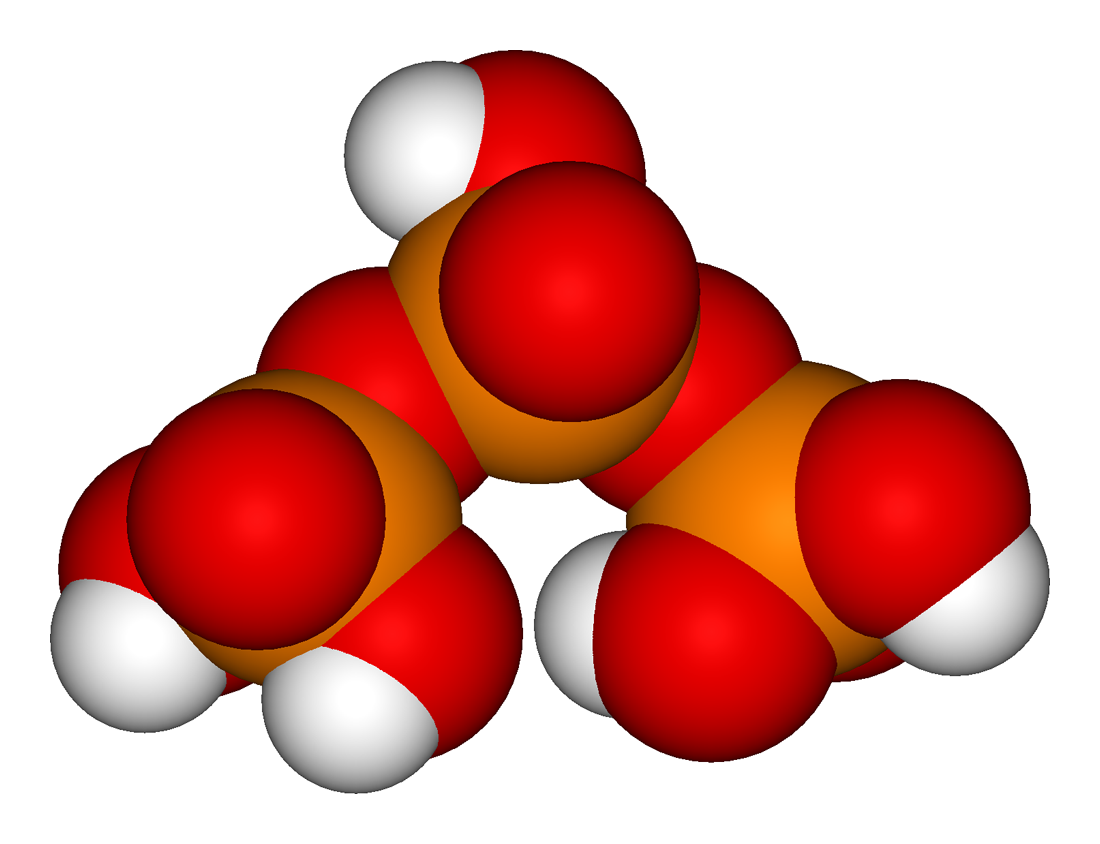
Tripolyphosphoric acid
H_{5}P_{3}O_{10}

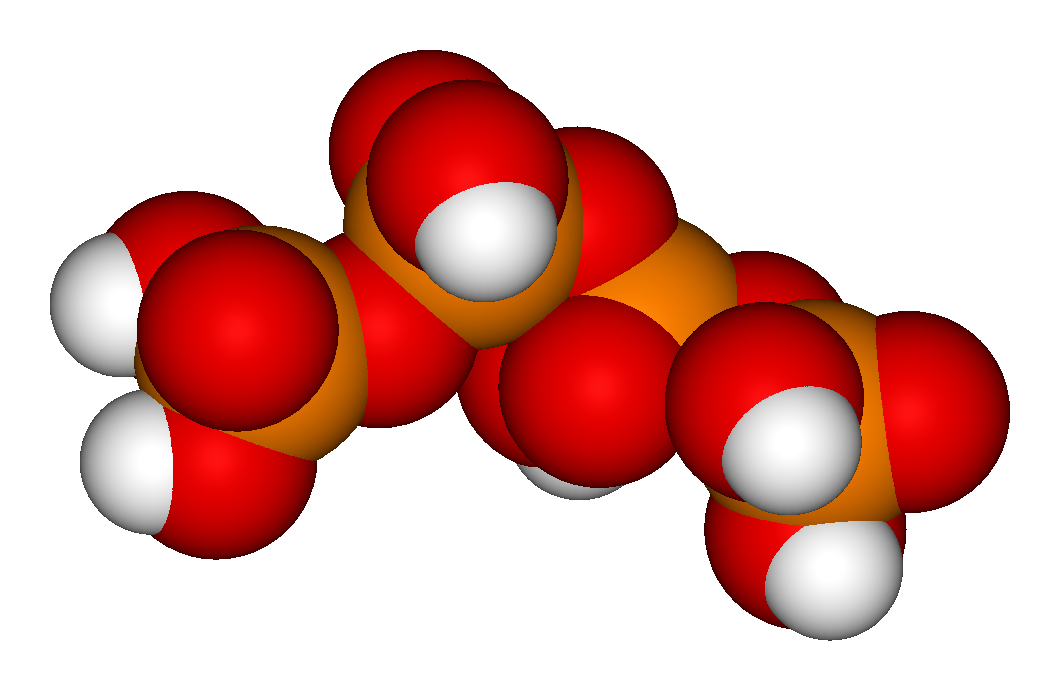
Tetrapolyphosphoric acid
H_{6}P_{4}O_{13}

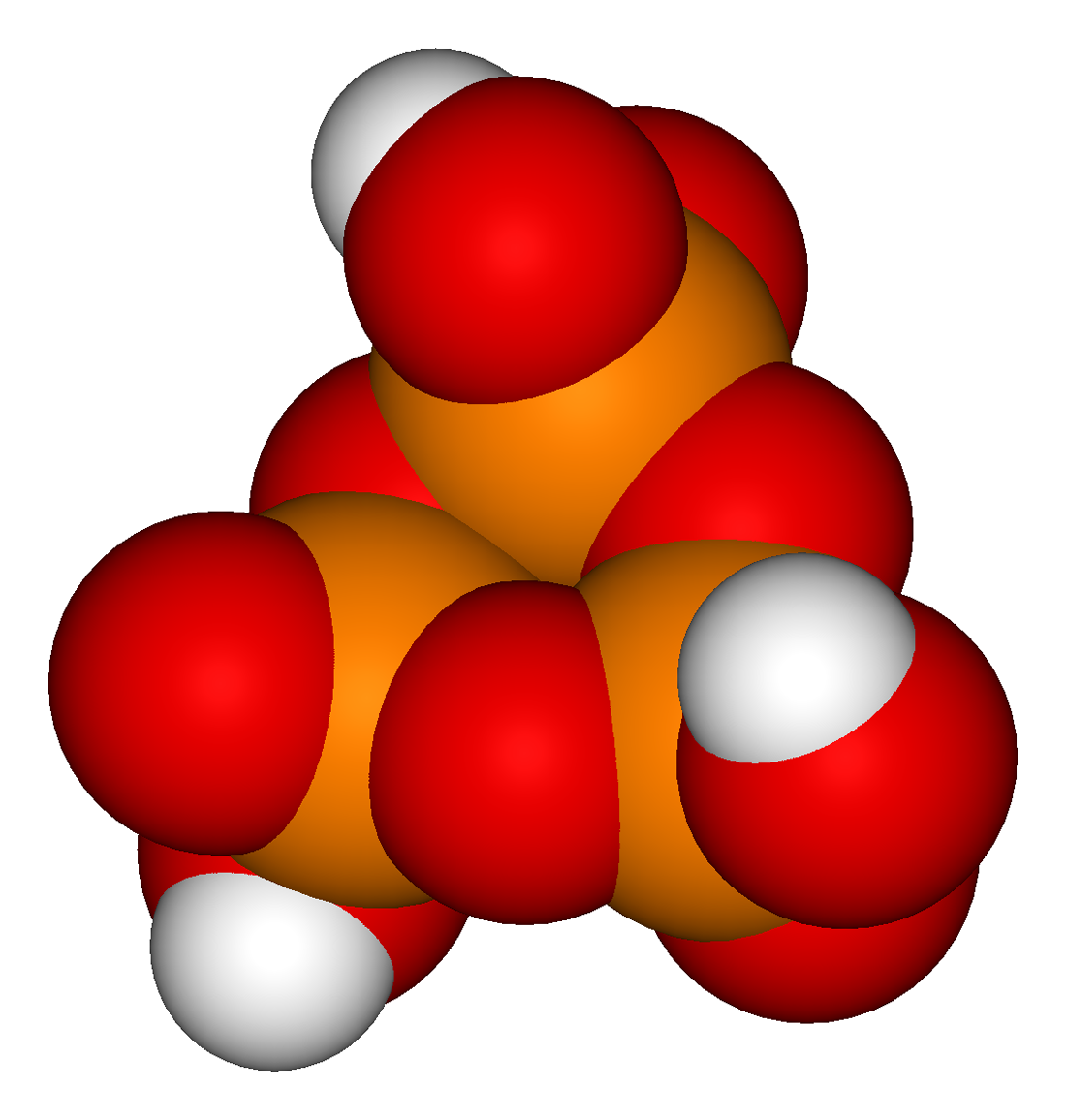
Trimetaphosphoric acid
H_{3}P_{3}O_{9}

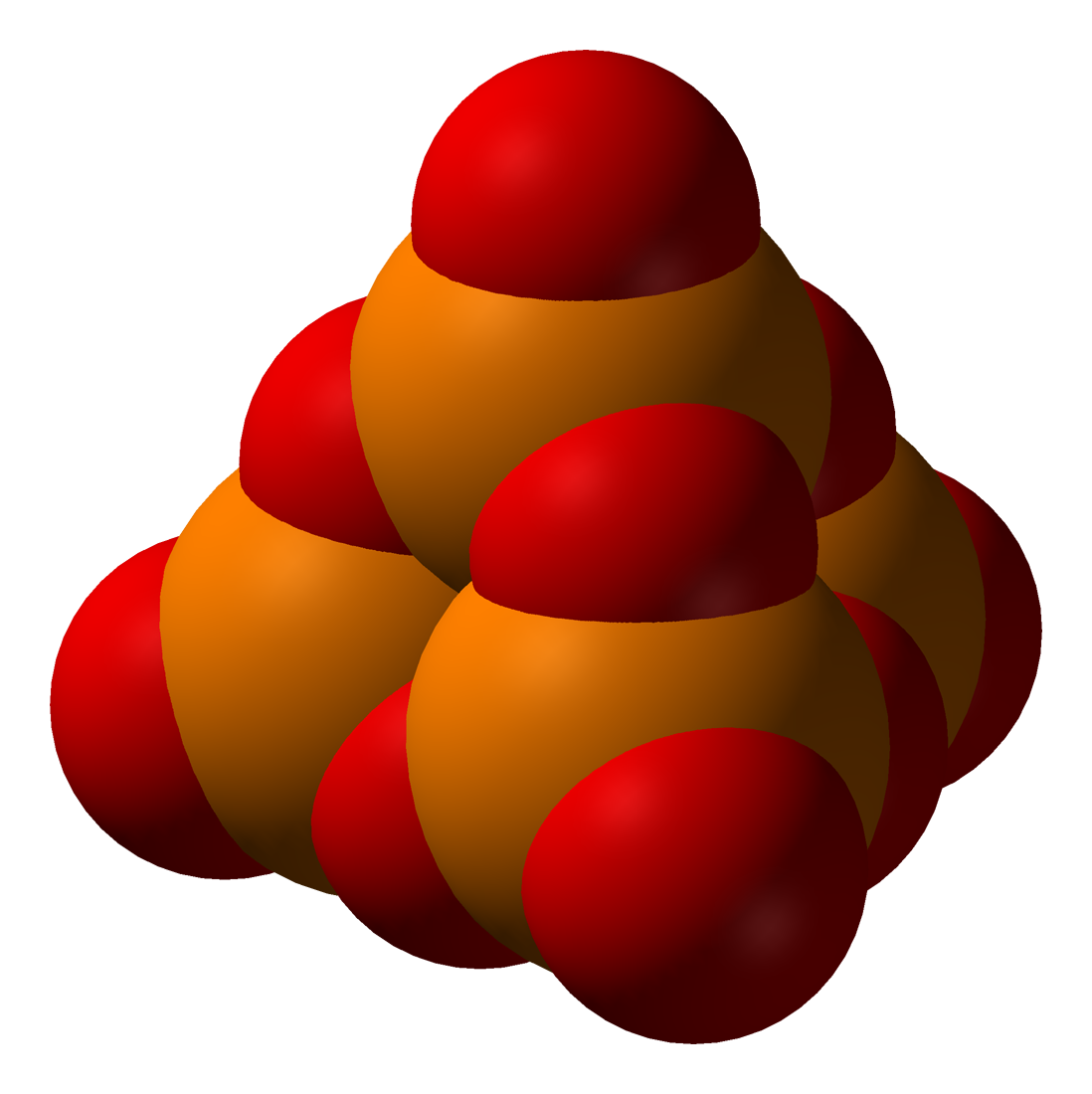
Phosphoric anhydride
P_{4}O_{10}

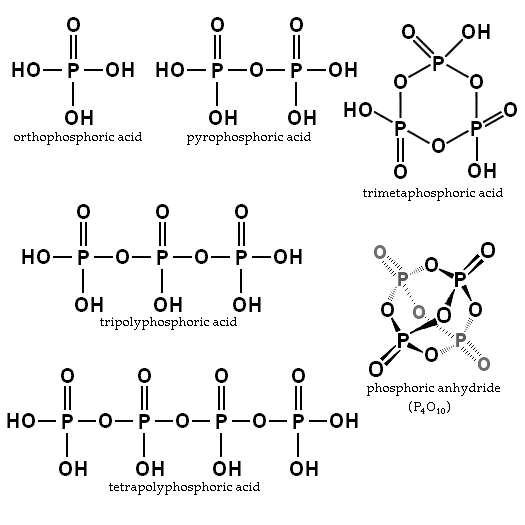

The limiting case of internal condensation, where all oxygen atoms are shared and there are no hydrogen atoms (x = (n+2)/2) is an anhydride P_{2n}O_{5n}, phosphorus pentoxide P_{4}O_{10}.

== Phosphates ==
Removal of the hydrogen atoms as protons H^{+} turns a phosphoric acid into a phosphate anion. Partial removal yields various hydrogen phosphate anions.

=== Orthophosphate ===
The anions of orthophosphoric acid H_{3}PO_{4} are orthophosphate (commonly called simply "phosphate") PO^{3−}_{4}, monohydrogen phosphate HPO^{2−}_{4}, and dihydrogen phosphate H_{2}PO^{−}_{4}.

=== Linear oligophosphates and polyphosphates ===
Dissociation of pyrophosphoric acid H_{4}P_{2}O_{7} generates four anions, [H_{4−k}P_{2}O_{7}]^{k−}, where the charge k ranges from 1 to 4. The last one is pyrophosphate [P_{2}O_{7}]^{4−}. The pyrophosphates are mostly water-soluble.

Likewise, tripolyphosphoric acid H_{5}P_{3}O_{10} yields at least five anions [H_{5−k}P_{3}O_{10}]^{k−}, where k ranges from 1 to 5, including tripolyphosphate [P_{3}O_{10}]^{5−}. Tetrapolyphosphoric acid H_{6}P_{4}O_{13} yields at least six anions, including tetrapolyphosphate [P_{4}O_{13}]^{6−}, and so on. Note that each extra phosphoric unit adds one extra P atom, three extra O atoms, and either one extra hydrogen atom or an extra negative charge.

Branched polyphosphoric acids give similarly branched polyphosphate anions. The simplest example of this is triphosphono phosphate [OP(OPO_{3})_{3}]^{9−} and its partially dissociated versions.

The general formula for such (non-cyclic) polyphosphate anions, linear or branched, is [H_{n+2−k}P_{n}O_{3n+1}]^{k−}, where the charge k may vary from 1 to n + 2. Generally in an aqueous solution, the degree or percentage of dissociation depends on the pH of the solution.

=== Cyclic polyphosphates ===
Salts or esters of cyclic polyphosphoric acids are often called "metaphosphates". What are commonly called trimetaphosphates actually have a mixture of ring sizes. A general formula for such cyclic compounds is [HPO_{3}]_{x} where x = number of phosphoric units in the molecule.

When metaphosphoric acids lose their hydrogens as H^{+}, cyclic anions called metaphosphates are formed. An example of a compound with such an anion is sodium hexametaphosphate (Na_{6}P_{6}O_{18}), used as a sequestrant and a food additive.

=== Chemical properties ===
==== Solubility ====
These phosphoric acids series are generally water-soluble considering the polarity of the molecules. Ammonium and alkali phosphates are also quite soluble in water. The alkaline earth salts start becoming less soluble and phosphate salts of various other metals are even less soluble.

==== Hydrolysis and condensation ====
In aqueous solutions (solutions of water), water gradually (over the course of hours) hydrolyzes polyphosphates into smaller phosphates and finally into ortho-phosphate, given enough water. Higher temperature or acidic conditions can speed up the hydrolysis reactions considerably.

Conversely, polyphosphoric acids or polyphosphates are often formed by dehydrating a phosphoric acid solution; in other words, removing water from it often by heating and evaporating the water off.

=== Uses ===
Ortho-, pyro-, and tripolyphosphate compounds, such as sodium tripolyphosphate, have been commonly used in detergents (i. e. cleaners) formulations. Sometimes pyrophosphate, tripolyphosphate, tetrapolyphosphate, etc. are called diphosphate, triphosphate, tetraphosphate, etc., especially when they are part of phosphate esters in biochemistry. They are also used for scale and corrosion control by potable water providers. As a corrosion inhibitor, polyphosphates work by forming a protective film on the interior surface of pipes.

== Phosphate esters ==
General chemical structure of a monophosphate ester; here any R can be H or some organic radical.

The −OH groups in phosphoric acids can also condense with the hydroxyl groups of alcohols to form phosphate esters. Since orthophosphoric acid has three −OH groups, it can esterify with one, two, or three alcohol molecules to form a mono-, di-, or triester. See the general structure image of an ortho- (or mono-) phosphate ester below on the left, where any of the R groups can be a hydrogen or an organic radical. Di- and tripoly- (or tri-) phosphate esters, etc. are also possible. Any −OH groups on the phosphates in these ester molecules may lose H^{+} ions to form anions, again depending on the pH in a solution. In the biochemistry of living organisms, there are many kinds of (mono)phosphate, diphosphate, and triphosphate compounds (essentially esters), many of which play a significant role in metabolism such as adenosine diphosphate (ADP) and triphosphate (ATP).

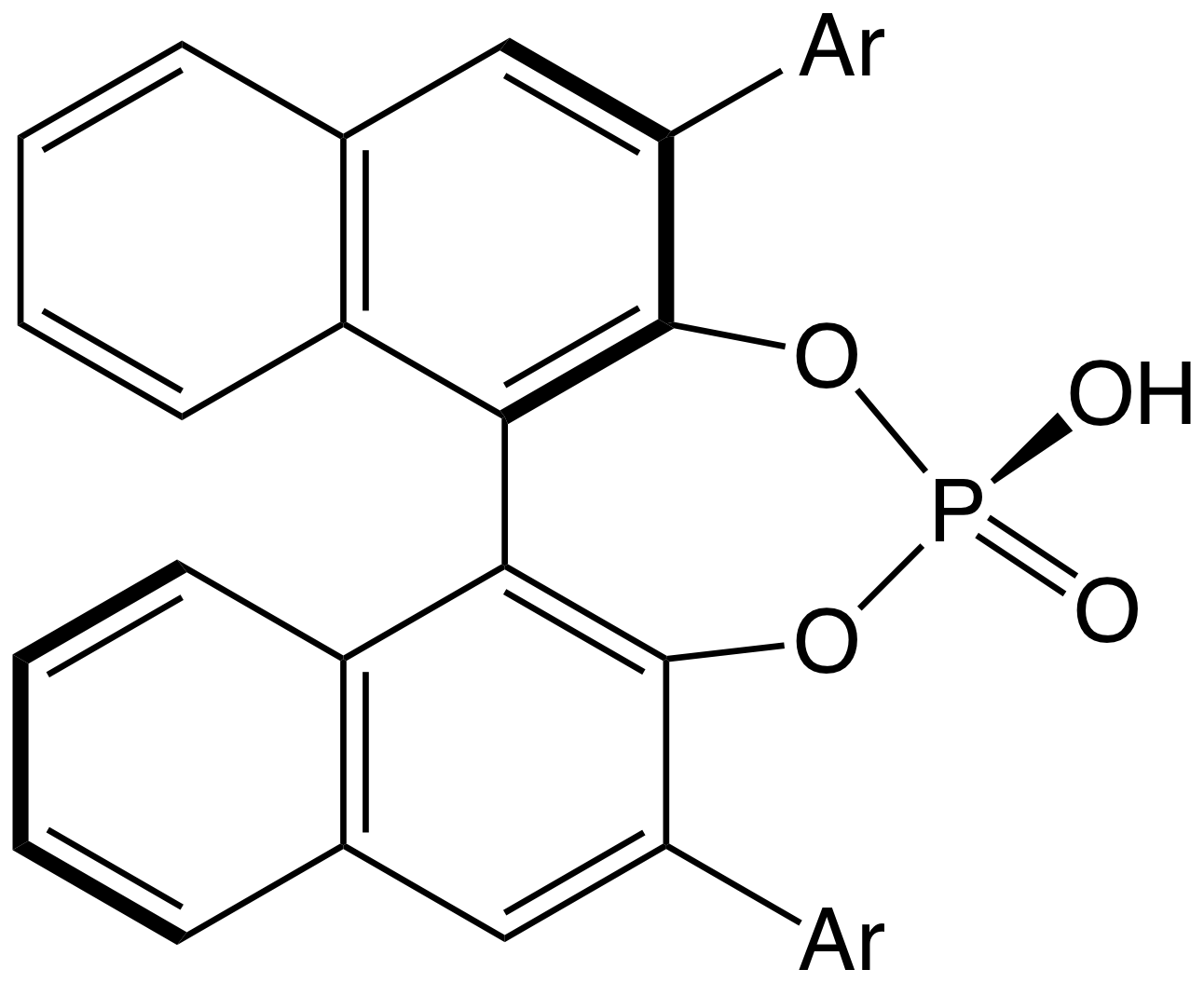
Structure of a chiral phosphoric acid derived from BINOL.

== See also ==
- Adenosine monophosphate
- Adenosine diphosphate
- Adenosine triphosphate
- Adenosine tetraphosphate
- Nucleoside triphosphate
- Organophosphate
- Phosphonic acid
- Phosphoramidate
- Ribonucleoside monophosphate
- Superphosphate
