= Chitosan nanoparticles =

Nanoparticle used for drug delivery

Chitosan nanoparticles are nanoparticles that contain chitosan or its derivative(s). Like chitosan, they are biocompatible, biodegradable, and cationic in nature. They are relatively non-toxic. A wide variety of chitosan nanoparticles have been made, with researchers grafting different molecules onto the chitosan backbone to give it more useful properties:

- Poly(acrylic acid) (PAA) is a weak anionic polyelectrolyte used in many biocompatible gels. Linking it covalently with chitosan creates chitosan–polyacrylic acid (chitosan-PAA), a material that combines the advantages of both: it has better adhesion property than chitosan and better biocompatibility than polyacrylic acid. A similar combination is done with poly(methacrylic acid).
- Poly(lactide-co-glycolide) (PLGA) is a biodegradable synthetic polymer often used to guide tissue growth in the form of a membrane. Chitosan-PLGA microspheres act as good scaffolds for bone growth in rabbits.
- The structure of chitosan nanoparticles can be modified by crosslinking using phosphates, specifically tripolyphosphate (TPP), phytic acid, or sodium hexametaphosphate. This affects the product's physical and chemical properties.

The same principle is applied to other nanomaterial forms such as nanofibers. For example, chitosan-poly(caprolactone) (chitosan-PCL) combines the biological properties of chitosan and the mechanical integrity and stability of PCL.

== Background ==
Research on nanoparticles and their chitosan nanoparticles grew in popularity in the early 1990s. mainly due to its biodegradability and biocompatibility nature. Chitosan, due to its molecular structure, can be dissolved well within a variety of solvents and a variety of biologics, such as acids like formic and lactic acid. Additionally, a benefit of chitosan is its ability to be greatly modified such as with other natural materials, synthetic materials, ligands, and even functionalized with various techniques. Such an experience can be seen with the synthesis with poly-(acrylic acid) devices. The addition of poly-(acrylic acid) can allow for an interaction to induce amphiphilicity and be spontaneously assembled. This can be important due to the beneficial impact on its stimuli responsiveness and for large-scale use.

== Structure ==
=== Chitosan ===
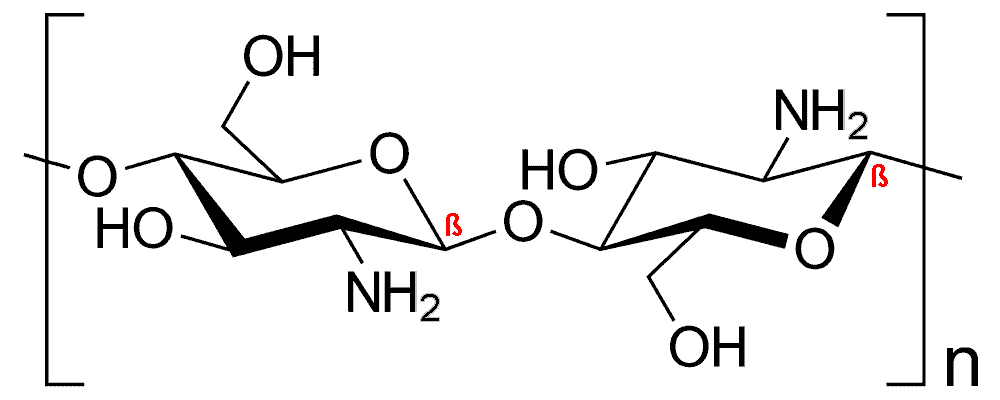
Chemical structure of chitosan

Chitosan is a polysaccharide that is derived from chitin that is composed of an alkaline deacetylated monomer of glucosamine and an acetylated monomor glucosamine and binding through β-1,4 glycosidic and hydrogen bonds. The benefit of chitosan comes from their reactive groups such as -OH and -NH_{2}. Various mechanisms for chitosan exist, and various isolation techniques can be issued for the fabrication of chitosan nanoparticles.

== Synthesis ==
There are various mechanisms for chitosan nanoparticle synthesis. These mechanisms include ionic gelation/polyelectrolyte complexation, emulsion droplet coalescence, emulsion solvent diffusion, reverse miscellisation, desolvation, emulsification cross-linking, nanoprecipitation, and spray-drying.

=== Ionic gelation/polyelectrolyte complexation ===
Ionic gelation/polyelectrolyte complexation involves converting cationic chitosan solution with anionic tripolyphosphate and collecting precipitate in the form of nanoparticles.

==== Ionic gelation with radical polymerization ====
Poly(acrylic acid) refers to acrylic acid that is polymerized. Poly(acrylic acid) is also known to have a neutral pH, have beneficial crosslinking properties, due to the charge properties of the side changes and poly(acrylic acid) being anionic 1,11–13,21,22. Poly (acrylic acid) is known to have good biocompatibility with chitosan, particularly with the amine groups (-NH_{2})

Ionic gelation with radical polymerization takes in a chitosan solution after through the addition of an acid monomer, the chitosan changes from the anion of an acrylic monomer. The nanoparticles are then derived after being self-settled overnight, and the unreacted monomer is removed. This is the main method for the formulation of poly (acrylic acid) based chitosan nanoparticles.

An alternative method for the fabrication of chitosan nanoparticles includes the inclusion of polymerized groups of chitosan. This methodology can allow for the improvement of the chitosan cross-linking mechanism and improve overall drug release profiles for drugs such as amoxicillin and meloxicam. Additionally, when poly (acrylic acid) is localized within the inner shell, overall drug encapsulation can be improved.

=== Emulsion droplet coalescence ===
Emulsion droplet coalescence involves the formulation of chitosan nanoparticles by creating two stable emulsions with liquid paraffin by adding one with a stabilizer and another with sodium hydroxide again containing a stabilizer. This mixture of the two emulsions can be used to form nanoparticles.

=== Emulsion solvent diffusion ===
Emulsion solvent diffusion takes chitosan with stabilizer mixed in with an organic solvent such as methylene chloride/acetone that contains a drug that is hydrophilic and is diffused with acetone and chitosan nanoparticles are derived via centrifugation.

=== Reverse miscellisation ===
Reverse miscellisation involves taking an organic solvent lipophilic surfactant and adding chitosan with a drug and cross-linker like glutaraldehyde. The nanoparticles are then extracted.

=== Desolvation ===
Desolvation includes preparing chitosan solution and adding a precipitate with a stabilizing solution and precipitate such as acetone. Due to the insolubility of chitosan, the precipitate begins to form through the elimination of the liquid surrounding chitosan. A crosslinker such as glutaraldehyde can be added to formulate the nanoparticles

=== Emulsification cross-linking ===
Chitosan-based solution is developed in the oil face and translated into stabilized liquid. A crosslinker such as glutaraldehyde can then be used to derive chitosan nanoparticles.

=== Nanoprecipitation ===
Nanoprecipitation refers to using chitosan and dissolving it within a solvent and then having a pump to differentiate the dispersing phase and with tween 80, derive nanoparticles from the dispersing phase.

=== Spray drying ===
Spray drying involves taking chitosan and adding it to the solvent acetic acid solution. The solution will then be atomized. These droplets will be mixed with drying gas and after further evaporation, nanoparticles can be derived.

== Applications ==
=== Biomedical applications ===
Biomedical applications of chitosan-based nanoparticles range from cancer treatment to regenerative medicine and tissue engineering to inflammatory diseases to diabetic treatment to the treatment of cerebral diseases, cardiovascular diseases, infectious diseases, and even for vaccine delivery. Lung cancer, breast cancer, and colorectal cancer include the top 3 cancers in terms of frequency and are responsible for 1 out of 3 cancer cases and death burden worldwide. Chitosan-based nanoparticles provide benefits to make targeted drug delivery systems for biomedical use and overall improve the potential of oral administration of drugs (Figure 3).

Figure 3 Advantages of chitosan nanoparticles. Adopted from Sharifi-Rad et al, 2021.

==== Drug delivery system ====
One of the main uses of chitosan-based nanoparticles involves drug delivery devices. The following are drugs delivered with chitosan-based nanoparticle: methotrexate, fucose-conjugated chitosan, 5-fluorouracil, doxorubicin, docetaxel, paclitaxel, propranolol-HCL, CyA, insulin, indomethacin, cefazolin, isoniazid, tetracycline, didanosine, isoniazid, rifampicin, folate, zaltoprofen, curcumin, cisplatin, camptothecin, bupivacaine, paclitaxel, prothionamide, hydrocortisone, albumin, ocimum gratissimum essential oil, triphosphate, RGD peptides and morphine. The targeting system again ranges from various drug systems, with a primary focus on targeting cancer within specific organs such as lung or colorectal. The potential of poly(acrylic acid) and the addition has shown success in improvements of overall gene expression and protein delivery through the ability to modify pH sensitivity, modify chemosensitivity, and modify targeting.

Another main use of chitosan-based nanoparticles involves the ability to withhold various drugs, organic compounds, and even inorganic analytes 5,8,9,11,12,23–25,28,32. These analytes include Fe_{3}O4 (Figure 4). A Fe_{3}O_{4} based chitosan poly(acrylic acid) nanoparticle or nanosphere can have applications such as toxic metal uptake for direct use in drug delivery systems, treatment of tumors, magnetic separation of biomolecules, and even MRI contrast enhancement.

Figure 4 Magnetic nanospheres with chitosan-poly(acrylic acid). Adopted from Feng et al, 2009.

=== Edible coating ===
Chitosan coatings, both nanoparticle and ordinary, have been shown to prolong the shelf life of food. Chitosan-coated putrescine nanoparticles are even better at this task, being able to slow the decay of fruits for up to 12 days when held at low temperatures.

== Limitations and future work ==
Overall continued improvement of stability, biocompatibility, degradability, and nontoxicity is needed to improve the viability. Current limitations exist in routes of delivery, such as limited work in orally administered nanoparticles and drug delivery devices. Absorption should further be improved in chitosan poly(acrylic acid) nanoparticles for improved solubility for targeted drug delivery. Additionally, further work in cell viability and cell proliferation is needed within these nanoparticles for use in tissue regeneration. Additionally, current limitations exist in fabrication techniques and large chain implementation due to possible difficulties in the synthesis of chitosan-based nanoparticles.
