= Sodium phosphate =

Sodium salts of phosphoric acid

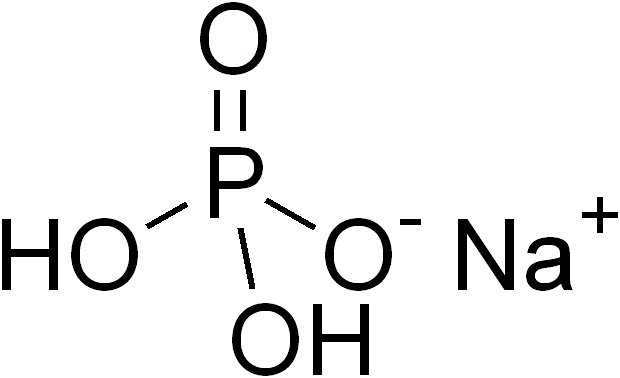
Sodium dihydrogen phosphate

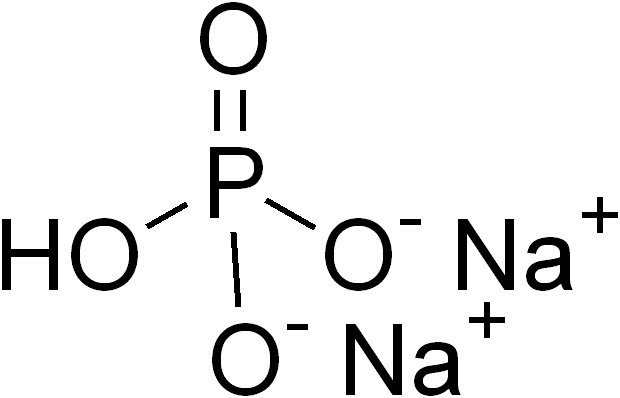
Sodium hydrogen phosphate

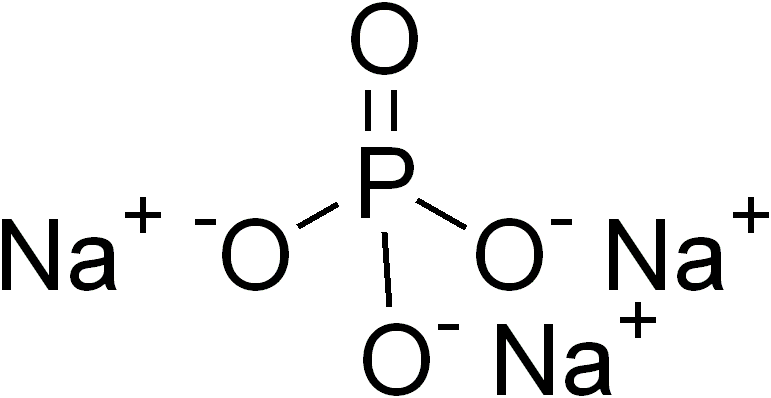
Trisodium phosphate

A sodium phosphate is a generic variety of salts of sodium (Na^{+}) and phosphate (PO^{3−}_{4}). Phosphate also forms families or condensed anions including di-, tri-, tetra-, and polyphosphates. Most of these salts are known in both anhydrous (water-free) and hydrated forms. The hydrates are more common than the anhydrous forms.

== Uses ==
Sodium phosphates have many applications in food and for water treatment. Sodium phosphates are often used as water-retaining agents for frozen food, thickening agents for processed food, and leavening agents for baked goods. It is also a source of the phosphate ion (an emulsifying agent) for processed cheese, where it chelates calcium, thereby allowing the casein in cheese to remain suspended and preventing separation during heating. They are also used to control pH of processed foods.

They are also used in medicine for constipation and to prepare the bowel for medical procedures, by acting as an osmotic laxative that draws water into the bowel.

Like other phosphate salts they are used in detergents to increase their activity in hard water. They are also used in water softeners in addition to regular sodium chloride.

They are also useful corrosion inhibitors for preventing rusting of metal pipes.

== Adverse effects ==
Sodium phosphates are popular in commerce in part because they are inexpensive and because they are nontoxic at normal levels of consumption. However, oral sodium phosphates when taken at high doses for bowel preparation for colonoscopy may in some individuals carry a risk of kidney injury under the form of phosphate nephropathy. There are several oral phosphate formulations which are prepared extemporaneously. Oral phosphate prep drugs have been withdrawn in the United States, although evidence of causality is equivocal. Since safe and effective replacements for phosphate purgatives are available, several medical authorities have recommended general disuse of oral phosphates.

== Monophosphates ==
Three families of sodium monophosphates are common, those derived from orthophosphate (PO^{3−}_{4}), hydrogen phosphate (HPO^{2−}_{4}), and dihydrogenphosphate (H_{2}PO^{−}_{4}). Some of the best known salts are shown in the following table.

name	formula	CAS registry number
monosodium phosphate (anhydrous)	NaH_{2}PO_{4}	7558-80-7
monosodium phosphate monohydrate	NaH_{2}PO_{4}·H_{2}O	10049-21-5
monosodium phosphate dihydrate	NaH_{2}PO_{4}·2H_{2}O	13472-35-0
disodium phosphate (anhydrous)	Na_{2}HPO_{4}	7558–79–4
disodium phosphate dihydrate	Na_{2}HPO_{4}·2H_{2}O	10028-24-7
disodium phosphate heptahydrate	Na_{2}HPO_{4}·7H_{2}O	7782–85–6
disodium phosphate octahydrate	Na_{2}HPO_{4}·8H_{2}O	
disodium phosphate dodecahydrate	Na_{2}HPO_{4}·12H_{2}O	10039–32–4
trisodium phosphate (anhydrous, hexagonal)	Na_{3}PO_{4}	
trisodium phosphate (anhydrous, cubic)	Na_{3}PO_{4}	7601–54–9
trisodium phosphate hemihydrate	Na_{3}PO_{4}·0.5H_{2}O	
trisodium phosphate hexahydrate	Na_{3}PO_{4}·6H_{2}O	
trisodium phosphate octahydrate	Na_{3}PO_{4}·8H_{2}O	
trisodium phosphate dodecahydrate	Na_{3}PO_{4}·12H_{2}O	10101-89-0

== Di- and polyphosphates ==
In addition to these phosphates, sodium forms a number of useful salts with pyrophosphates (also called diphosphates), triphosphates and high polymers. Of these salts, those of the diphosphates are particularly common commercially.

name	formula	CAS Registry number
monosodium diphosphate (anhydrous)	NaH_{3}P_{2}O_{7}	
disodium diphosphate (anhydrous)	Na_{2}H_{2}P_{2}O_{7}	7758-16-9
disodium diphosphate hexahydrate	Na_{2}H_{2}P_{2}O_{7}·6H_{2}O	
trisodium diphosphate (anhydrous)	Na_{3}HP_{2}O_{7}	
trisodium diphosphate monohydrate	Na_{3}HP_{2}O_{7}·H_{2}O	
trisodium diphosphate nonahydrate	Na_{3}HP_{2}O_{7}·9H_{2}O	
tetrasodium diphosphate (anhydrous)	Na_{4}P_{2}O_{7}	7722-88-5
tetrasodium diphosphate decahydrate	Na_{4}P_{2}O_{7}·10H_{2}O	13472-36-1

Beyond the diphosphates, sodium salts are known triphosphates, e.g. sodium triphosphate and tetraphosphates. The cyclic polyphosphates, called metaphosphates, include the trimer sodium trimetaphosphate and the tetramer, Na_{3}P_{3}O_{9} and Na_{4}P_{4}O_{12}, respectively.

Polymeric sodium phosphates are formed upon heating mixtures of NaH_{2}PO_{4} and Na_{2}HPO_{4}, which induces a condensation reaction. The specific polyphosphate generated depends on the details of the heating and annealing. One derivative is the glassy (i.e., amorphous) Graham's salt (sodium hexametaphosphate). It is a cyclic polyphosphate with the formula Na_{6}[(PO_{3})_{6}]. Crystalline high molecular weight polyphosphates include Kurrol's salt and Maddrell's salt (CAS#10361-03-2). These species have the formula [NaPO_{3}]_{n}[NaPO_{3}(OH)]_{2} where n can be as great as 2000, and it is a white powder practically insoluble in water. In terms of their structures, these polymers consist of PO^{−}_{3} units, with the chains are terminated by protonated phosphates.
