= Potassium metaphosphate =

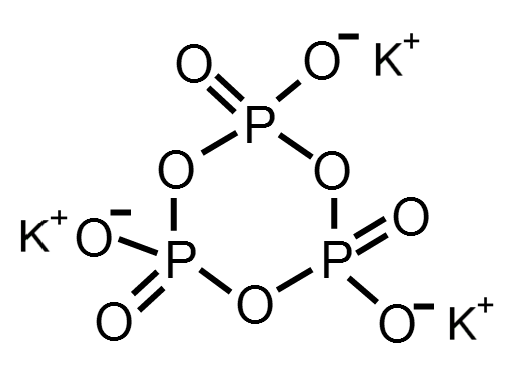
- Diagram of the cyclic trimetaphosphate

Identifiers
CAS Number	7790-53-6
3D model (JSmol)	Interactive image
ChEBI	CHEBI:148438
ChEMBL	ChEMBL2106746
ChemSpider	10609094
ECHA InfoCard	100.029.284
EC Number	232-212-6
KEGG	D05582
PubChem CID	16133895
UNII	01DMT14Z63
CompTox Dashboard (EPA)	DTXSID90872576
- InChI: InChI=1S/K.HO3P/c;1-4(2)3/h;(H,1,2,3)/q+1;/p-1 Key: OQZCJRJRGMMSGK-UHFFFAOYSA-M
- SMILES: [O-]P(=O)=O.[K+]

Properties
Chemical formula	KPO_{3}
Molar mass	118.069 g·mol^{−1}
Appearance	white
Odor	odorless
Density	2.45 g/cm^{3}
Melting point	807 °C (1,485 °F; 1,080 K)
Solubility in water	practically insoluble
Solubility	soluble in dilute sodium salt solutions readily soluble in ammonium citrate solution

Structure
Crystal structure	monoclinic (trimetaphosphate)
Space group	P 1 2_{1}/n 1 (No. 14)
Lattice constant	a = 11.074 Å, b = 11.965 Å, c = 7.35 Å α = 90°, β = 102.18°, γ = 90°
Lattice volume (V)	952 Å^{3}
Formula units (Z)	4 units per cell

Related compounds
Related compounds	Sodium trimetaphosphate; Sodium hexametaphosphate
- Except where otherwise noted, data are given for materials in their standard state (at 25 °C [77 °F], 100 kPa). Infobox references

Potassium metaphosphate is an inorganic compound with the empirical formula KPO_{3}. It is a white, odorless, practically insoluble solid. A cyclic trimetaphosphate has been characterized. The polymeric form (KPO_{3})_{n} is known as potassium Kurrol's salt or potassium polyphosphate.

== Properties ==
Although the compound is practically insoluble in water, it forms a viscous solution in the presence of other alkali metal cations such as Na^{+} as well as ammonium. This is attributed to ion exchange where the compact structure of the crystal is disturbed, permitting dissolution. Additionally, if sodium metaphosphate and potassium metaphosphate (both individually insoluble) are mixed, the mixture dissolves due to mutual ion exchange. The compound can also be solublized by passing an aquous suspension through a colloid mill.

== Structure ==
The trimetaphosphate forms monoclinic crystals (space group P 1 2_{1}/n 1). It is isotypic with ammonium trimetaphosphate.

Four modifications of the polymeric form have been characterized. All are polyphosphates composed of long chain anions of corner-sharing PO_{4} tetrahedra. All three transformations are reversible, fast, and show no hysteresis.

Modifications of potassium polyphosphate, (KPO_{3})n
Modification	Stability range	Crystal system	Space group	a (Å)	b (Å)	c (Å)	β (°)	V (Å^{3})	Z (KPO_{3})	D_{x} (g·cm^{−3})	Measured at	Ref.
T (Tief, low)	below 275 °C	monoclinic	P2_{1}/a	14.02(3)	4.54(1)	10.28(2)	101.5(2)	641(2)	8	2.45(1)	20 °C	
Z (Zwischen, intermediate)	275–460 °C	monoclinic	P2_{1}/a	14.02(3)	4.54(1)	11.56(2)	64.7(1)	665(2)	8	2.36(1)	400 °C	
H (Hoch, high)	460–650 °C	orthorhombic	Pbnm	12.80(3)	4.54(1)	5.89(1)	90	342(1)	4	2.29(1)	510 °C	
HT (Höchst, highest)	above 650 °C	orthorhombic	Bbmm	12.94(3)	4.54(2)	5.92(2)	90	349(3)	4	2.22(2)	660 °C	

== Preparation ==
Potassium metaphosphate can be prepared by reacting phosphorus pentoxide with potassium chloride at high temperature.

Potassium dihydrogen phosphate dehydrates rapidly at 205–230 °C (401–446 °F; 478–503 K) forming the polyphosphate. Temperatures above 150 °C (302 °F; 423 K) are also known to result in varying chain lengths. The product appears to have a fibrous structure much like asbestos.

The compound may also be prepared by direct action of potassium chloride on phosphoric acid:

KCl + 2H_{3}PO_{4} ⇌ KH_{5}(PO_{4})_{2} + HCl
KH_{5}(PO_{4})_{2} ⇌ KH_{2}PO_{4} + H_{3}PO_{4}
KH_{2}PO_{4} ⇌ (KPO_{3})_{n} + H_{2}O

The degree of polymerization increases with temperature and time of heating. Upon heating at 260 °C (500 °F; 533 K) for 215-280 hr the degree of polymerization is 2300; at 445 °C (833 °F; 718 K) for 115-240 hr, it is 11,700. The common product has a molecular weight range of 250,000 to several million.

== Uses ==
Potassium metaphosphate finds use as a buffer in pharmaceuticals. In foods, it used as a binder, fat emulsifier, moisture-retaining agent, alkaline agent, and raising agent. It is also used in micro-encapsulation systems.

The compound was considered an experimental agricultural fertiliser. It is of relatively minor importance in this application. It is a slow-release source of phosphorus as it hydrolyzes to give more water-soluble orthophosphates; the rate is affected by moisture content, temperature, and acidity of the mix.

== See also ==
- Metaphosphate
- Polyphosphate
