= Erbium phosphate =

Names
- Other names Erbium orthophosphate

Identifiers
CAS Number	14298-38-5
3D model (JSmol)	Interactive image
ChemSpider	11258818
EC Number	238-234-2
PubChem CID	13932376
CompTox Dashboard (EPA)	DTXSID10162269
- InChI: InChI=1S/Er.H3O4P/c;1-5(2,3)4/h;(H3,1,2,3,4)/q+3;/p-3 Key: XFULIUKARWFBDF-UHFFFAOYSA-K
- SMILES: [O-]P(=O)([O-])[O-].[Er+3]

Properties
Chemical formula	ErPO_{4}
Molar mass	262.23 g/mol
Appearance	Solid
Melting point	1,896 °C (3,445 °F; 2,169 K) (approximately)
Solubility in water	Very slightly soluble in water

Structure
Crystal structure	Tetragonal, xenotime type
Space group	I4_{1}/amd, No. 141
Lattice constant	a = 0.68614 nm, c = 0.60082 nm
Formula units (Z)	4
- Except where otherwise noted, data are given for materials in their standard state (at 25 °C [77 °F], 100 kPa). Infobox references

Erbium phosphate is an inorganic compound of erbium and phosphate with the chemical formula ErPO_{4}. Hydrated forms are also known.

== Structure and properties ==
Anhydrous erbium phosphate crystallizes in the tetragonal crystal system with the xenotime structure, which is isostructural with zircon. It belongs to space group I4_{1}/amd (No. 141), with four formula units per unit cell. Reported lattice parameters are a = 6.8614(5) Å and c = 6.0082(9) Å.

The structure consists of isolated PO_{4} tetrahedra and eight-coordinate Er^{3+} ions. Like other heavy rare-earth orthophosphates, ErPO_{4} is chemically resistant and only very slightly soluble in water.

Erbium phosphate has a high melting point, reported at approximately 1896 °C. Thermodynamic measurements have been made over a wide temperature range; its heat capacity shows a Schottky anomaly associated with crystal field splitting of the Er^{3+} electronic levels.

=== High-pressure behaviour ===
At ambient pressure ErPO_{4} adopts the xenotime structure. Under compression, it undergoes a reversible structural transformation to a denser monoclinic monazite-type phase, with the transition beginning at about 17.3 GPa.

The monazite phase is less compressible than the xenotime phase because of its more efficient atomic packing.

== Preparation ==
Hydrated erbium phosphate can be prepared by precipitation from aqueous solutions containing Er^{3+} and phosphate ions. A dihydrate has been obtained by reacting erbium(III) chloride with phosphoric acid.

Heating hydrated erbium phosphate produces anhydrous ErPO_{4}.

Anhydrous material can also be prepared by high-temperature solid-state or hydrothermal methods.

== Reactions ==
Erbium phosphate reacts with sodium fluoride under suitable conditions to form the fluorophosphates NaErFPO_{4} and Na_{3}Er_{2}F_{3}PO_{4}.

It also reacts with potassium metaphosphate, KPO_{3}, to form potassium erbium diphosphate, KErP_{2}O_{7}.
