= Triphosphate—protein phosphotransferase =

diphosphate-protein phosphotransferase

Identifiers
- EC no.: 2.7.99.1
- CAS no.: 74092-32-3

Databases
- IntEnz: IntEnz view
- BRENDA: BRENDA entry
- ExPASy: NiceZyme view
- KEGG: KEGG entry
- MetaCyc: metabolic pathway
- PRIAM: profile
- PDB structures: RCSB PDB PDBe PDBsum
- Gene Ontology: AmiGO / QuickGO
Search
- PMC: articles
- PubMed: articles
- NCBI: proteins

In enzymology, a triphosphate-protein phosphotransferase (EC 2.7.99.1) is an enzyme that catalyzes the chemical reaction

triphosphate + [microsomal-membrane protein] $\rightleftharpoons$ diphosphate + phospho-[microsomal-membrane protein]

Thus, the two substrates of this enzyme are triphosphate and microsomal-membrane protein, whereas its two products are diphosphate and [[phospho-[microsomal-membrane protein]]].

== Classification ==
This enzyme belongs to the family of transferases, specifically those transferring phosphorus-containing groups that are not covered by other phosphotransferase families.

== Nomenclature ==
The systematic name of this enzyme class is triphosphate:[microsomal-membrane-protein] phosphotransferase. Other names in common use include diphosphate:microsomal-membrane-protein O-phosphotransferase, (erroneous), DiPPT (erroneous), pyrophosphate:protein phosphotransferase (erroneous), diphosphate-protein phosphotransferase (erroneous), diphosphate:[microsomal-membrane-protein] O-phosphotransferase, and (erroneous).
