= Polyphosphate—glucose phosphotransferase =

polyphosphate-glucose phosphotransferase

Identifiers
- EC no.: 2.7.1.63
- CAS no.: 9033-50-5

Databases
- IntEnz: IntEnz view
- BRENDA: BRENDA entry
- ExPASy: NiceZyme view
- KEGG: KEGG entry
- MetaCyc: metabolic pathway
- PRIAM: profile
- PDB structures: RCSB PDB PDBe PDBsum
- Gene Ontology: AmiGO / QuickGO
Search
- PMC: articles
- PubMed: articles
- NCBI: proteins

In enzymology, a polyphosphate-glucose phosphotransferase (EC 2.7.1.63) is an enzyme that catalyzes the chemical reaction.

(phosphate)n + D-glucose $\rightleftharpoons$ (phosphate)n-1 + D-glucose 6-phosphate

Thus, the two substrates of this enzyme are (phosphate)n and D-glucose, whereas its two products are (phosphate)n-1 and D-glucose 6-phosphate.

This enzyme belongs to the family of transferases, specifically those transferring phosphorus-containing groups (phosphotransferases) with an alcohol group as acceptor. The systematic name of this enzyme class is polyphosphate:D-glucose 6-phosphotransferase. Other names in common use include polyphosphate glucokinase, polyphosphate-D-(+)-glucose-6-phosphotransferase, and polyphosphate-glucose 6-phosphotransferase. This enzyme participates in glycolysis / gluconeogenesis. It employs one cofactor, neutral salt.
