= Tetrasodium pyrophosphate =

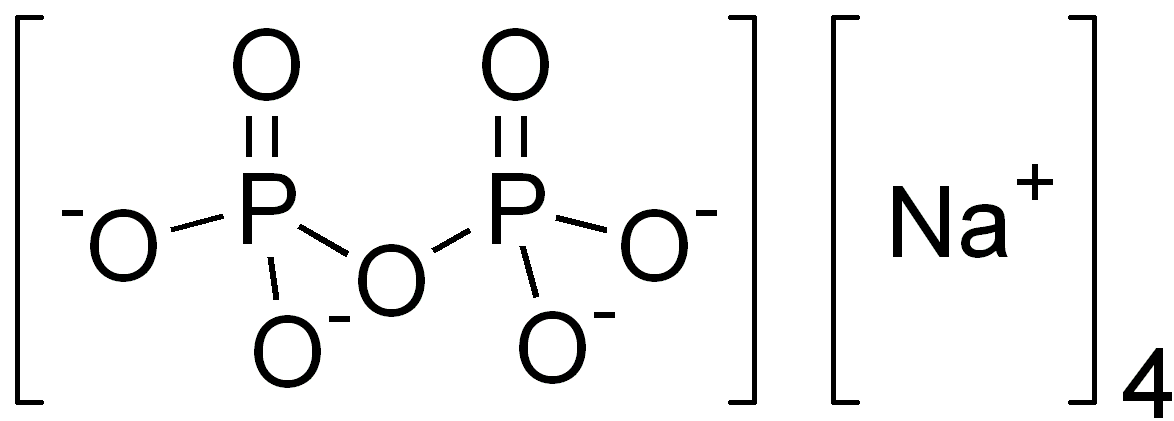

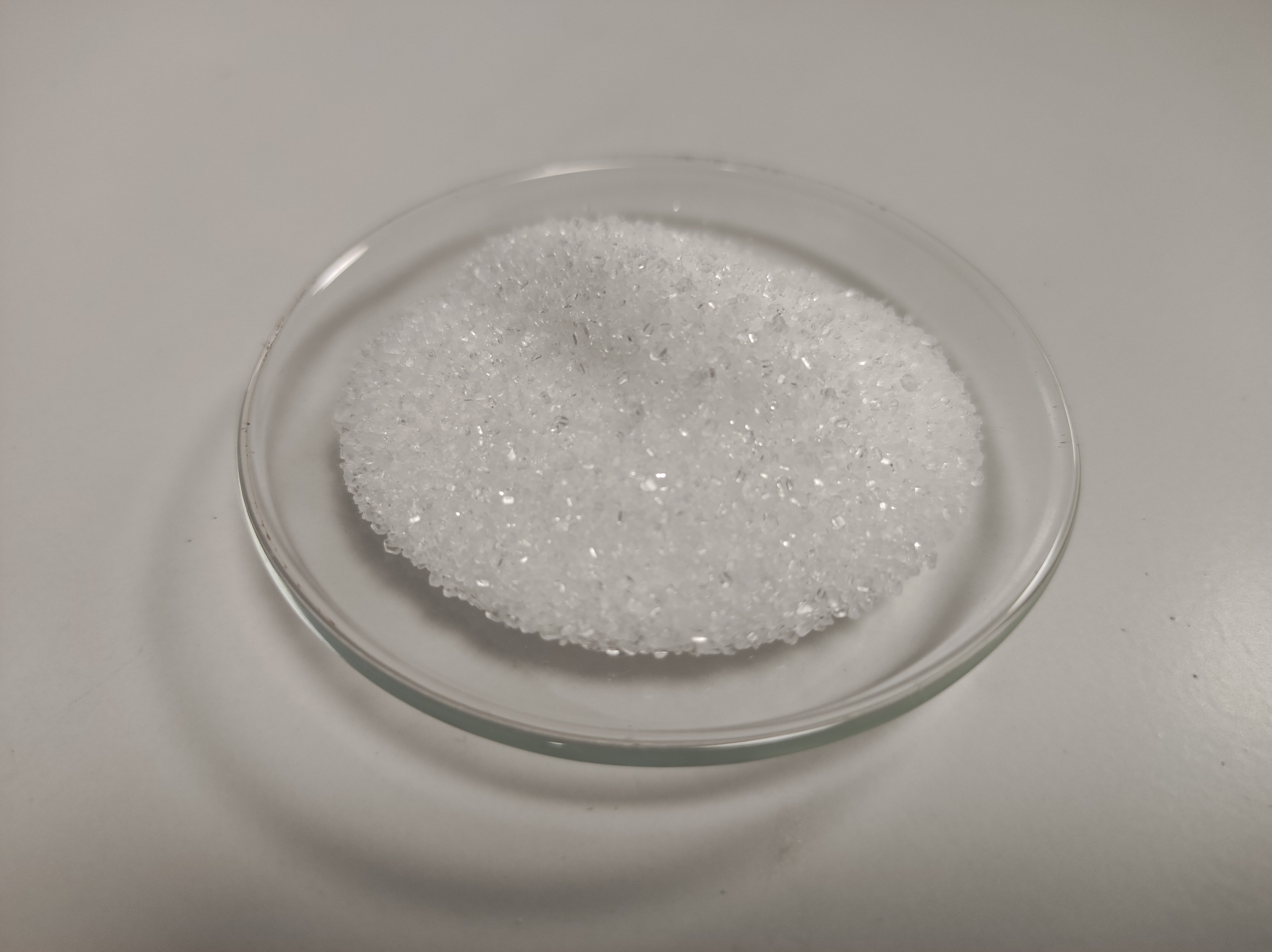

Names
- IUPAC name Tetrasodium diphosphate
- Other names: Sodium pyrophosphate; Tetrasodium pyrophosphate; TSPP

Identifiers
CAS Number	7722-88-5; (decahydrate): 13472-36-1
3D model (JSmol)	Interactive image; (decahydrate): Interactive image
ChEBI	CHEBI:71240; (decahydrate): CHEBI:177382
ChemSpider	22813; (decahydrate): 2341259
ECHA InfoCard	100.028.880
EC Number	231-767-1; (decahydrate): 603-854-8
E number	E450(iii) (thickeners, ...)
PubChem CID	24403; (decahydrate): 3084150
RTECS number	UX7350000
UNII	O352864B8Z; (decahydrate): IY3DKB96QW
CompTox Dashboard (EPA)	DTXSID9042465; (decahydrate): DTXSID50158904
- InChI: InChI=1S/4Na.H4O7P2/c;;;;1-8(2,3)7-9(4,5)6/h;;;;(H2,1,2,3)(H2,4,5, 6)/q4*+1;/p-4; (decahydrate): InChI=1S/4Na.H4O7P2.10H2O/c;;;;1-8(2,3)7-9(4,5)6;;;;;;;;;;/h;;;;(H2,1,2,3)(H2,4,5,6);10*1H2/q4*+1;;;;;;;;;;;/p-4 Key: VZWGHDYJGOMEKT-UHFFFAOYSA-J
- SMILES: [O-]P(=O)([O-])OP(=O)([O-])[O-].[Na+].[Na+].[Na+].[Na+]; (decahydrate): O.O.O.O.O.O.O.O.O.O.O=P([O-])([O-])OP(=O)([O-])[O-].[Na+].[Na+].[Na+].[Na+]

Properties
Chemical formula	Na_{4}O_{7}P_{2}
Molar mass	265.900 g·mol^{−1}
Appearance	Colorless or white crystals
Odor	odorless
Density	2.534 g/cm^{3}
Melting point	988 °C (1,810 °F; 1,261 K) (anhydrous); 79.5 °C (decahydrate)
Boiling point	decomposes
Solubility in water	2.61 g/100 mL (0 °C); 6.7 g/100 mL (25 °C); 42.2 g/100 mL (100 °C)
Solubility	insoluble in ammonia, alcohol
Refractive index (n_{D})	1.425

Structure
Crystal structure	monoclinic (decahydrate)

Thermochemistry
Heat capacity (C)	241 J/mol K
Std molar entropy (S^{⦵}_{298})	270 J/mol K
Std enthalpy of formation (Δ_{f}H^{⦵}_{298})	−3166 kJ/mol
Gibbs free energy (Δ_{f}G^{⦵})	−3001 kJ/mol

Hazards
- GHS labelling
Pictograms	(GHS05: Corrosive) (GHS07: Exclamation mark)
Signal word	Danger
Hazard statements	H302, H315, H318, H319, H335
Precautionary statements	P261, P264, P264+P265, P270, P271, P280, P301+P317, P302+P352, P304+P340, P305+P351+P338, P305+P354+P338, P317, P319, P321, P330, P332+P317, P337+P317, P362+P364, P403+P233, P405, P501
Flash point	Non-flammable
- NIOSH (US health exposure limits)
PEL (Permissible)	none
REL (Recommended)	TWA 5 mg/m^{3}
IDLH (Immediate danger)	N.D.

Related compounds
Other anions	Trisodium phosphate Pentasodium triphosphate Sodium hexametaphosphate
Other cations	Tetrapotassium pyrophosphate
Related compounds	Disodium pyrophosphate
- Except where otherwise noted, data are given for materials in their standard state (at 25 °C [77 °F], 100 kPa). verify (what is ?) Infobox references

Tetrasodium pyrophosphate, also called sodium pyrophosphate, tetrasodium phosphate or TSPP, is an inorganic compound with the formula Na_{4}P_{2}O_{7}. As a salt, it is a white, water-soluble solid. It is composed of pyrophosphate anion and sodium ions. Its toxicity is approximately twice that of table salt when ingested orally. Also known is the decahydrate Na_{4}P_{2}O_{7}·10H_{2}O.

== Use ==
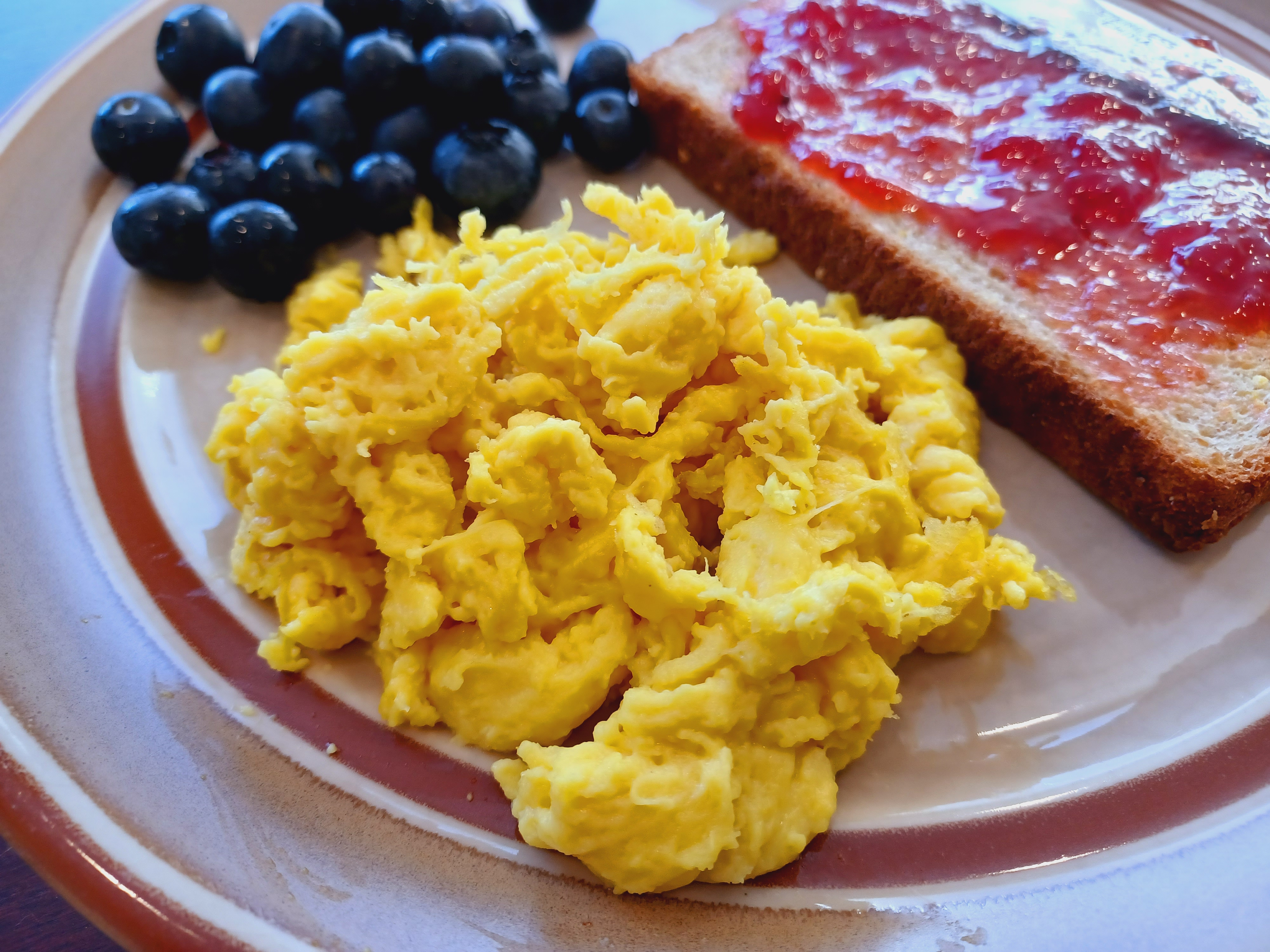
Just Egg, a plant-based egg alternative that contains tetrasodium pyrophosphate

Tetrasodium pyrophosphate is used as a buffering agent, an emulsifier, a dispersing agent, and a thickening agent, and is often used as a food additive. Common foods containing tetrasodium pyrophosphate include chicken nuggets, marshmallows, pudding, crab meat, imitation crab, canned tuna, and soy-based meat alternatives and cat foods and cat treats where it is used as a palatability enhancer.

In toothpaste and dental floss, tetrasodium pyrophosphate acts as a tartar control agent, serving to remove calcium and magnesium from saliva and thus preventing them from being deposited on teeth. Tetrasodium pyrophosphate is used in commercial dental rinses before brushing to aid in plaque reduction.

Tetrasodium pyrophosphate is sometimes used in household detergents to prevent similar deposition on clothing, but due to its phosphate content it causes eutrophication of water, promoting algae growth.

== Production ==
Tetrasodium pyrophosphate is produced by the reaction of furnace-grade phosphoric acid with sodium carbonate to form disodium phosphate, which is then heated to 450 °C to form tetrasodium pyrophosphate:

2 Na_{2}HPO_{4} → Na_{4}P_{2}O_{7} + H_{2}O
