= Sodium triphosphate =

Names
- IUPAC name Pentasodium triphosphate
- Other names sodium tripolyphosphate, polygon, STPP

Identifiers
CAS Number	anhydrous: 7758-29-4; hexahydrate: 15091-98-2
3D model (JSmol)	anhydrous: Interactive image; hexahydrate: Interactive image
ChEMBL	hexahydrate: ChEMBL3183517
ChemSpider	anhydrous: 22863; hexahydrate: 16089899
ECHA InfoCard	100.028.944
EC Number	anhydrous: 231-838-7; hexahydrate: 604-757-3
E number	E451 (thickeners, ...)
PubChem CID	anhydrous: 517047; hexahydrate: 23064738
RTECS number	anhydrous: YK4570000
UNII	anhydrous: 9SW4PFD2FZ; hexahydrate: T7Y93S4UXX
CompTox Dashboard (EPA)	anhydrous: DTXSID9036307
- InChI: InChI=1S/5Na.H5O10P3/c;;;;;1-11(2,3)9-13(7,8)10-12(4,5)6/h;;;;;(H,7,8)(H2,1,2,3)(H2,4,5,6)/q5*+1;/p-5 Key: HWGNBUXHKFFFIH-UHFFFAOYSA-I; hexahydrate: InChI=1S/5Na.H5O10P3.6H2O/c;;;;;1-11(2,3)9-13(7,8)10-12(4,5)6;;;;;;/h;;;;;(H,7,8)(H2,1,2,3)(H2,4,5,6);6*1H2/q5*+1;;;;;;;/p-5 Key: FGXJOKTYAQIFRP-UHFFFAOYSA-I
- SMILES: anhydrous: [O-]P(=O)([O-])OP(=O)([O-])OP(=O)([O-])[O-].[Na+].[Na+].[Na+].[Na+].[Na+]; hexahydrate: O.O.O.O.O.O.O=P([O-])([O-])OP(=O)([O-])OP(=O)([O-])[O-].[Na+].[Na+].[Na+].[Na+].[Na+]

Properties
Chemical formula	Na_{5}P_{3}O_{10}
Molar mass	367.864 g/mol
Appearance	white powder
Density	2.52 g/cm^{3}
Melting point	622 °C (1,152 °F; 895 K)
Solubility in water	14.5 g/100 mL (25 °C)

Hazards
NFPA 704 (fire diamond)	2 0 0
Flash point	Non-flammable
Safety data sheet (SDS)	ICSC 1469

Related compounds
Other anions	Trisodium phosphate Tetrasodium pyrophosphate Sodium hexametaphosphate
Other cations	Pentapotassium triphosphate
- Except where otherwise noted, data are given for materials in their standard state (at 25 °C [77 °F], 100 kPa). verify (what is ?) Infobox references

Sodium triphosphate (STP), also sodium tripolyphosphate (STPP), or tripolyphosphate (TPP),) is an inorganic compound with formula Na_{5}P_{3}O_{10}. It is the sodium salt of the polyphosphate penta-anion, which is the conjugate base of triphosphoric acid. It is produced on a large scale as a component of many domestic and industrial products, especially detergents. Environmental problems associated with eutrophication are attributed to its widespread use.

== Preparation and properties ==
Sodium tripolyphosphate is produced by heating a stoichiometric mixture of disodium phosphate, Na_{2}HPO_{4}, and monosodium phosphate, NaH_{2}PO_{4}, under carefully controlled conditions.

2 Na_{2}HPO_{4} + NaH_{2}PO_{4} → Na_{5}P_{3}O_{10} + 2 H_{2}O

In this way, approximately 2 million tons are produced annually.

STPP is a colourless salt, which exists both in anhydrous form and as the hexahydrate. The anion can be described as the pentanionic chain [O_{3}POP(O)_{2}OPO_{3}]^{5−}. Many related di-, tri-, and polyphosphates are known including the cyclic triphosphate (e.g. sodium trimetaphosphate). It binds strongly to metal cations as both a bidentate and tridentate chelating agent.

Chelation of a metal cation by triphosphate.

== Uses ==
=== Detergents ===
The majority of STPP is consumed as a component of commercial detergents. It serves as a "builder", industrial jargon for a water softener. In hard water (water that contains high concentrations of Mg^{2+} and Ca^{2+}), detergents are deactivated. Being a highly charged chelating agent, TPP^{5−} binds to dications tightly and prevents them from interfering with the sulfonate detergent.

=== Food ===
STPP is a preservative for seafood, meats, poultry, and animal feeds. It is common in food production as E number E451. In foods, STPP is used as an emulsifier and to retain moisture. Many governments regulate the quantities allowed in foods, as it can substantially increase the sale weight of seafood in particular. The United States Food and Drug Administration lists STPP as Generally recognized as safe.

=== Other ===
Other uses (hundreds of thousands of tons/year) include ceramics (decrease the viscosity of glazes up to a certain limit), leather tanning (as masking agent and synthetic tanning agent - SYNTAN), anticaking agents, setting retarders, flame retardants, paper, anticorrosion pigments, textiles, rubber manufacture, fermentation, antifreeze." TPP is used as a polyanion crosslinker in polysaccharide based drug delivery. Toothpaste may contain sodium triphosphate.

== Health effects ==
High serum phosphate concentration has been identified as a predictor of cardiovascular events and mortality. Whilst phosphate is present in the body and food in organic forms, inorganic forms of phosphate such as sodium triphosphate are readily adsorbed and can result in elevated phosphate levels in serum. Salts of polyphosphate anions are moderately irritating to skin and mucous membranes because they are mildly alkaline.

== Environmental effects ==
Because it is very water-soluble, STPP is not significantly removed by waste water treatment. STPP hydrolyses to phosphate, which is assimilated into the natural phosphorus cycle. Detergents containing phosphorus contribute to the eutrophication of many fresh waters.

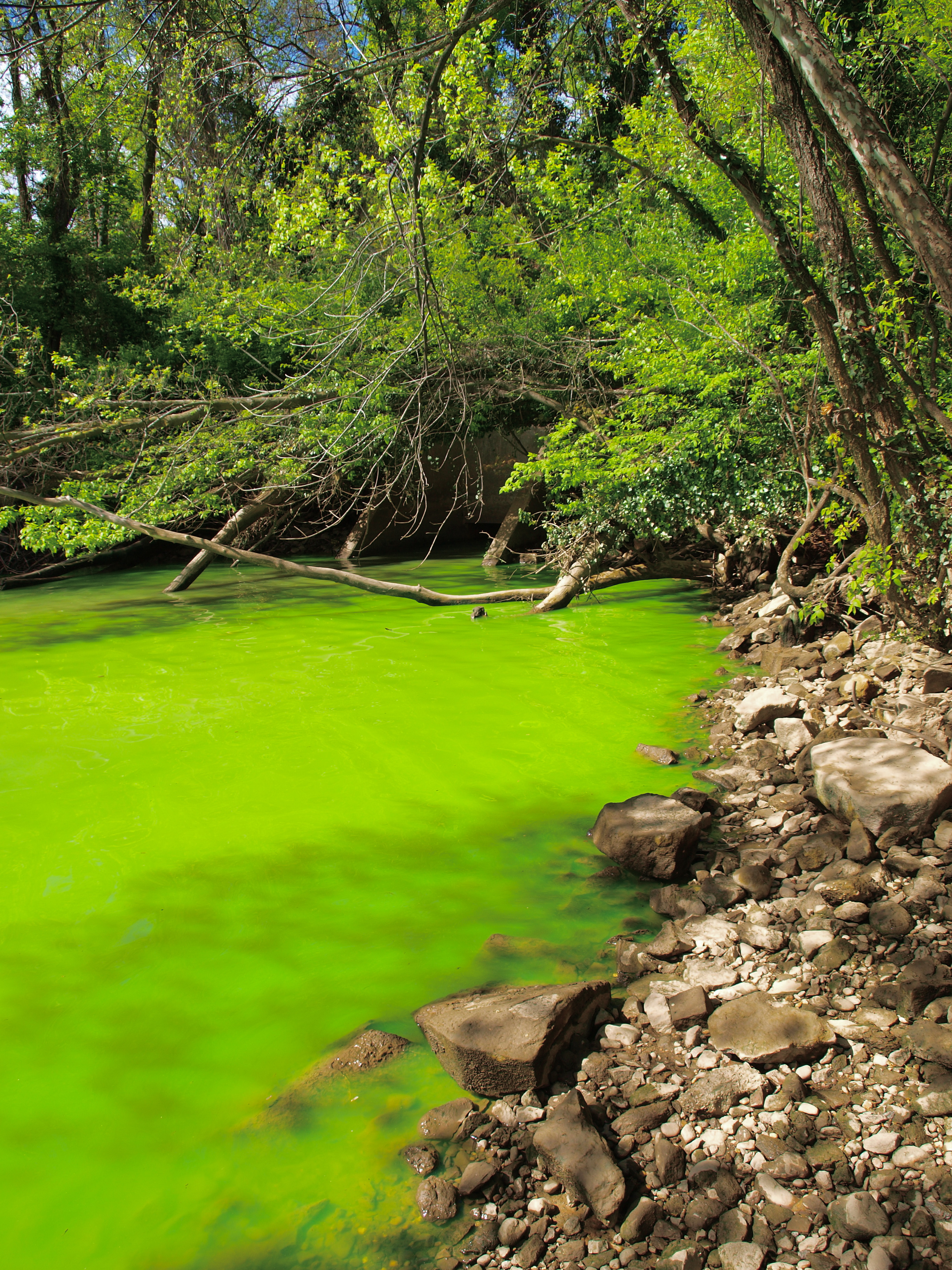
The eutrophication of the Potomac River, caused from phosphate run-off, is evident from the bright green bloom of algae.

== See also ==
- Sodium trimetaphosphate, a cyclic triphosphate
- Acceptable daily intake
