= Disodium pyrophosphate =

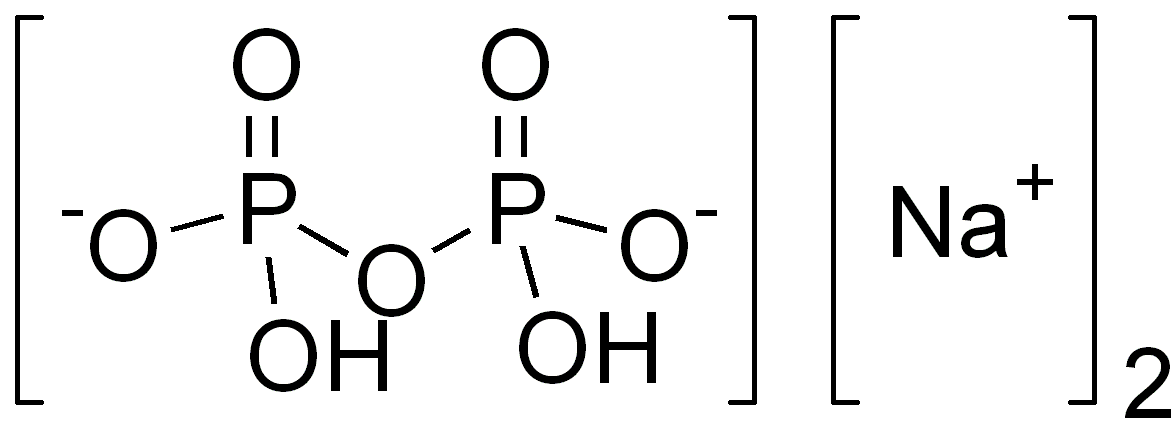
- Disodium pyrophosphate

Names
- IUPAC name Disodium dihydrogen diphosphate
- Other names: Diphosphoric acid, disodium salt; Disodium dihydrogen pyrophosphate; Disodium diphosphate; Sodium acid pyrophosphate

Identifiers
CAS Number	7758-16-9
3D model (JSmol)	Interactive image
ChEMBL	ChEMBL3184949
ChemSpider	22859
ECHA InfoCard	100.028.941
EC Number	231-835-0
E number	E450(i) (thickeners, ...)
PubChem CID	24451
UNII	H5WVD9LZUD
CompTox Dashboard (EPA)	DTXSID7044261
- InChI: InChI=1S/2Na.H4O7P2/c;;1-8(2,3)7-9(4,5)6/h;;(H2,1,2,3)(H2,4,5,6)/q2*+1;/p-2 Key: GYQBBRRVRKFJRG-UHFFFAOYSA-L; InChI=1/2Na.H4O7P2/c;;1-8(2,3)7-9(4,5)6/h;;(H2,1,2,3)(H2,4,5,6)/q2*+1;/p-2 Key: GYQBBRRVRKFJRG-NUQVWONBAI
- SMILES: [Na+].[Na+].[O-]P(=O)(O)OP([O-])(=O)O

Properties
Chemical formula	Na_{2}H_{2}P_{2}O_{7}
Molar mass	221.936 g·mol^{−1}
Appearance	White odorless powder
Density	2.31 g/cm^{3}
Melting point	> 600 °C (1,112 °F; 873 K)
Solubility in water	11.9 g/100mL (20 °C (68 °F))
Refractive index (n_{D})	1.4645 (hexahydrate)

Hazards
- Lethal dose or concentration (LD, LC)
LD_{50} (median dose)	2650 mg/kg (mouse, oral)

Related compounds
Other anions	Disodium phosphate; Pentasodium triphosphate; Sodium hexametaphosphate
Other cations	Calcium pyrophosphate; Dipotassium pyrophosphate
Related compounds	Tetrasodium pyrophosphate
- Except where otherwise noted, data are given for materials in their standard state (at 25 °C [77 °F], 100 kPa). verify (what is ?) Infobox references

Disodium pyrophosphate or sodium acid pyrophosphate (SAPP) is an inorganic compound with the chemical formula Na_{2}H_{2}P_{2}O_{7}. It consists of sodium cations (Na^{+}) and dihydrogen pyrophosphate anions (H_{2}P_{2}O_{7}^{2−}). It is a white, water-soluble solid that serves as a buffering and chelating agent, with many applications in the food industry. When crystallized from water, it forms a hexahydrate, but it dehydrates above room temperature. Pyrophosphate is a polyvalent anion with a high affinity for polyvalent cations, e.g. Ca^{2+}.

== Production ==
Disodium pyrophosphate is produced by heating sodium dihydrogen phosphate:

2 NaH_{2}PO_{4} → Na_{2}H_{2}P_{2}O_{7} + H_{2}O

== Food uses ==
Disodium pyrophosphate is a popular leavening agent found in baking powders. It combines with sodium bicarbonate to release carbon dioxide:

Na_{2}H_{2}P_{2}O_{7} + NaHCO_{3} → Na_{3}HP_{2}O_{7} + CO_{2} + H_{2}O

It is available in a variety of grades that affect the speed of its action. Because the resulting phosphate residue has an off-taste, SAPP is usually used in very sweet cakes which mask the off-taste.

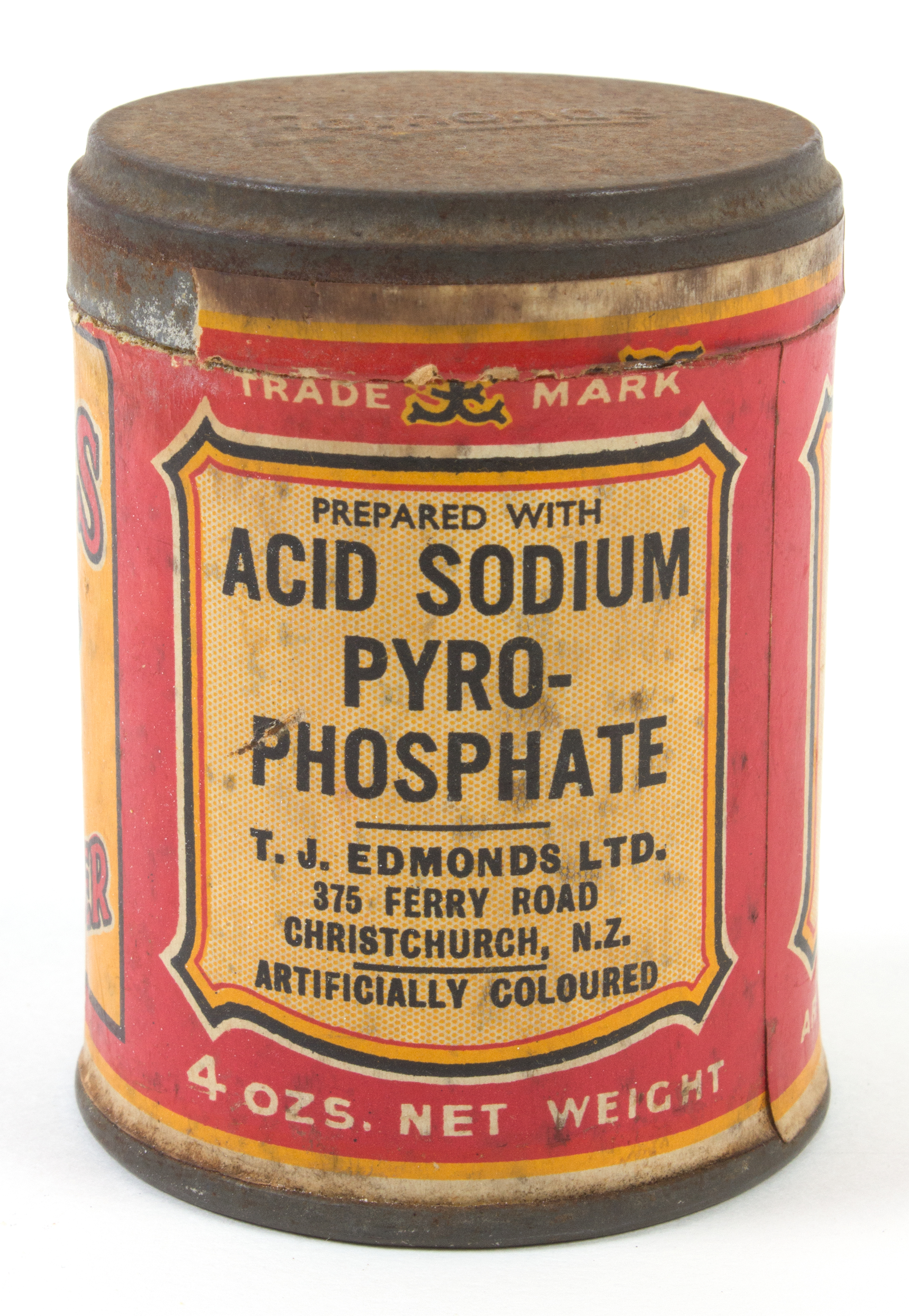
Disodium pyrophosphate in baking powder, New Zealand, 1950s

Disodium pyrophosphate and other sodium and potassium polyphosphates are widely used in food processing; in the E number scheme, they are collectively designated as E450, with the disodium form designated as E450(a). In the United States, it is classified as generally recognized as safe (GRAS) for food use. In canned seafood, it is used to maintain color and reduce purge during retorting. Retorting achieves microbial stability with heat. It is an acid source for reaction with baking soda to leaven baked goods. In baking powder, it is often labeled as food additive E450. In cured meats, it speeds the conversion of sodium nitrite to nitrite (NO_{2}^{−}) by forming the nitrous acid (HNO_{2}) intermediate, and can improve water-holding capacity. Disodium pyrophosphate is also found in frozen hash browns and other potato products, where it is used to keep the color of the potatoes from darkening via enzymatic browning.

Disodium pyrophosphate can leave a slightly bitter aftertaste in some products, but "the SAPP taste can be masked by using sufficient baking soda and by adding a source of calcium ions, sugar, or flavorings."

== Other uses ==
In leather treatment, it can be used to remove iron stains on hides during processing. It can stabilize hydrogen peroxide solutions against reduction. It can be used with sulfamic acid in some dairy applications for cleaning, especially to remove soapstone. When added to scalding water, it facilitates removal of hair and scurf in hog slaughter and feathers and scurf in poultry slaughter. In petroleum production, it can be used as a dispersant in oil well drilling muds. It is used in cat foods as a palatability additive. Disodium pyrophosphate is used as a tartar control agent in toothpastes.
