= Phosphoric acid =

Chemical compound (PO(OH)3)

- Structural formula of phosphoric acid, showing dimensions

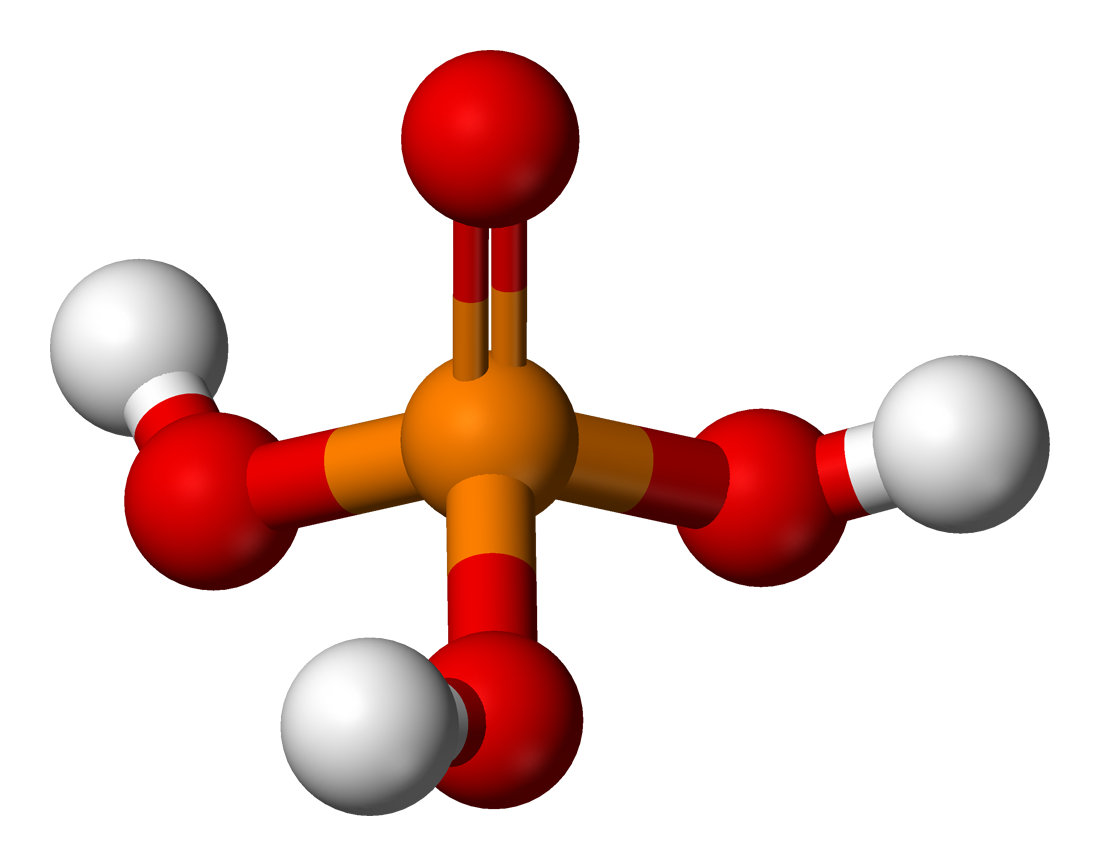
Ball-and-stick model
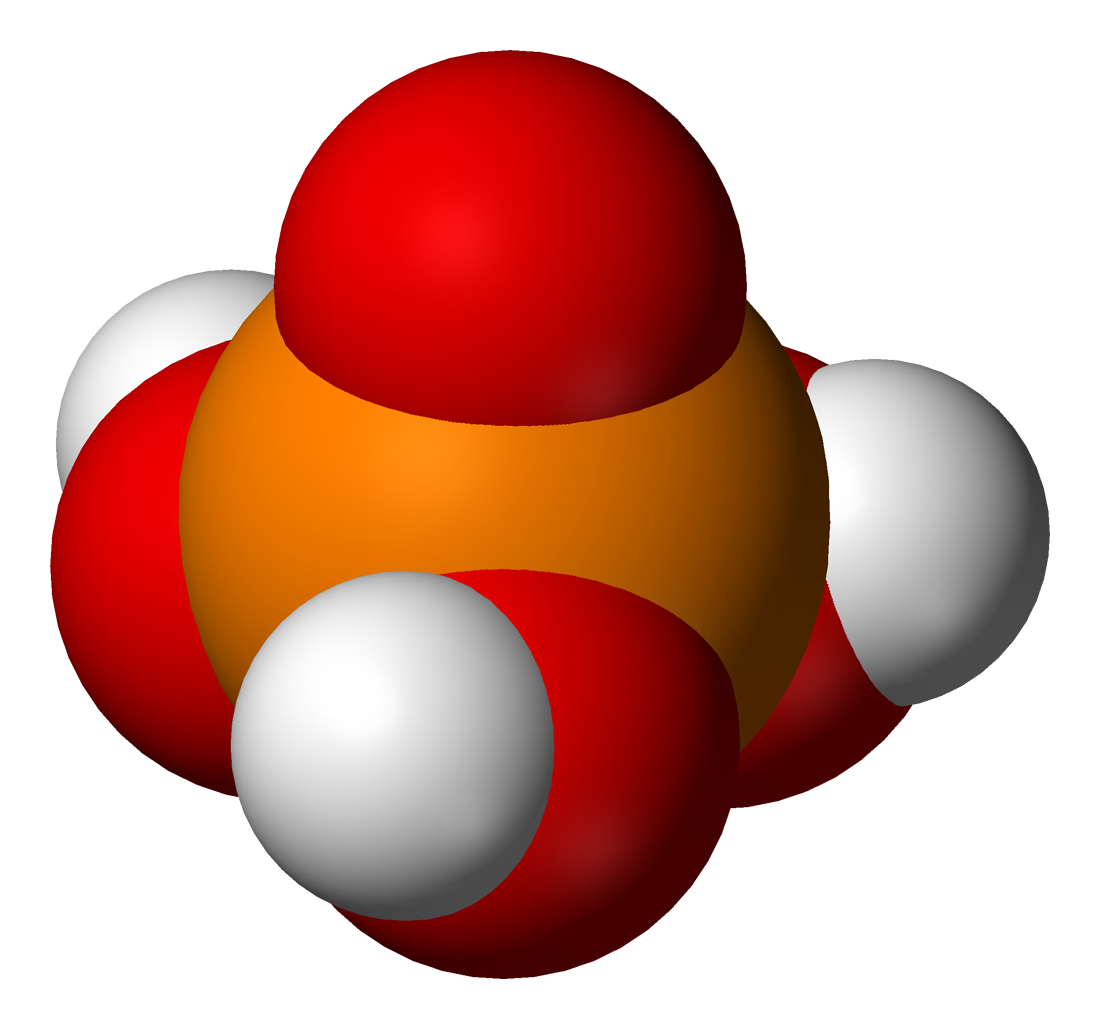
Space-filling model

Names
- IUPAC name Phosphoric acid
- Other names Orthophosphoric acid, hydrogen phosphate

Identifiers
CAS Number	7664-38-2
3D model (JSmol)	Interactive image
ChEBI	CHEBI:26078
ChEMBL	ChEMBL1187
ChemSpider	979
DrugBank	DB09394
ECHA InfoCard	100.028.758
EC Number	231-633-2
E number	E338 (antioxidants, ...)
Gmelin Reference	2000
KEGG	D05467
PubChem CID	1004
RTECS number	TB6300000
UNII	E4GA8884NN
UN number	1805
CompTox Dashboard (EPA)	DTXSID5024263
- InChI: InChI=1S/H3O4P/c1-5(2,3)4/h(H3,1,2,3,4) Key: NBIIXXVUZAFLBC-UHFFFAOYSA-N; InChI=1/H3O4P/c1-5(2,3)4/h(H3,1,2,3,4) Key: NBIIXXVUZAFLBC-UHFFFAOYAI
- SMILES: OP(=O)(O)O

Properties
Chemical formula	H_{3}PO_{4}
Molar mass	97.994 g·mol^{−1}
Appearance	Colorless solid
Odor	Odorless
Density	1.6845 g/cm^{3} (25 °C, 85%), 1.834 g/cm^{3} (solid)
Melting point	42.35 °C (108.23 °F; 315.50 K) anhydrous 29.32 °C (84.78 °F; 302.47 K) hemihydrate
Boiling point	100 °C (212 °F) (only water evaporates)
Solubility in water	392.2 g/(100 g) (−16.3 °C); 369.4 g/(100 mL) (0.5 °C); 446 g/(100 mL) (15 °C); 548 g/(100 mL) (20 °C)
Solubility	Soluble in ethanol
log P	−2.15
Vapor pressure	0.03 mmHg (20 °C)
Conjugate base	Dihydrogen phosphate
Magnetic susceptibility (χ)	−43.8·10^{−6} cm^{3}/mol
Refractive index (n_{D})	1.3420 (8.8% w/w aq. soln.); 1.4320 (85% aq. soln) 25 °C
Viscosity	2.4–9.4 cP (85% aq. soln.); 147 cP (100%)

Structure
Crystal structure	Monoclinic
Molecular shape	Tetrahedral

Thermochemistry
Heat capacity (C)	145.0 J/(mol⋅K)
Std molar entropy (S^{⦵}_{298})	150.8 J/(mol⋅K)
Std enthalpy of formation (Δ_{f}H^{⦵}_{298})	−1271.7 kJ/mol
Gibbs free energy (Δ_{f}G^{⦵})	−1123.6 kJ/mol

Hazards
- GHS labelling
Pictograms	(GHS05: Corrosive)
Signal word	Danger
Hazard statements	H290, H314
Precautionary statements	P280, P305+P351+P338, P310
NFPA 704 (fire diamond)	3 0 0
Flash point	Non-flammable
- Lethal dose or concentration (LD, LC)
LD_{50} (median dose)	1530 mg/kg (rat, oral)
- NIOSH (US health exposure limits)
PEL (Permissible)	TWA 1 mg/m^{3}
REL (Recommended)	TWA 1 mg/m^{3} ST 3 mg/m^{3}
IDLH (Immediate danger)	1000 mg/m^{3}
Safety data sheet (SDS)	ICSC 1008

Related compounds
Related phosphorus oxoacids	Hypophosphorous acid; Phosphorous acid; Pyrophosphoric acid; Triphosphoric acid; Peroxomonophosphoric acid; Peroxodiphosphoric acid
- Except where otherwise noted, data are given for materials in their standard state (at 25 °C [77 °F], 100 kPa). verify (what is ?) Infobox references

Phosphoric acid (orthophosphoric acid, monophosphoric acid or phosphoric(V) acid) is a colorless, odorless phosphorus-containing solid, and inorganic compound with the chemical formula H_{3}PO_{4}. It is commonly encountered as an 85% aqueous solution, which is a colourless, odourless, and non-volatile syrupy liquid. It is a major industrial chemical, being a component of many fertilizers.

The compound is an acid. Removal of all three H^{+} ions gives the phosphate ion PO_{4}^{3−}. Removal of one or two protons gives dihydrogen phosphate ion H_{2}PO_{4}^{−}, and the hydrogen phosphate ion HPO_{4}^{2−}, respectively. Phosphoric acid forms esters, called organophosphates.

The name "orthophosphoric acid" can be used to distinguish this specific acid from other "phosphoric acids", such as pyrophosphoric acid. Nevertheless, the term "phosphoric acid" often means this specific compound; and that is the current IUPAC nomenclature.

== Production ==
Phosphoric acid is produced industrially by one of two routes, wet processes and dry.

=== Wet process ===
In the wet process, phosphate-containing minerals such as calcium hydroxyapatite or fluorapatite are treated with sulfuric acid.

Ca_{5}(PO_{4})_{3}OH + 5 H_{2}SO_{4} → 3 H_{3}PO_{4} + 5 CaSO_{4} + H_{2}O
Ca_{5}(PO_{4})_{3}F + 5 H_{2}SO_{4} → 3 H_{3}PO_{4} + 5 CaSO_{4} + HF

By-products include calcium sulfate (CaSO_{4}) and hydrogen fluoride (HF). The HF gas may be recovered by streaming it into a wet (water) scrubber producing hydrofluoric acid. CaSO_{4} is better known as gypsum, which is commonly used in the construction industry, however the CaSO_{4} produced from phosphoric acid production can contain trace levels of radioactive elements such as radium. This makes it unsuitable for commercial use, and it is called phosphogypsum to distinguish it. It is typically stored indefinitely.

In both cases the phosphoric acid solution usually contains 23–33% P_{2}O_{5} (32–46% H_{3}PO_{4}). It may be concentrated to produce commercial- or merchant-grade phosphoric acid, which contains about 54–62% P_{2}O_{5} (75–85% H_{3}PO_{4}). Further removal of water yields superphosphoric acid with a P_{2}O_{5} concentration above 70% (corresponding to nearly 100% H_{3}PO_{4}). The phosphoric acid from both processes may be further purified by removing compounds of arsenic and other potentially toxic impurities.

=== Dry process ===
To produce food-grade phosphoric acid, phosphate ore is first reduced with coke in an electric arc furnace, to give elemental phosphorus. This process is also known as the thermal process or the electric furnace process. Silica is also added, resulting in the production of calcium silicate slag. Elemental phosphorus is distilled out of the furnace and burned with air to produce high-purity phosphorus pentoxide, which is dissolved in water to make phosphoric acid. The thermal process produces phosphoric acid with a very high concentration of P_{2}O_{5} (about 85%) and a low level of impurities.

However, this process is more expensive and energy-intensive than the wet process, which produces phosphoric acid with a lower concentration of P_{2}O_{5} (about 26–52%) and a higher level of impurities. The wet process is the most common method of producing phosphoric acid for fertilizer use. Even in China, where the thermal process is still used quite widely due to relatively cheap coal as opposed to the sulfuric acid, over 7/8 of phosphoric acid is produced with wet process.

== Purification ==
Phosphoric acid produced from phosphate rock or thermal processes often requires purification. A common purification method is liquid–liquid extraction, which involves the separation of phosphoric acid from water and other impurities using organic solvents, such as tributyl phosphate (TBP), methyl isobutyl ketone (MIBK), or n-octanol. Nanofiltration involves the use of a premodified nanofiltration membrane, which is functionalized by a deposit of a high molecular weight polycationic polymer of polyethyleneimines. Nanofiltration has been shown to significantly reduce the concentrations of various impurities, including cadmium, aluminum, iron, and rare earth elements. The laboratory and industrial pilot scale results showed that this process allows the production of food-grade phosphoric acid.

Fractional crystallization can achieve higher purities typically used for semiconductor applications. Usually a static crystallizer is used. A static crystallizer uses vertical plates, which are suspended in the molten feed and which are alternatingly cooled and heated by a heat transfer medium. The process begins with the slow cooling of the heat transfer medium below the freezing point of the stagnant melt. This cooling causes a layer of crystals to grow on the plates. Impurities are rejected from the growing crystals and are concentrated in the remaining melt. After the desired fraction has been crystallized, the remaining melt is drained from the crystallizer. The purer crystalline layer remains adhered to the plates. In a subsequent step, the plates are heated again to liquify the crystals and the purified phosphoric acid drained into the product vessel. The crystallizer is filled with feed again and the next cooling cycle is started.

== Properties ==
=== Acidic properties ===
In aqueous solution phosphoric acid behaves as a triprotic acid.

H_{3}PO_{4} ⇌ H_{2}PO_{4}^{−} + H^{+}, pK_{a1} = 2.14
H_{2}PO_{4}^{−} ⇌ HPO_{4}^{2−} + H^{+}, pK_{a2} = 7.20
HPO_{4}^{2−} ⇌ PO_{4}^{3−} + H^{+}, pK_{a3} = 12.37

The difference between successive pK_{a} values is sufficiently large so that salts of either monohydrogen phosphate, HPO_{4}^{2−} or dihydrogen phosphate, H_{2}PO_{4}^{−}, can be prepared from a solution of phosphoric acid by adjusting the pH to be mid-way between the respective pK_{a} values.

=== Aqueous solutions ===
Aqueous solutions up to 62.5% H_{3}PO_{4} are eutectic, exhibiting freezing-point depression as low as −85 °C. When the concentration of acid rises above 62.5% the freezing-point increases, reaching 21 °C by 85% H_{3}PO_{4} (w/w; the monohydrate). Beyond this the phase diagram becomes complicated, with significant local maxima and minima. For this reason phosphoric acid is rarely sold above 85%, as beyond this adding or removing small amounts of moisture risks the entire mass freezing solid, which would be a major problem on a large scale. There exists a local maximum at 91.6% which corresponds to the hemihydrate 2H_{3}PO_{4}•H_{2}O, freezing at 29.32 °C. There is a second smaller eutectic depression at a concentration of 94.75% with a freezing point of 23.5 °C. At higher concentrations the freezing point rapidly increases. Concentrated phosphoric acid tends to supercool before crystallization occurs, and may be relatively resistant to crystallisation even when stored below the freezing point.

=== Self condensation ===
Phosphoric acid is commercially available as aqueous solutions of various concentrations, not usually exceeding 85%. If concentrated further it undergoes slow self-condensation, forming an equilibrium with pyrophosphoric acid:

2 H_{3}PO_{4} ⇌ H_{2}O + H_{4}P_{2}O_{7}

Even at 90% concentration the amount of pyrophosphoric acid present is negligible, but beyond 95% it starts to increase, reaching 15% at what would have otherwise been 100% orthophosphoric acid.

As the concentration is increased higher acids are formed, culminating in the formation of polyphosphoric acids. It is not possible to fully dehydrate phosphoric acid to phosphorus pentoxide, instead the polyphosphoric acid becomes increasingly polymeric and viscous. Due to the self-condensation, pure orthophosphoric acid can only be obtained by a careful fractional freezing/melting process.

== Uses ==
The dominant use of phosphoric acid is for fertilizers, consuming approximately 90% of production.

The remaining 10% is primarily used in soaps and detergents:

Application	Demand (2006) in thousands of tons	Main phosphate derivatives
Soaps and detergents	1836	STPP (Na_{5}P_{3}O_{10})
Food industry	309	STPP, SHMP, TSP, SAPP, SAlP, MCP, DSP (Na_{2}HPO_{4}), H_{3}PO_{4}
Water treatment	164	SHMP, STPP, TSPP, MSP (NaH_{2}PO_{4}), DSP
Toothpastes	68	DCP (CaHPO_{4}), IMP, SMFP
Other applications	287	STPP, TCP, APP, DAP, zinc phosphate (Zn_{3}(PO_{4})_{2}), aluminium phosphate (AlPO_{4}), H_{3}PO_{4}

Food-grade phosphoric acid (additive E338) is used to acidify foods and beverages such as various colas and jams, providing a tangy or sour taste. The phosphoric acid also serves as a preservative. Soft drinks containing phosphoric acid, which would include Coca-Cola, are sometimes called phosphate sodas or phosphates. Phosphoric acid in soft drinks has the potential to cause dental erosion. Phosphoric acid also has the potential to contribute to the formation of kidney stones, especially in those who have had kidney stones previously.

Specific applications of phosphoric acid include:

- in anti-rust (iron and steel oxidation) treatment by phosphate conversion coating or passivation, including the Parkerization process
- as an external standard for phosphorus-31 nuclear magnetic resonance
- in phosphoric acid fuel cells
- in activated carbon production
- in compound semiconductor processing, to etch Indium gallium arsenide selectively with respect to indium phosphide
- in microfabrication to etch silicon nitride selectively with respect to silicon dioxide
- in microfabrication to etch aluminium
- as a pH adjuster in cosmetics and skin-care products
- as a sanitizing agent in the dairy, food, and brewing industries
- in chemical polishing (etching) of metals like aluminium

== Safety ==
Phosphoric acid is not a strong acid. However, at moderate concentrations phosphoric acid solutions are irritating to the skin. Contact with concentrated solutions can cause severe skin burns and permanent eye damage.

== See also ==
- Phosphate fertilizers, such as ammonium phosphate fertilizers
- Chiral phosphoric acid

== Cited sources ==
- Haynes, William M., ed. (2011). CRC Handbook of Chemistry and Physics (92nd ed.). CRC Press. ISBN 978-1-4398-5511-9.
