= Zaltoprofen =

COX-2 selective NSAID medication

Clinical data
- Trade names: Soleton
- Other names: Zaxoprofen
- Drug class: NSAID

Legal status
- Legal status: US: Not FDA approved; Japan: Rx-only

Identifiers
- IUPAC name: 2-(6-Oxo-5H-benzo[b][1]benzothiepin-3-yl)propanoic acid
- CAS Number: 74711-43-6
- PubChem CID: 5720
- DrugBank: DB06737
- UNII: H8635NG3PY
- CompTox Dashboard (EPA): DTXSID0049076
- ECHA InfoCard: 100.070.863

Chemical and physical data
- Formula: C_{17}H_{14}O_{3}S
- Molar mass: 298.36 g·mol^{−1}
- 3D model (JSmol): Interactive image
- SMILES: CC(C1=CC2=C(C=C1)SC3=CC=CC=C3C(=O)C2)C(=O)O

Zaltoprofen (JAN; trade name Soleton) is a nonsteroidal anti-inflammatory drug (NSAID) used as an analgesic, antipyretic, and anti-inflammatory agent. It is a selective COX-2 inhibitor and also inhibits bradykinin-induced pain responses without blocking bradykinin receptors.

It was approved for use in Japan in 1993.
