= Sodium hexametaphosphate =

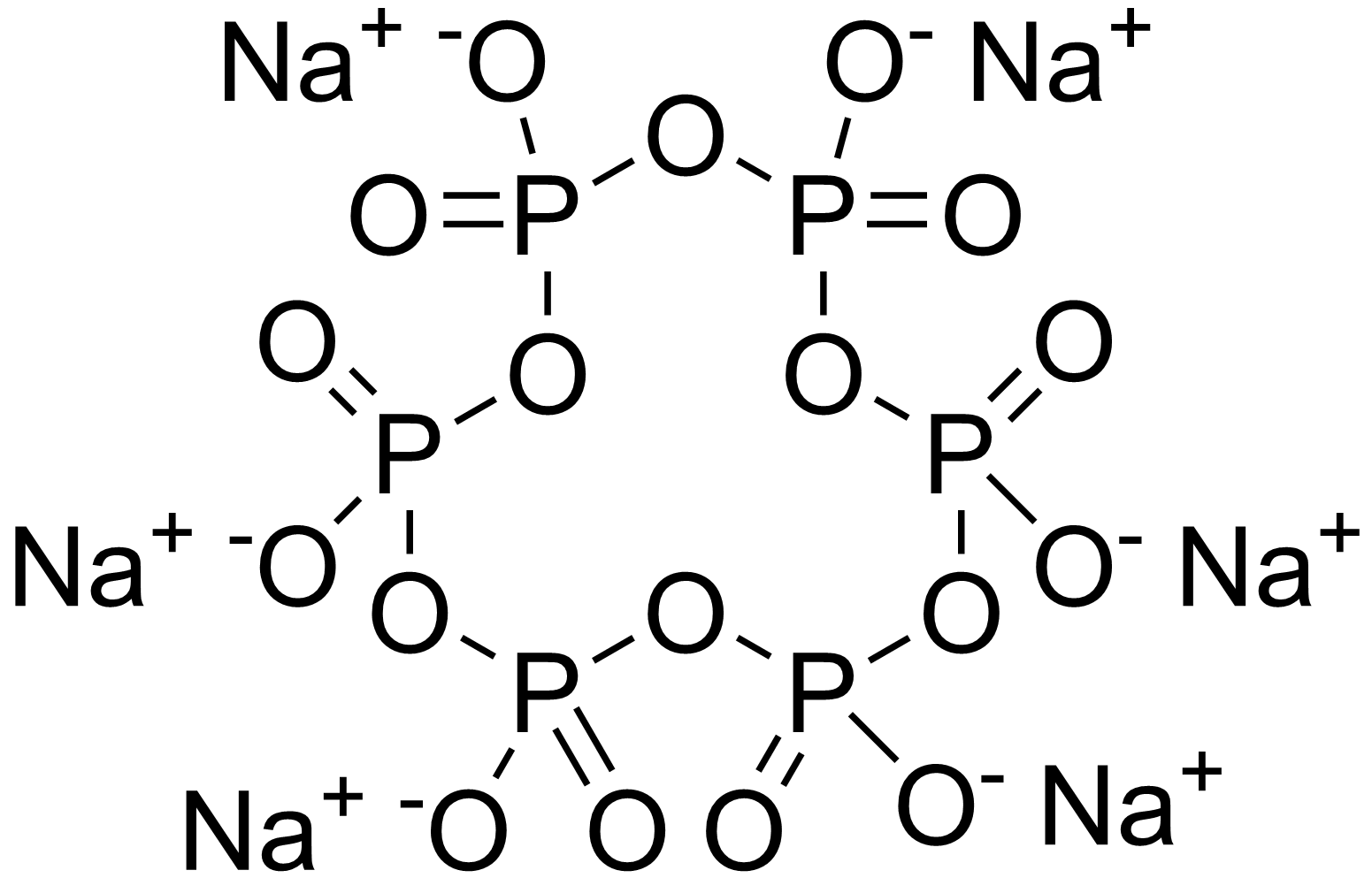
- Skeletal formula of sodium hexametaphosphate

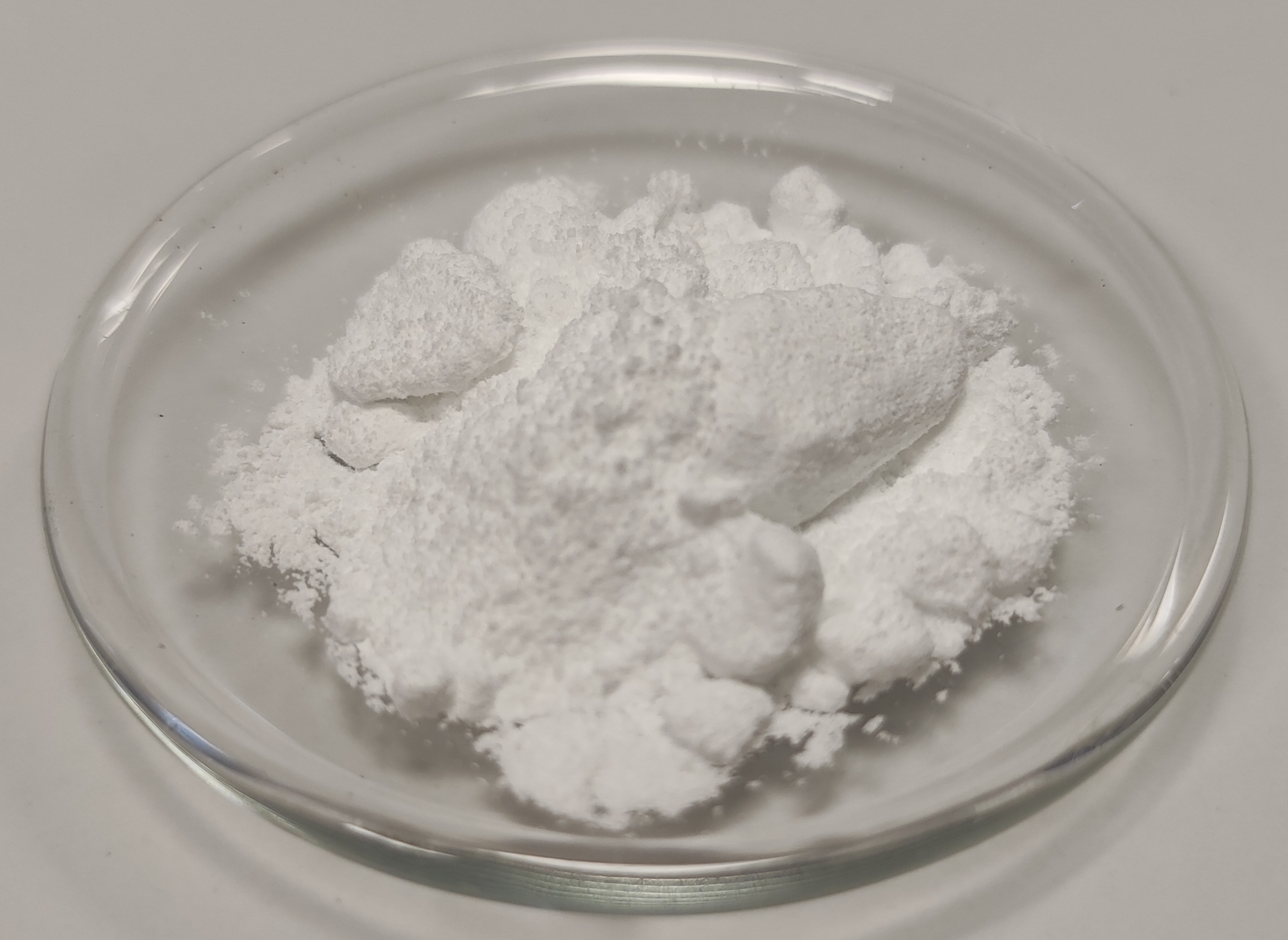

Names
- IUPAC name sodium cyclo-hexaphosphate
- Other names: Calgon S; Glassy sodium; Graham's salt; Hexasodium metaphosphate; Metaphosphoric acid, hexasodium salt

Identifiers
CAS Number	10124-56-8
3D model (JSmol)	Interactive image
ChemSpider	23340
ECHA InfoCard	100.030.299
EC Number	233-343-1
MeSH	sodium+polymetaphosphate
PubChem CID	24968
UNII	N40N91DW96
CompTox Dashboard (EPA)	DTXSID1047522
- InChI: InChI=1S/6Na.H6O18P6/c;;;;;;1-19(2)13-20(3,4)15-22(7,8)17-24(11,12)18-23(9,10)16-21(5,6)14-19/h;;;;;;(H,1,2)(H,3,4)(H,5,6)(H,7,8)(H,9,10)(H,11,12)/q6*+1;/p-6 Key: GCLGEJMYGQKIIW-UHFFFAOYSA-H
- SMILES: [O-]P1(=O)OP(=O)([O-])OP(=O)([O-])OP(=O)(OP(=O)(OP(=O)(O1)[O-])[O-])[O-].[Na+].[Na+].[Na+].[Na+].[Na+].[Na+]

Properties
Chemical formula	Na_{6}[(PO_{3})_{6}]
Molar mass	611.7704 g mol^{−1}
Appearance	White crystals
Odor	odorless
Density	2.484 g/cm^{3}
Melting point	628 °C (1,162 °F; 901 K)
Boiling point	1,500 °C (2,730 °F; 1,770 K)
Solubility in water	soluble
Solubility	insoluble in organic solvents
Refractive index (n_{D})	1.482

Hazards
- Occupational safety and health (OHS/OSH)
Main hazards	Irritant
- GHS labelling
Pictograms	(GHS07: Exclamation mark)
Signal word	Warning
Hazard statements	H319
- Lethal dose or concentration (LD, LC)
LD_{50} (median dose)	3.053 g kg^{−1}
- Safety data sheet (SDS)

Related compounds
Other anions	Trisodium phosphate Tetrasodium pyrophosphate Pentasodium triphosphate
Related compounds	Sodium trimetaphosphate
- Except where otherwise noted, data are given for materials in their standard state (at 25 °C [77 °F], 100 kPa). verify (what is ?) Infobox references

Sodium hexametaphosphate (SHMP) is an inorganic compound with the chemical formula Na_{6}[(PO_{3})_{6}]. Sodium hexametaphosphate of technical grade is typically a mixture of metaphosphates (empirical formula: NaPO_{3}), of which the hexamer is one, and is usually the compound referred to by this name. Such a mixture is more correctly termed sodium polymetaphosphate. They are also known as sodium polyphosphate or Graham's salt, from the Scottish chemist Thomas Graham, who coined the name sodium metaphosphate. They are white solids that dissolve in water.

== Preparation ==
SHMP is prepared by heating monosodium orthophosphate to generate sodium acid pyrophosphate:

2 NaH_{2}PO_{4} → Na_{2}H_{2}P_{2}O_{7} + H_{2}O

Subsequently, the pyrophosphate is heated to give the corresponding sodium hexametaphosphate:

3 Na_{2}H_{2}P_{2}O_{7} → (NaPO_{3})_{6} + 3 H_{2}O

followed by rapid cooling.

== Uses ==
SHMP is used as a sequestrant and has applications in a wide variety of industries, including as a food additive under the E number E452i. Sodium carbonate is sometimes added to SHMP to raise the pH to 8.0–8.6, which produces a number of SHMP products used for water softening and detergents.

A significant use for sodium hexametaphosphate is as a deflocculant in the production of clay-based ceramic particles. It is also used as a dispersing agent to break down clay and other soil types for soil texture assessment.

It is used as an active ingredient in toothpastes as an anti-staining and tartar prevention ingredient.

=== Food additive ===
As a food additive, SHMP is used as an emulsifier. Artificial maple syrup, canned milk, cheese powders and dips, imitation cheese, whipped topping, packaged egg whites, roast beef, fish fillets, fruit jelly, frozen desserts, salad dressing, herring, breakfast cereal, ice cream, beer, and bottled drinks, among other foods, can contain SHMP.

=== Water softener salt ===
SHMP is used in Diamond Crystal brand Bright & Soft Salt Pellets for water softeners in a concentration of 0.03%. It is the only additive other than sodium chloride.

== Reactions ==
SHMP hydrolyzes in aqueous solution, particularly under acidic conditions and/or heat, to sodium trimetaphosphate and sodium orthophosphate.

== History ==
Sodium hexametaphosphate is the alkali salt of one of the series of polymetaphosphoric acids (acids formed by the polymerization of phosphate groups). Hexametaphosphoric acid was first prepared in 1825 by the German chemist Johann Frederich Philipp Engelhart (1797–1853). For his doctoral thesis, Engelhart intended to determine whether iron was responsible for the red color of blood. To purify his blood samples, Engelhart found that he could coagulate the blood serum's albumin (dissolved proteins) by treating the blood with phosphoric acid. This contradicted the findings of the famous Swedish chemist Jöns Jacob Berzelius, who had stated that phosphoric acid did not coagulate water-soluble proteins such as egg white. Berzelius and Engelhart collaborated with the intention of resolving the contradiction; they concluded that Engelhart had produced a new form of phosphoric acid simply by burning phosphorus in air and then dissolving the resulting substance in water. However, they did not determine the new acid's composition. That analysis was accomplished in 1833 by the Scottish chemist Thomas Graham, who named the sodium salt of the new acid "metaphosphate of soda". Graham's findings were confirmed by the German chemists Justus von Liebig and Theodor Fleitmann. In 1849, Fleitmann coined the name "hexametaphosphoric acid".

By 1956, chromatographic analysis of hydrolysates of Graham's salt (sodium polyphosphate) indicated the presence of cyclic anions containing more than four phosphate groups; these findings were confirmed in 1961. In 1963, the German chemists Erich Thilo and Ulrich Schülke succeeded in preparing sodium hexametaphosphate by heating anhydrous sodium trimetaphosphate.

== Safety ==
Sodium phosphates are recognized to have low acute oral toxicity. SHMP concentrations not exceeding 10,000 mg/L or mg/kg are considered protective levels by the EFSA and US FDA. Extreme concentrations of this salt may cause acute side effects from excessive blood serum concentrations of sodium, such as: “irregular pulse, bradycardia, and hypocalcemia."
