= Metaphosphate =

Chemical compound

Trimetaphosphate is a cyclic trimer formed by the self reaction of metaphosphate ions

A metaphosphate ion is an oxyanion that has the empirical formula PO^{−}_{3}. It was first postulated in 1955 but was not observed until 1979, when it was detected by mass spectrometry. Metaphosphate is an intermediate in the hydrolysis of phosphate esters but it is difficult to isolate, as it readily hydrolyses to from a dihydrogen phosphate ion ([H_{2}PO_{4}]^{−}) and tends to self-react in the absence of water to form rings or infinite chains: These species are also called metaphosphates and are generally stable, with some such as sodium trimetaphosphate being produced on an industrial scale.

Metaphosphates can be used as an alternative of white phosphorus in organic syntheses.

== See also ==
- Sodium trimetaphosphate
- Sodium hexametaphosphate
- Potassium metaphosphate
