= Monosodium phosphate =

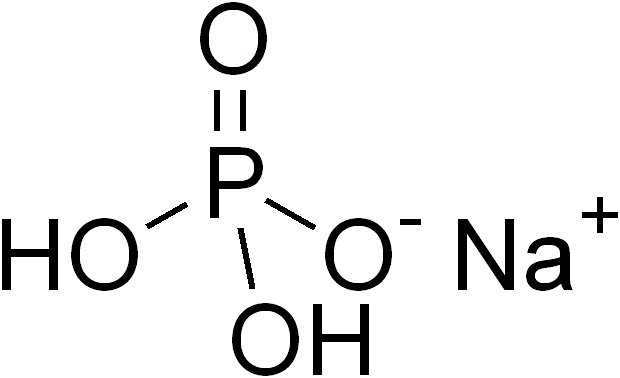

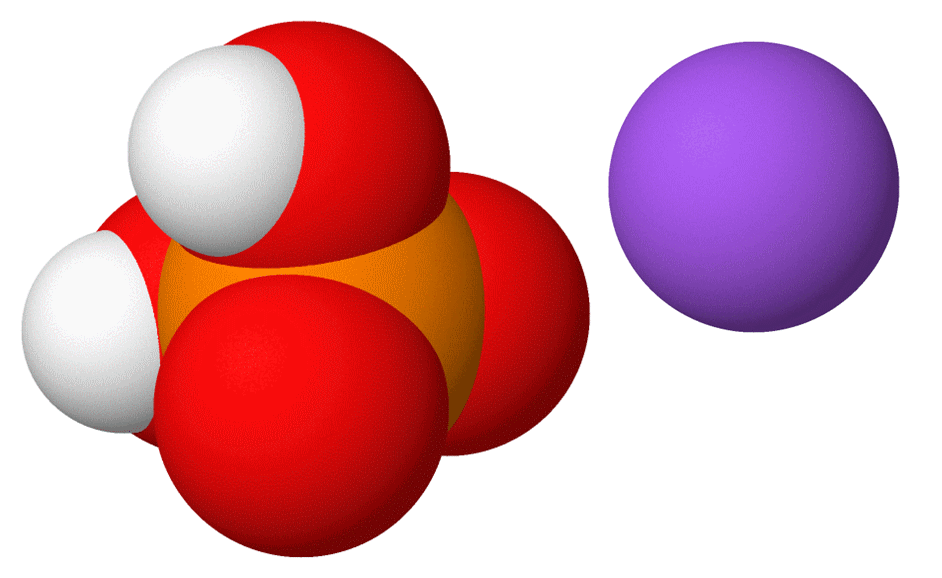
- Ball-and-stick model of the dihydrogenphosphate anion Phosphorus, P Oxygen, O Hydrogen, H Sodium, Na

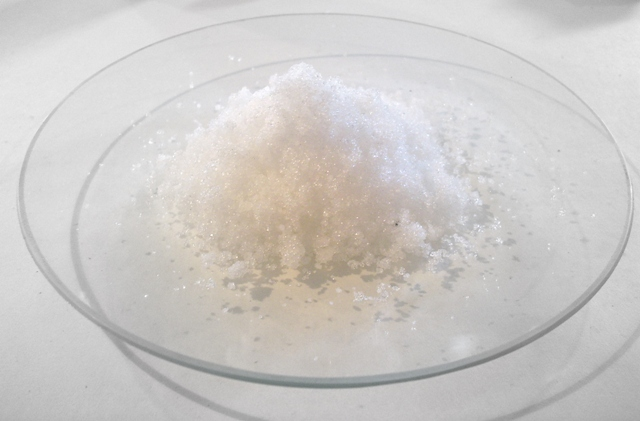

Names
- IUPAC name Sodium dihydrogen phosphate
- Other names: Monobasic sodium phosphate; Sodium biphosphate

Identifiers
CAS Number	7558-80-7
3D model (JSmol)	Interactive image
ChEBI	CHEBI:37585
ChEMBL	ChEMBL1368
ChemSpider	22626
ECHA InfoCard	100.028.591
E number	E339(i) (antioxidants, ...)
PubChem CID	24204
UNII	KH7I04HPUU
CompTox Dashboard (EPA)	DTXSID7035222
- InChI: InChI=1S/Na.H3O4P/c;1-5(2,3)4/h;(H3,1,2,3,4)/q+1;/p-1 Key: AJPJDKMHJJGVTQ-UHFFFAOYSA-M
- SMILES: [Na+].[O-]P(=O)(O)O

Properties
Chemical formula	NaH_{2}PO_{4}
Molar mass	119.976 g·mol^{−1}
Appearance	White powder or crystals
Density	2.36 g/cm^{3} (anhydrous)
Solubility in water	59.90 g/(100 mL) (0°C)

Hazards
NFPA 704 (fire diamond)	0 0 0
Flash point	Non-flammable

Related compounds
Other cations	Monopotassium phosphate; Monoammonium phosphate
Related compounds	Disodium phosphate; Trisodium phosphate
- Except where otherwise noted, data are given for materials in their standard state (at 25 °C [77 °F], 100 kPa). verify (what is ?) Infobox references

Monosodium phosphate (MSP), also known as monobasic sodium phosphate and sodium dihydrogen phosphate, is an inorganic compound with the chemical formula NaH_{2}PO_{4}. It is a sodium salt of phosphoric acid. It consists of sodium cations (Na^{+}) and dihydrogen phosphate anions (H_{2}PO_{4}^{−}). One of many sodium phosphates, it is a common industrial chemical. The salt exists in an anhydrous form, as well as monohydrate and dihydrate (NaH_{2}PO_{4}·H_{2}O and NaH_{2}PO_{4}·2H_{2}O respectively).

== Production and reactions ==
The salt is obtained by partial neutralization of phosphoric acid.

The pK_{a} of monosodium phosphate is 6.8-7.2 (depending on the physicochemical characteristics during pK_{a} determination).

Heating this salt above 169 °C gives disodium pyrophosphate:

2 NaH_{2}PO_{4} → Na_{2}H_{2}P_{2}O_{7} + H_{2}O

When heated at 550 °C, anhydrous trisodium trimetaphosphate is formed:

3 NaH_{2}PO_{4} → Na_{3}P_{3}O_{9} + 3 H_{2}O

== Uses ==
Phosphates are often used in foods and in water treatment. The pH of such formulations is adjusted by mixtures of various sodium phosphates, such as this salt. It is added in animal feed for its nutritional value.
