= Sodium trimetaphosphate =

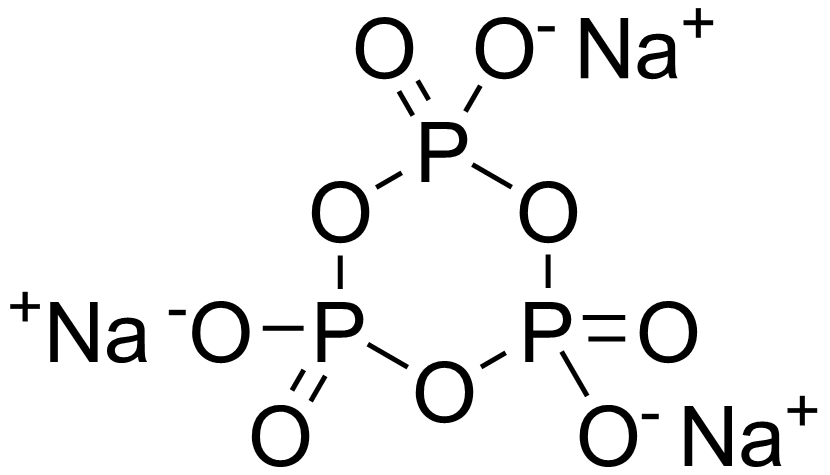

Identifiers
CAS Number	7785-84-4; hexahydrate: 29856-33-5
3D model (JSmol)	Interactive image; hexahydrate: Interactive image
ChEMBL	ChEMBL2107557
ChemSpider	22983; hexahydrate: 14394484
ECHA InfoCard	100.029.171
EC Number	232-088-3
KEGG	D02423
PubChem CID	24579; hexahydrate: 19755115
UNII	3IH6169RL0; hexahydrate: 9B14301IW7
CompTox Dashboard (EPA)	DTXSID7052789
- InChI: InChI=1S/3Na.H3O9P3/c;;;1-10(2)7-11(3,4)9-12(5,6)8-10/h;;;(H,1,2)(H,3,4)(H,5,6)/q3*+1;/p-3 Key: UGTZMIPZNRIWHX-UHFFFAOYSA-K; hexahydrate: InChI=1S/3Na.H3O9P3.6H2O/c;;;1-10(2)7-11(3,4)9-12(5,6)8-10;;;;;;/h;;;(H,1,2)(H,3,4)(H,5,6);6*1H2/q3*+1;;;;;;;/p-3 Key: LHBMIJXEORAANY-UHFFFAOYSA-K
- SMILES: O=P(OP(O1)([O-])=O)([O-])OP1([O-])=O.[Na+].[Na+].[Na+]; hexahydrate: O.O.O.O.O.O.[O-]P1(=O)OP(=O)(OP(=O)(O1)[O-])[O-].[Na+].[Na+].[Na+]

Properties
Chemical formula	Na_{3}P_{3}O_{9}
Molar mass	305.885 g/mol
Appearance	colorless or white crystals
Density	2.49 g/cm^{3} (anhydrous); 1.786 g/cm^{3} (hexahydrate)
Melting point	53 °C (127 °F; 326 K) (hexahydrate, decomposes to anyhdrous)
Solubility in water	22 g/100 mL
Solubility	insoluble in alcohol
Refractive index (n_{D})	1.433 (hexahydrate)

Structure
Crystal structure	triclinic (hexahydrate)
- Except where otherwise noted, data are given for materials in their standard state (at 25 °C [77 °F], 100 kPa). verify (what is ?) Infobox references

Sodium trimetaphosphate (also STMP) is an inorganic compound with the chemical formula Na_{3}P_{3}O_{9}. It is one of the metaphosphates of sodium, the sodium salt of trimetaphosphoric acid. The hexahydrate Na_{3}P_{3}O_{9}·(H_{2}O)_{6} is also well known. It is a colourless solid.

Although drawn with a particular resonance structure, the trianion has high symmetry.

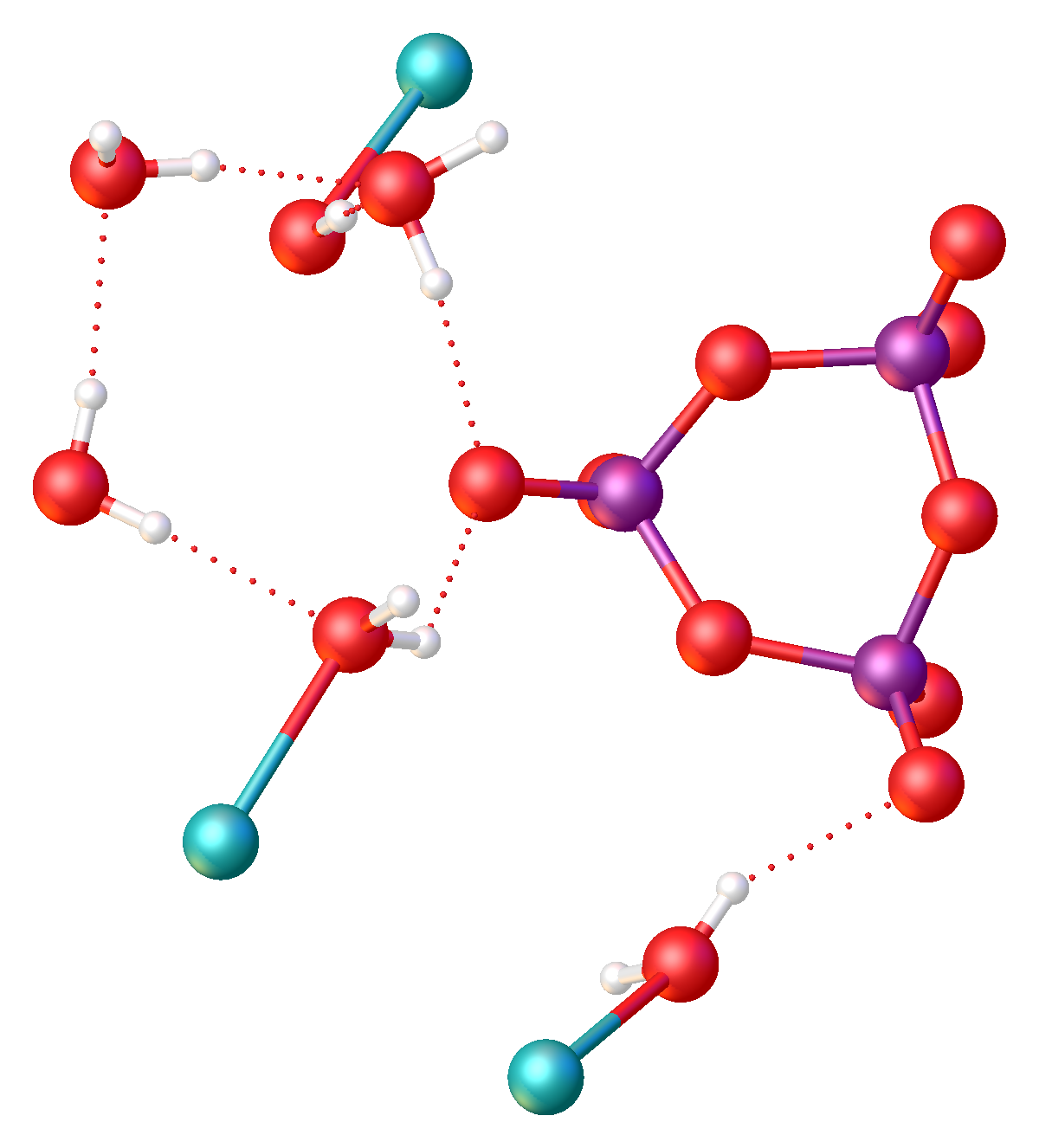
Portion of the solid state structure of Na_{3}P_{3}O_{9}·(H_{2}O)_{6}, as determined by X-ray crystallography. Highlighted is the P3O9 ring and some hydrogen bonding. Atoms are color coded as: purple = P, red = O, cyan = Na, white = H.

== Synthesis and reactions ==
Trisodium trimetaphosphate is produced industrially by heating sodium dihydrogen phosphate to 550 °C, a method first developed in 1955:

3 NaH_{2}PO_{4} → Na_{3}P_{3}O_{9} + 3 H_{2}O

The trimetaphosphate dissolves in water and is precipitated by the addition of sodium chloride (common ion effect), affording the hexahydrate.

STMP can also prepared by heating samples of sodium polyphosphate, or by a thermal reaction of orthophosphoric acid and sodium chloride at 600 °C.

3 H_{3}PO_{4} + 3 NaCl → Na_{3}P_{3}O_{9} + 3 H_{2}O + 3 HCl

Hydrolysis of the ring leads to the acyclic sodium triphosphate:

Na_{3}P_{3}O_{9} + H_{2}O → H_{2}Na_{3}P_{3}O_{10}

The analogous reaction of the metatriphosphate anion involves ring opening by amine nucleophiles.

== Uses ==
The compound finds specialised applications in food and construction industries: it is used as a phosphorylating agent for ascorbic acid to stabilize vitamin C mixtures against thermal decomposition; in the construction industry, sodium trimetaphosphate is used to prevent the shrinkage of gypsum plaster boards and as a setting retarder for gypsum plaster.
