= Disodium phosphate =

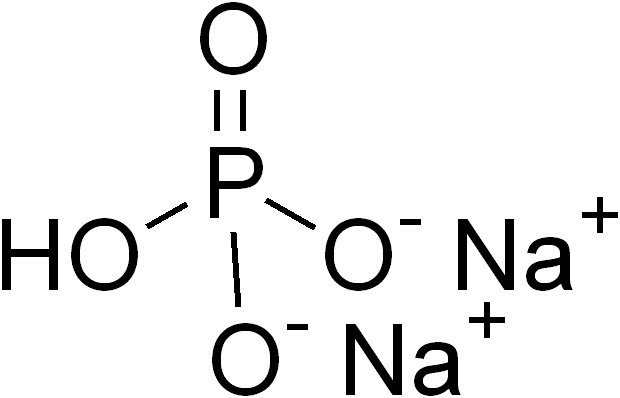

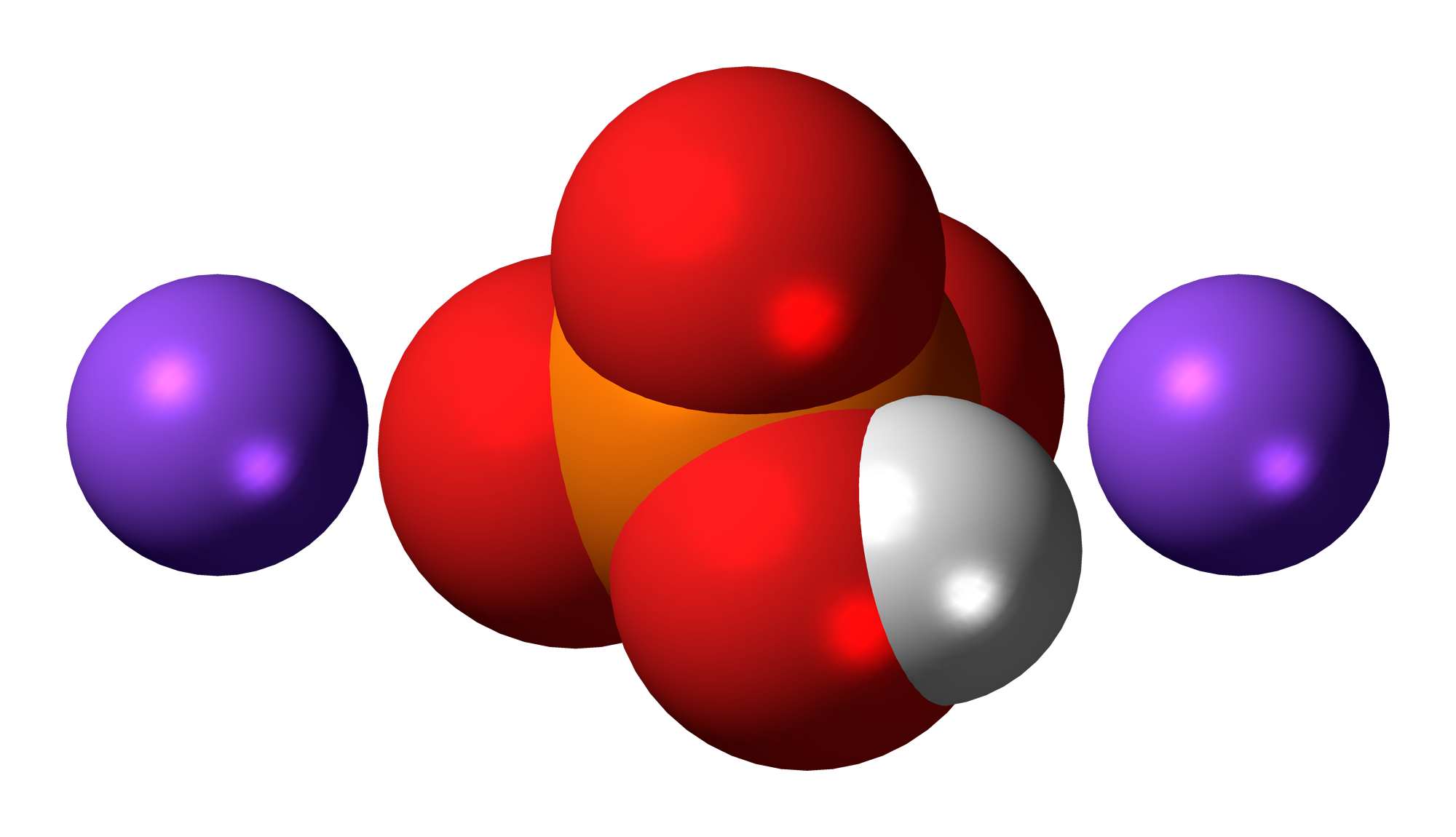
- Sodium, Na Phosphorus, P Oxygen, O Hydrogen, H

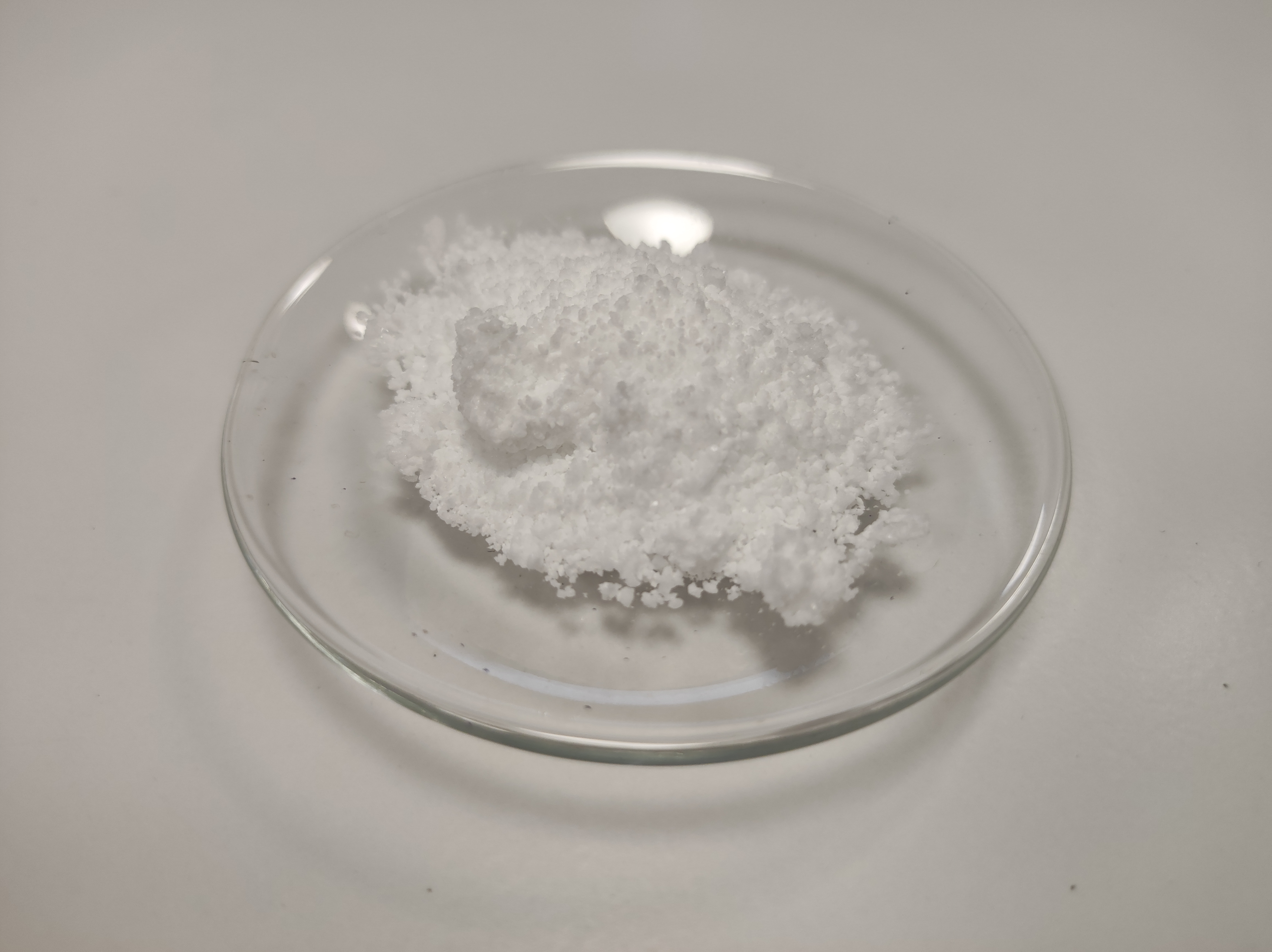

Names
- IUPAC name Disodium hydrogen phosphate
- Other names: Acetest; Dibasic sodium phosphate; Disodium hydrogen orthophosphate; Disodium hydrogen phosphate; Disodium phosphate; Sodium phosphate dibasic

Identifiers
CAS Number	7558-79-4; 10028-24-7 (dihydrate); 7782-85-6 (heptahydrate); 10039-32-4 (dodecahydrate)
3D model (JSmol)	Interactive image
ChEBI	CHEBI:34683
ChEMBL	ChEMBL1060
ChemSpider	22625
ECHA InfoCard	100.028.590
EC Number	231-448-7
E number	E339(ii) (antioxidants, ...)
PubChem CID	24203
RTECS number	WC4500000
UNII	22ADO53M6F; 94255I6E2T (dihydrate); 70WT22SF4B (heptahydrate); E1W4N241FO (dodecahydrate)
CompTox Dashboard (EPA)	DTXSID1026039
- InChI: InChI=1S/2Na.H3O4P/c;;1-5(2,3)4/h;;(H3,1,2,3,4)/q2*+1;/p-3 Key: BNIILDVGGAEEIG-UHFFFAOYSA-K; InChI=1/2Na.H3O4P/c;;1-5(2,3)4/h;;(H3,1,2,3,4)/q2*+1;/p-3 Key: BNIILDVGGAEEIG-DFZHHIFOAK
- SMILES: OP(=O)([O-])[O-].[Na+].[Na+]

Properties
Chemical formula	Na_{2}HPO_{4}
Molar mass	141.96 g/mol (anhydrous); 177.99 g/mol (dihydrate); 268.07 g/mol (heptahydrate)
Appearance	White crystalline solid
Odor	Odorless
Density	1.7 g/cm^{3}
Melting point	250 °C (482 °F; 523 K) Decomposes
Solubility in water	7.7 g/(100 ml) (20 °C); 11.8 g/(100 ml) (25 °C, heptahydrate)
Solubility	Insoluble in ethanol
log P	−5.8
Acidity (pK_{a})	12.35
Magnetic susceptibility (χ)	−56.6·10^{−6} cm^{3}/mol
Refractive index (n_{D})	1.35644 to 1.35717 at 20°C

Hazards
- Occupational safety and health (OHS/OSH)
Main hazards	Irritant
NFPA 704 (fire diamond)	1 0 0
Flash point	Non-flammable
- Lethal dose or concentration (LD, LC)
LD_{50} (median dose)	17000 mg/kg (rat, oral)
Safety data sheet (SDS)	ICSC 1129

Related compounds
Other anions	sodium phosphite
Other cations	Dipotassium phosphate Diammonium phosphate
Related compounds	Monosodium phosphate Trisodium phosphate
- Except where otherwise noted, data are given for materials in their standard state (at 25 °C [77 °F], 100 kPa). verify (what is ?) Infobox references

Disodium phosphate (DSP), or disodium hydrogen phosphate, or sodium phosphate dibasic, is an inorganic compound with the chemical formula Na_{2}HPO_{4}. It is one of several sodium phosphates. The salt is known in anhydrous form as well as hydrates Na_{2}HPO_{4}·nH_{2}O, where n is 2, 7, 8, and 12. All are water-soluble white powders. The anhydrous salt is hygroscopic.

The pH of disodium hydrogen phosphate water solution is between 8.0 and 11.0, meaning it is moderately basic:

HPO^{2−}_{4} + H_{2}O ⇌ H_{2}PO^{−}_{4} + OH^{−}

== Production and reactions ==
It can be generated by neutralization of phosphoric acid with sodium hydroxide:

H_{3}PO_{4} + 2 NaOH → Na_{2}HPO_{4} + 2 H_{2}O

Industrially it is prepared in a two-step process by treating dicalcium phosphate with sodium bisulfate, which precipitates calcium sulfate:

CaHPO_{4} + NaHSO_{4} → NaH_{2}PO_{4} + CaSO_{4}

In the second step, the resulting solution of monosodium phosphate is partially neutralized:

NaH_{2}PO_{4} + NaOH → Na_{2}HPO_{4} + H_{2}O

== Uses ==
It is used in conjunction with trisodium phosphate in foods and water softening treatment. In foods, it is used to adjust pH. Its presence prevents coagulation in the preparation of condensed milk. Similarly, it is used as an anti-caking additive in powdered products. It is used in desserts and puddings, e.g. Cream of Wheat to quicken cook time, and Jell-O Instant Pudding for thickening. In water treatment, it retards calcium scale formation. It is also found in some detergents and cleaning agents.

Heating solid disodium phosphate gives the useful compound tetrasodium pyrophosphate:

2 Na_{2}HPO_{4} → Na_{4}P_{2}O_{7} + H_{2}O

=== Laxative ===
Monobasic and dibasic sodium phosphate are used as a saline laxative to treat constipation or to clean the bowel before a colonoscopy.
