= Polyphosphate =

Compounds formed from phosphate monomeric units

A polyphosphate is a salt or ester of polymeric oxyanions formed from tetrahedral PO_{4} (phosphate) structural units linked together by sharing oxygen atoms. Polyphosphates can adopt linear or a cyclic (also called, ring) structures. In biology, the polyphosphate esters ADP and ATP are involved in energy storage. A variety of polyphosphates find application in mineral sequestration in municipal waters, generally being present at 1 to 5 ppm. GTP, CTP, and UTP are also nucleotides important in the protein synthesis, lipid synthesis, and carbohydrate metabolism, respectively. Polyphosphates are also used as food additives, marked E452.

== Structure ==
Structure of triphosphoric acid

Polyphosphoric acid

Cyclic trimetaphosphate

Adenosine diphosphate (ADP)

The structure of tripolyphosphoric acid illustrates the principles which define the structures of polyphosphates. It consists of three tetrahedral PO_{4} units linked together by sharing oxygen centres. For the linear chains, the end phosphorus groups share one oxide and the others phosphorus centres share two oxide centres. The corresponding phosphates are related to the acids by loss of the acidic protons. In the case of the cyclic trimer each tetrahedron shares two vertices with adjacent tetrahedra.

Sharing of three corners is possible. This motif represents crosslinking of the linear polymer. Crosslinked polyphosphates adopt the sheet-structure Phyllosilicates, but such structures occur only under extreme conditions.

== Formation and synthesis ==
Polyphosphates arise by polymerization of phosphoric acid derivatives. The process begins with two phosphate units coming together in a condensation reaction.

2 H(PO_{4})^{2−} ⇌ (P_{2}O_{7})^{4−} + H_{2}O

The condensation is shown as an equilibrium because the reverse reaction, hydrolysis, is also possible. The process may continue in steps; at each step another (PO_{3})^{−} unit is added to the chain, as indicated by the part in brackets in the illustration of polyphosphoric acid. P_{4}O_{10} can be seen as the end product of condensation reactions, where each tetrahedron shares three corners with the others. Conversely, a complex mix of polymers is produced when a small amount of water is added to phosphorus pentoxide.

== Acid-base and complexation properties ==
Polyphosphates are weak bases. A lone pair of electrons on an oxygen atom can be donated to a hydrogen ion (proton) or a metal ion in a typical Lewis acid-Lewis base interaction. This has profound significance in biology. For instance, adenosine triphosphate is about 25% protonated in aqueous solution at pH 7.

ATP^{4−} + H^{+} ⇌ ATPH^{3−}, pK_{a} $\approx$ 6.6

Further protonation occurs at lower pH values.

== The "high energy" phosphate bond ==
ATP forms chelate complexes with metal ions. The stability constant for the equilibrium

ATP^{4−} + Mg^{2+} ⇌ MgATP^{2−}, log β $\approx$ 4

is particularly large. The formation of the magnesium complex is a critical element in the process of ATP hydrolysis, as it weakens the link between the terminal phosphate group and the rest of the molecule.

The energy released in ATP hydrolysis,

ATP^{4−} + H_{2}O → ADP^{3−} + P_{i}^{−}

at ΔG $\approx$ -36.8 kJ mol^{−1} is large by biological standards. P_{i} stands for inorganic phosphate, which is protonated at biological pH. However, it is not large by inorganic standards. The term "high energy" refers to the fact that it is high relative to the amount of energy released in the organic chemical reactions that can occur in living systems.

== High-polymeric inorganic polyphosphates ==
High molecular weight polyphosphates are well known. One derivative is the glassy (i.e., amorphous) Graham's salt. Crystalline high molecular weight polyphosphates include Kurrol’s salt and Maddrell’s salt (white powder practically insoluble in water). These species have the formula [NaPO_{3}]_{n}[NaPO_{3}(OH)]_{2} where n can be as great as 2000. In terms of their structures, these polymers consist of PO_{3}^{−} "monomers", with the chains are terminated by protonated phosphates.

=== In nature ===
High-polymeric inorganic polyphosphates were found in living organisms by L. Liberman in 1890. These compounds are linear polymers containing a few to several hundred residues of orthophosphate linked by energy-rich phosphoanhydride bonds.

Previously, it was considered either as “molecular fossil” or as only a phosphorus and energy source providing the survival of microorganisms under extreme conditions. These compounds are now known to also have regulatory roles, and to occur in representatives of all kingdoms of living organisms, participating in metabolic correction and control on both genetic and enzymatic levels. Polyphosphate is directly involved in the switching-over of the genetic program characteristic of the exponential growth stage of bacteria to the program of cell survival under stationary conditions, "a life in the slow lane". They participate in many regulatory mechanisms occurring in bacteria:

- They participate in the induction of rpoS, an RNA-polymerase subunit which is responsible for the expression of a large group of genes involved in adjustments to the stationary growth phase and many stressful agents.
- They are important for cell motility, biofilms formation and virulence.
- Polyphosphates and exopolyphosphatases participate in the regulation of the levels of the stringent response factor, guanosine 5'-diphosphate 3'-diphosphate (ppGpp), a second messenger in bacterial cells.
- Polyphosphates participate in the formation of channels across the living cell membranes. The above channels formed by polyphosphate and poly-b-hydroxybutyrate with Ca^{2+} are involved in the transport processes in a variety of organisms.
- An important function of polyphosphate in microorganisms—prokaryotes and the lower eukaryotes—is to handle changing environmental conditions by providing phosphate and energy reserves. Polyphosphates are present in animal cells, and there are many data on its participation in the regulatory processes during development and cellular proliferation and differentiation—especially in bone tissues and brain.

In humans polyphosphates are shown to play a key role in blood coagulation. Produced and released by platelets they activate blood coagulation factor XII which is essential for blood clot formation. Factor XII, also called Hageman factor, initiates fibrin formation and the generation of a proinflammatory mediator, bradykinin, that contributes to leakage from the blood vessels and thrombosis. Bacterial-derived polyphosphates impair the host immune response during infection and targeting polyphosphates with recombinant exopolyphosphatase improves sepsis survival in mice. Inorganic polyphosphates play a crucial role in tolerance of yeast cells to toxic heavy metal cations.

== Use as food additives ==
Sodium polyphosphate (E452(i)), potassium polyphosphate (E452(ii)), sodium calcium polyphosphate (E452(iii)) and calcium polyphosphate (E452(iv)) are used as food additives (emulsifiers, humectants, sequestrants, stabilisers, and thickeners). They are not known to pose any potential health risk other than those generally attributed to other phosphate sources (including those naturally occurring in food). While concerns have been raised regarding detrimental effects on the bones and cardiovascular diseases, as well as hyperphosphatemia, these seem to be relevant only for exaggerated consumption of phosphate sources. In all, reasonable consumption (up to 40 mg phosphate per kg of body weight per day) seems to pose no health risk.

== Use as fire retardants ==
Polyphosphates are widely recognized today as effective fire retardants due to their ability to promote char formation and inhibit flame propagation. When exposed to heat, polyphosphates decompose to form phosphoric acid, which facilitates the creation of a protective char layer on the material’s surface. This barrier reduces heat transfer, limits oxygen access, and suppresses the release of flammable gases, making polyphosphates a key component in modern fire-retardant formulations across various industries, including both polymer composites and wood based products.

== See also ==
- Phosphoric acids
- Sodium trimetaphosphate
- Sodium hexametaphosphate
