= Copper plating =

Copper plating may refer to:

- Copper electroplating, a technique of electroplating a layer of copper onto a metal object
- Electroless copper plating, an auto-catalytic chemical technique used to deposit a layer of copper on a solid workpiece

== See also ==
- Copperplate (disambiguation)
