= Organophosphinic acid =

Class of chemical compounds

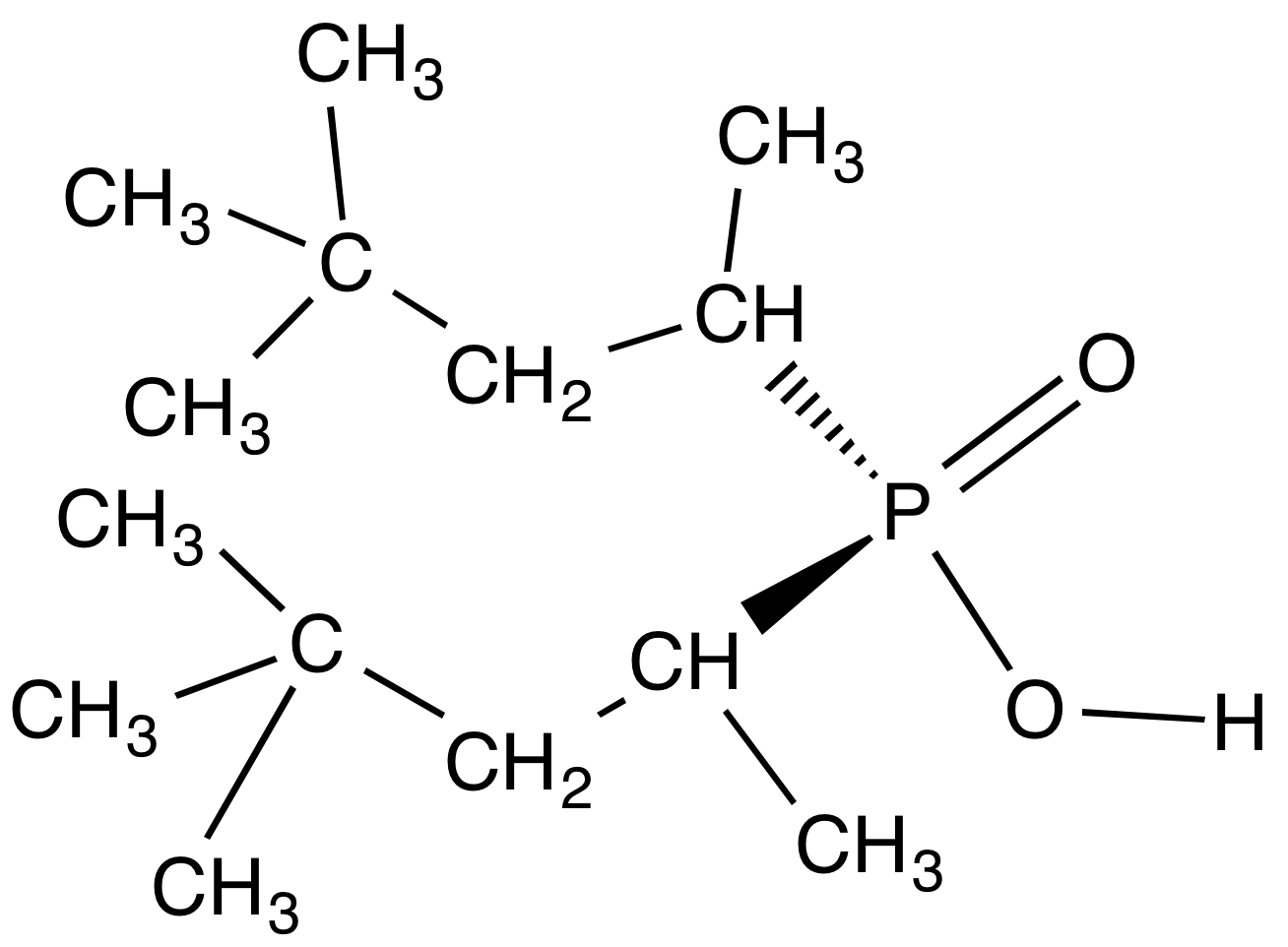
chemical structure of a dialkylphosphinic acid called Cyanex 272.

An organophosphinic acid is an organophosphorus compound with the formula R_{2−n}H_{n}PO_{2}H (R = alkyl, aryl). One or both P-H bonds in the parent hypophosphorous acid (aka phosphinic acid) are replaced by organic groups. The Cyanex family of dialkylphosphinic acids are used in hydrometallurgy to extract metals from ores.

== Monoalkylphosphinic acids ==
Monoalkylphosphinic acids have the formula OP(OH)(H)R, with the simplest example being methylphosphinic acid.

Phosphinic acid adds to Michael acceptors, for example with acrylamide it gives H(HO)P(O)CH_{2}CH_{2}C(O)NH_{2}.

== Dialkylphosphinic acids ==
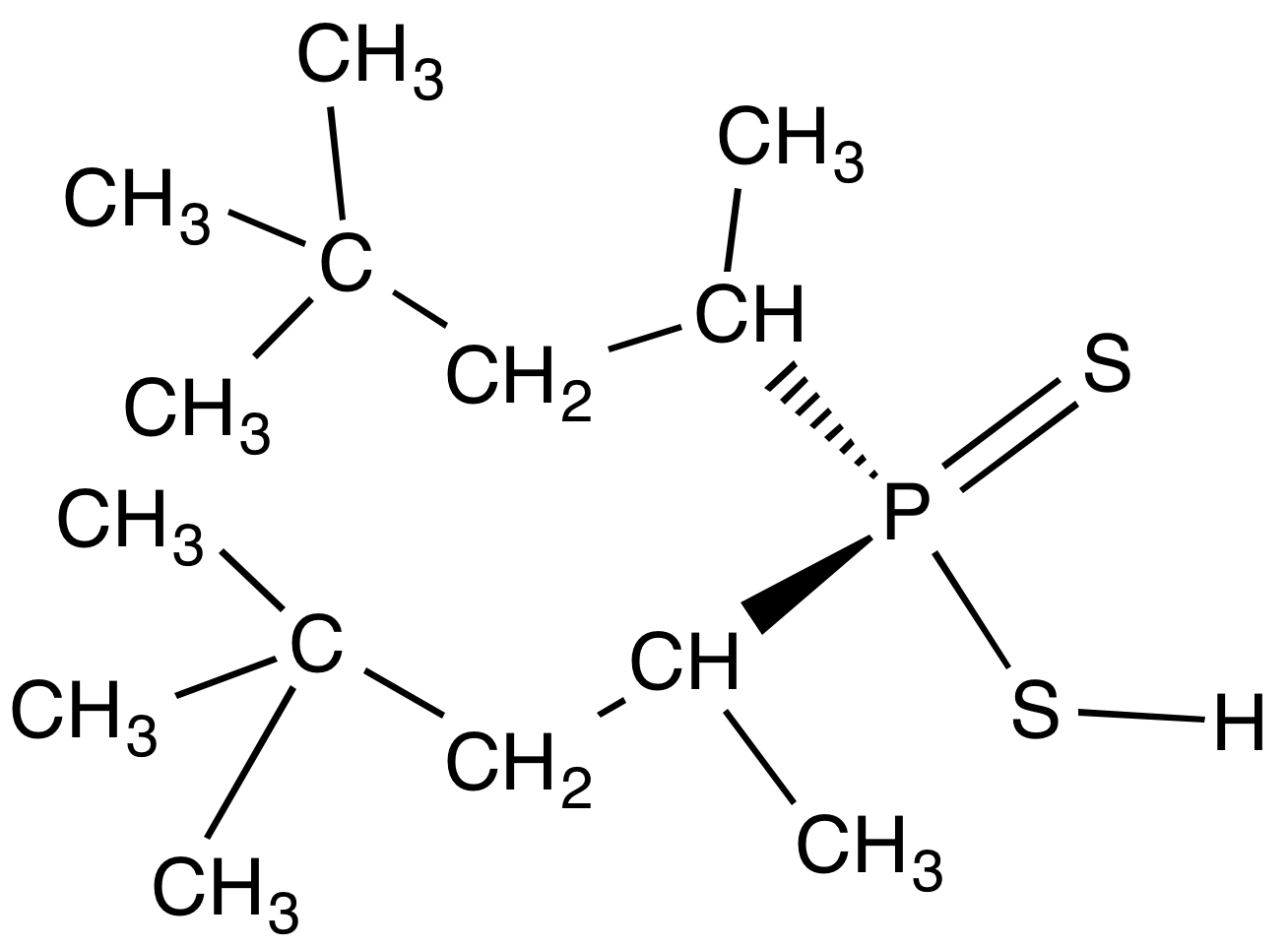
Chemical structure of the dithiophosphinic acid called Cyanex 301

Dialkylphosphinic acids have the formula R_{2}PO_{2}H, where R is an alkyl or aryl group. The phosphorus(V) center has tetrahedral molecular geometry. Under the brand names Aerophine and Cyanex, dialkylphosphinic acids are used in extraction and separation of metals as one of the techniques of hydrometallurgy Characteristically the organic substituents are branched to confer solubility and preclude crystallization.

Formaldehyde and phosphoric acid react to give (HOCH_{2})_{2}PO_{2}H.

== Related compounds ==
The dithiodialkyphosphinic acids (R_{2}PS_{2}H) are related to the diorganodithiophosphates with the formula (RO)_{2}PS_{2}H, which are also used as complexing agents in the purification of metals. The phosphates are more prone to hydrolysis owing to the greater lability of the RO-P linkage vs the direct C-P bond.

== See also ==
- Phosphinate, salts of H_{2}PO_{2}^{−}
