= Electroless nickel-boron plating =

Metal plating process

SEM images of Gen4 NiB surface

Electroless nickel-boron coating (often called NiB coating) is a metal plating process that can create a layer of a nickel-boron alloy on the surface of a solid substrate, like metal or plastic. The process involves dipping the substrate in a water solution containing nickel salt and a boron-containing reducing agent, such as an alkylamineborane or sodium borohydride. It is a type of electroless nickel plating. A similar process, that uses a hypophosphite as a reducing agent, yields a nickel-phosphorus coating instead.

Unlike electroplating, electroless plating processes in general do not require passing an electric current through the bath and the substrate; the reduction of the metal cations in solution to metallic is achieved by purely chemical means, through an autocatalytic reaction. Thus electroless plating creates an even layer of metal regardless of the geometry of the surface – in contrast to electroplating which suffers from uneven current density due to the effect of substrate shape on the electric field at its surface. Moreover, electroless plating can be applied to non-conductive surfaces.

The plating bath usually also contains buffers, complexants, and other control chemicals.

== History ==
Electroless nickel-boron plating developed as a variant of the similar nickel-phosphorus process, discovered accidentally by Charles Adolphe Wurtz in 1844.

In 1969, Harold Edward Bellis from DuPont filed a patent for a general class of electroless plating processes using sodium borohydride, dimethylamine borane, or sodium hypophosphite, in the presence of thallium salts, thus producing a metal-thallium-boron or metal-thallium-phosphorus; where the metal could be either nickel or cobalt. The boron or phosphorus contents was claimed to be variable from 0.1 to 12%, and that of thallium from 0.5 to 6%. The coatings were claimed to be "an intimate dispersion of hard trinickel boride (Ni_{3}B) or nickel phosphide (Ni_{3}P) in a soft matrix of nickel and thallium".

Several versions of the process were patented by Charles Edward McComas in the following years:

- Bellis's formulation was modified by adding stronger chelating agents ("Generation 1"). A method for applying nickel-thallium-boron to titanium without fatiguing the titanium substrate was also developed and commercialized by Purecoat International under the brand "NiBRON".
- In 1986, McComas patented an improved formulation ("Generation 2") for nickel-cobalt-thallium-boron coating, that further increased stability and repeatability of the process. The patent claims that the coating consisted of "hard, amorphous alloy nodules of high nickel content dispersed or rooted in a softer alloy of high cobalt content".
- In 1994 McComas developed another formulation ("Generation 3"), patented in 1998, that allowed consumed chemicals to be replenished during the plating, making it into a continuous process rather than a batch one.
- A further improvement, patented by McComas in 2000 ("Generation 4") used lead tungstate as the stabilizer in place of thallium sulfate, at a pH of 10 to 14. This formulation has been commercialized by UCT Coatings under various brand names, including UltraCem and FailZero.

== Types ==
The earliest variants of electroless nickel-boron plating included thallium salts in the plating bath, and actually created nickel-thallium-boron coatings ("Type 1" in the AMS classification). Eventually formulations were devised that were free from the toxic thallium ingredients, resulting in true nickel-boron ("Type 2") coatings.

== Characteristics ==
As-plated grains of amorphous nickel boron deposit in a columnar structure with the columns being perpendicular to the substrate surface and forming a nodular topography on the surface. Coating will contain 2.5–8% boron by weight.

The nodular structure reduces surface-to-surface contact of two mating/sliding surfaces, thus reducing friction and improving heat dissipation. It is also claimed to reduce drag in both gas and liquid flows.

== Applications ==
Actual and potential applications of electroless nickel-boron coating include saw blades, ship propellers, down-hole crude oil pumping equipment, bushings, thrust washers and paper guide plates.
