= Copper(II) tetrafluoroborate =

Names
- IUPAC name Copper(II) tetrafluoroborate
- Other names Cupric tetrafluoroborate

Identifiers
CAS Number	14735-84-3
3D model (JSmol)	Interactive image
ChemSpider	21241480
ECHA InfoCard	100.049.037
PubChem CID	170058
CompTox Dashboard (EPA)	DTXSID90885722
- InChI: InChI=1S/2BF4.Cu.H2O/c2*2-1(3,4)5;;/h;;;1H2/q2*-1;+2; Key: JYLPBVRGTDBGBM-UHFFFAOYSA-N; InChI=1/2BF4.Cu.H2O/c2*2-1(3,4)5;;/h;;;1H2/q2*-1;+2; Key: JYLPBVRGTDBGBM-UHFFFAOYAF
- SMILES: [Cu+2].F[B-](F)(F)F.F[B-](F)(F)F.O

Properties
Chemical formula	Cu(BF_{4})_{2}
Molar mass	237.155 g/mol
Appearance	blue crystal
Solubility in water	soluble in water

Hazards
- GHS labelling
Pictograms	(GHS05: Corrosive) (GHS07: Exclamation mark)
Signal word	Danger
Hazard statements	H302, H312, H314, H332
Precautionary statements	P260, P264, P270, P271, P280, P301+P317, P301+P330+P331, P302+P352, P302+P361+P354, P304+P340, P305+P354+P338, P316, P317, P321, P330, P362+P364, P363, P405, P501
- NIOSH (US health exposure limits)
PEL (Permissible)	TWA 1 mg/m^{3} (as Cu)
REL (Recommended)	TWA 1 mg/m^{3} (as Cu)
IDLH (Immediate danger)	TWA 100 mg/m^{3} (as Cu)

Related compounds
Other anions	Copper(II) chloride Copper(II) oxide Copper(II) triflate
Other cations	Sodium tetrafluoroborate Lithium tetrafluoroborate Silver tetrafluoroborate
- Except where otherwise noted, data are given for materials in their standard state (at 25 °C [77 °F], 100 kPa). verify (what is ?) Infobox references

Copper(II) tetrafluoroborate or cupric tetrafluoroborate is any inorganic compound with the formula Cu(H_{2}O)_{x}(BF_{4})_{2}. As usually encountered, it is assumed to be the hexahydrate (x = 6), but this salt can be partially dehydrated to the tetrahydrate. Regardless, these compounds are aquo complexes of copper in its +2 oxidation state, with two weakly coordinating tetrafluoroborate anions.

== Applications ==
The compound is used in organic synthesis, e.g. as a Lewis acid for Diels Alder reactions, for cyclopropanation of alkenes with diazo reagents, and as a Lewis acid in Meinwald rearrangement reactions on epoxides. In the former two applications, the copper(II) is reduced to a copper(I) catalyst.

The compound is also used for copper electroplating in fluoroborate-based plating baths.
