= Electroless copper plating =

Chemical process

Electroless copper plating is a chemical process that deposits an even layer of copper on the surface of a solid substrate, like metal or plastic. The process involves dipping the substrate in a water solution containing copper salts and a reducing agent such as formaldehyde.

Unlike electroplating, electroless plating processes in general do not require passing an electric current through the bath and the substrate; the reduction of the metal cations in solution to metallic is achieved by purely chemical means, through an autocatalytic reaction. Thus electroless plating creates an even layer of metal regardless of the geometry of the surface – in contrast to electroplating which suffers from uneven current density due to the effect of substrate shape on the electric field at its surface. Moreover, electroless plating can be applied to non-conductive surfaces.

== Process ==
In a typical formulation of the process, the surfaces to be coated are primed with a palladium catalyst and then immersed in a bath containing copper ions Cu^{2+}, which are reduced by formaldehyde through the overall reactions

2HCHO + 2OH^{−} → 3H_{2} (gas) + 2CO_{2} + 2e^{-}
Cu^{2+} + 2e^{-} → Cu (metal).

While the use of sodium hypophosphite is more common in the electroplating of nickel, due to the fact that cupric ions have been reported to be unable to oxidize hypophosphite, it can be used to deposit copper ions if a nickel salt is added into the solution to facilitate its oxidation. This has been reported in other studies as well.

== Applications ==
Plated PCB via types: (1) through hole, (2) blind via, (3) buried via.

Electroless copper plating is used in the manufacture of printed circuit boards (PCBs), in particular for the conductive layer on the walls of through holes and vias.

== See also ==
- Copper electroplating
- Electroless nickel-phosphorus plating
- Electroless nickel-boron plating (NiB)
- Electroless nickel immersion gold (ENIG,ENEPIG)
