= Methylphosphinic acid =

Names
- Preferred IUPAC name Methylphosphinic acid

Identifiers
CAS Number	4206-94-4
3D model (JSmol)	Interactive image
ChemSpider	10450135
DrugBank	DB02845
ECHA InfoCard	100.021.933
EC Number	224-125-7
PubChem CID	3396560
CompTox Dashboard (EPA)	DTXSID30871063
- InChI: InChI=1S/CH5O2P/c1-4(2)3/h4H,1H3,(H,2,3) Key: BCDIWLCKOCHCIH-UHFFFAOYSA-N
- SMILES: CP(=O)O

Properties
Chemical formula	CH_{5}O_{2}P
Molar mass	80.023 g·mol^{−1}

Related compounds
Related compounds	dimethylphosphinic acid methylphosphonic acid
- Except where otherwise noted, data are given for materials in their standard state (at 25 °C [77 °F], 100 kPa). Infobox references

Methylphosphinic acid is a monobasic acid, the simplest of the phosphinic acids. A central phosphorus atom is connected to a hydroxy group, a hydrogen atom, a methyl group and an oxygen. Derivatives of methylphosphinic acid can have the phosphorus connected hydrogen atom replaced by other organic groups. In early days what is now called methylphosphonic acid was also called methylphosphinic acid.

== Production ==
Methylphosphinic acid can be produced by the hydrolysis of dimethyl methylphosphonate, which is conveniently obtained from trimethylphosphite.

Hydrolysis of methyldichlorophosphine yields methylphosphinic acid,

Methylphosphinic acid is a common byproduct of the hydrolysis of various CH_{3}P-containing esters and amides, as occur in pesticides for example.

== Properties ==
Rat oral LD_{50} value for methylphosphinic acid is 940 mg/kg.

== Derivatives ==
- (1,2,5,6-Tetrahydropyridin-4-yl)methylphosphinic acid TPMPA
- N-methylaminomethane-P-methylphosphinic acid or N-methylamino-methyl-methylphosphinic acid
- Ethane-1,2-diylbis(methylphosphinic acid)
- (3-amino-2-hydroxypropyl)methylphosphinic acid
- Methylphosphinic acid ethyl ester (CAS number 16391-07-4)
- dimethylphosphoryloxy-methylphosphinic acid
- N,N-dimethylaminomethane-P-methylphosphinic acid
- (Aminomethyl)methylphosphinic acid 15901-11-8
- (2-aminobenzyl)-methylphosphinic acid
- (6-amino-3-ethyl-1H-benzimidazol-3-ium-2-yl)-methylphosphinic acid
- [(2S,3S)-3-(methoxymethyl)pentan-2-yl]oxy-methylphosphinic acid
- (3-Aminocyclopentyl)methylphosphinic acid
- methylene-di(methylphosphinic acid)
