= Electroless deposition =

Plating process

Electroless deposition (ED) or electroless plating is a chemical process by which metals and metal alloys are deposited onto a surface. Electroless deposition uses a chemical reaction that causes a metal to precipitate and coat nearby surfaces. The term "electroless" distinguishes this chemical process from electroplating, which uses an external electrical current to deposit metal onto surfaces. Electroless deposition thus can occur on non-conducting surfaces, making it possible to coat diverse materials including plastics, ceramics, and glass, etc. ED produced films can be decorative, anti-corrosive, and conductive. Common applications of ED include films and mirrors containing nickel and/or silver.

Electroless deposition changes the mechanical, magnetic, internal stress, conductivity, and brightening of the substrate. The first industrial application of electroless deposition by the Leonhardt Plating Company has flourished into metallization of plastics, textiles, prevention of corrosion, and jewelry. The microelectronics industry uses ED in the manufacturing of circuit boards, semi-conductive devices, batteries, and sensors.

== Comparison with other methods ==
Electroplating is generally cheaper than ED. Unlike ED, electroplating only deposits on other conductive or semi-conductive materials. Requiring an applied current, the instrumentation for electroplating is more complex. Electroless deposition deposits metals onto 2D and 3D structures, whereas other plating methods such as Physical vapor deposition (PVD), Chemical Vapor Deposition (CVD) are limited to 2D surfaces. Electroless deposition is advantageous in comparison to PVD, CVD, and electroplating deposition methods because it can be performed at ambient conditions. Electroless deposition can also produce very conformal coatings on complex structures like porous membranes.

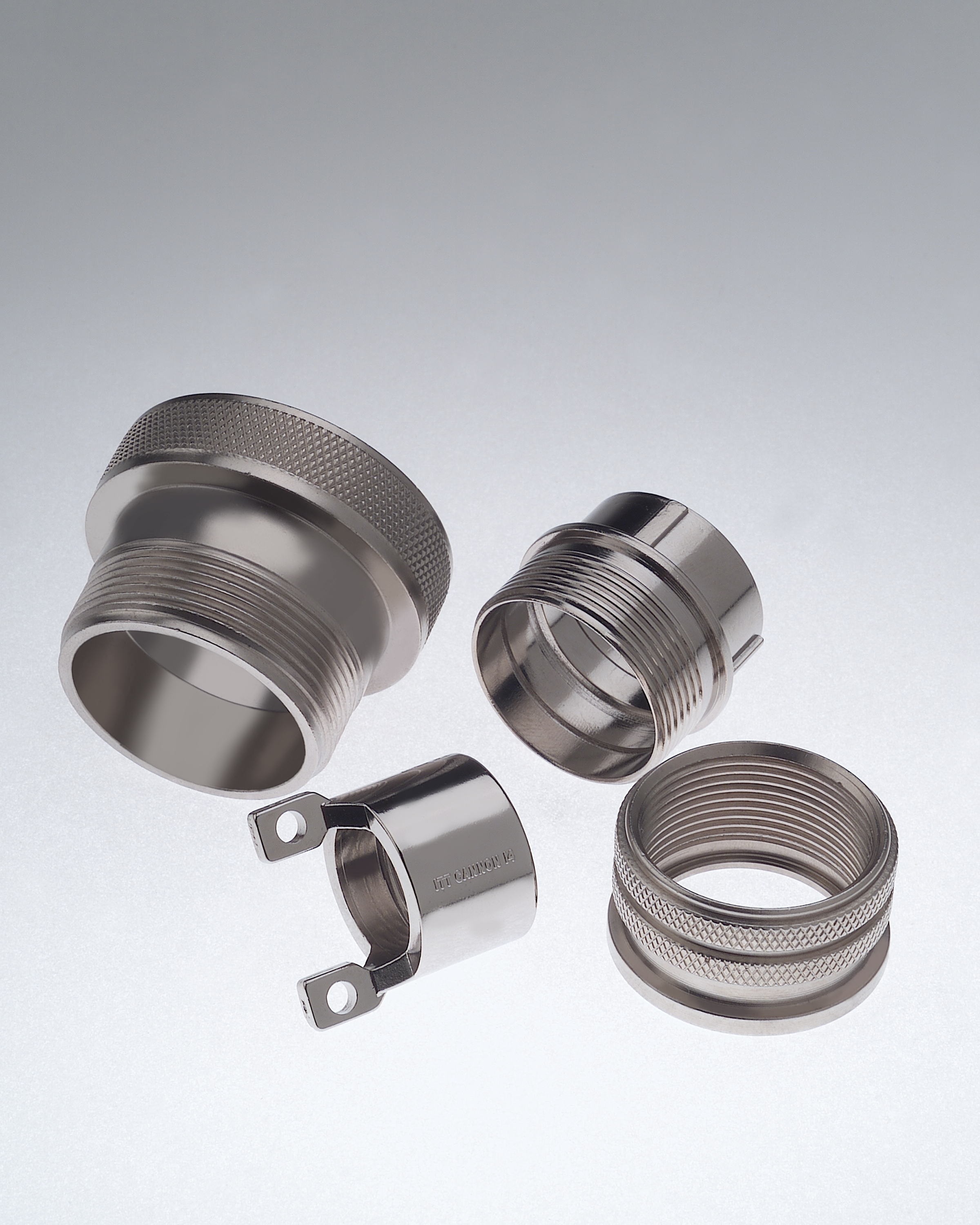
Nickel-plated parts produced by electroless deposition.

== History ==
The earliest known development of electroless plating was by the Moche culture of northern Peru around 100-500 CE. The Moche developed an electrochemical replacement process that deposited thin layers of gold (1-2 microns) onto copper objects without the use of an external electrical current. The process involved dissolving gold into a chemical solution using naturally occurring minerals such as ferric sulfate and alum, then adjusting the pH to prevent excessive corrosion before dipping copper objects into the solution. Gold ions spontaneously deposited onto the copper surface through an auto-catalytic chemical reaction. This technique was used extensively for decorative and ceremonial objects and predated the Western discovery of electroless plating by approximately 1,700 years.

In the Western world, the discovery of electroless deposition is attributed to Charles Wurtz who, in 1846, noticed a nickel-phosphorus solution spontaneously formed a black powder. 70 years later François Auguste Roux rediscovered the electroless deposition process and patented it in United States as the 'Process of producing metallic deposits'. Roux deposited nickel-phosphorus (Ni-P) onto a substrate, using electroless deposition, but his invention went uncommercialized. In 1946 the process was re-discovered by Abner Brenner and Grace E. Riddell while at the U.S. National Bureau of Standards. They presented their discovery at the 1946 Convention of the American Electroplaters' Society (AES); a year later, at the same conference they proposed the term "electroless" for the process and described optimized bath formulations, that resulted in a patent. However, neither Abner nor Riddell benefited financially from the filed patent. Deposition of Ni-P was commerciallized by Leonhardt Plating Company in Cincinnati followed by the Kannigen Co. Ltd in Japan, with revolutionary impact. The Leonhardt company designed and patented several deposition baths including plating of metals such as Pt, Sn, Ag, and their alloys.

The Tollens' reaction is often used in scientific demonstrations of ED. Tollen's reagent deposits a reflective metallic silver layer on glass, and is used for silvering mirrors. This reaction was once used to test for aldehydes in a basic solution of silver nitrate.

== Preparation and bath ==
The ED process can be analyzed as four steps:

1. Pretreatment or functionalization of the substrate cleans the surface of the substrate to remove any contaminants which affects nanoparticle size resulting in poor plating. Pretreatment determines the porosity of the elemental metal deposition, and the initiation site of elemental deposition.
2. Sensitization is an activator ion that can reduce the active metal in the deposition bath giving catalytic sites for the further deposition ("templation").
3. Activation accelerates the deposition by acting as a catalytic seed on the substrate surface for the final electroless deposition bath metal.
4. Electroless deposition is the process by which metal cation is reduced to elemental metal with a powerful reducing agent.

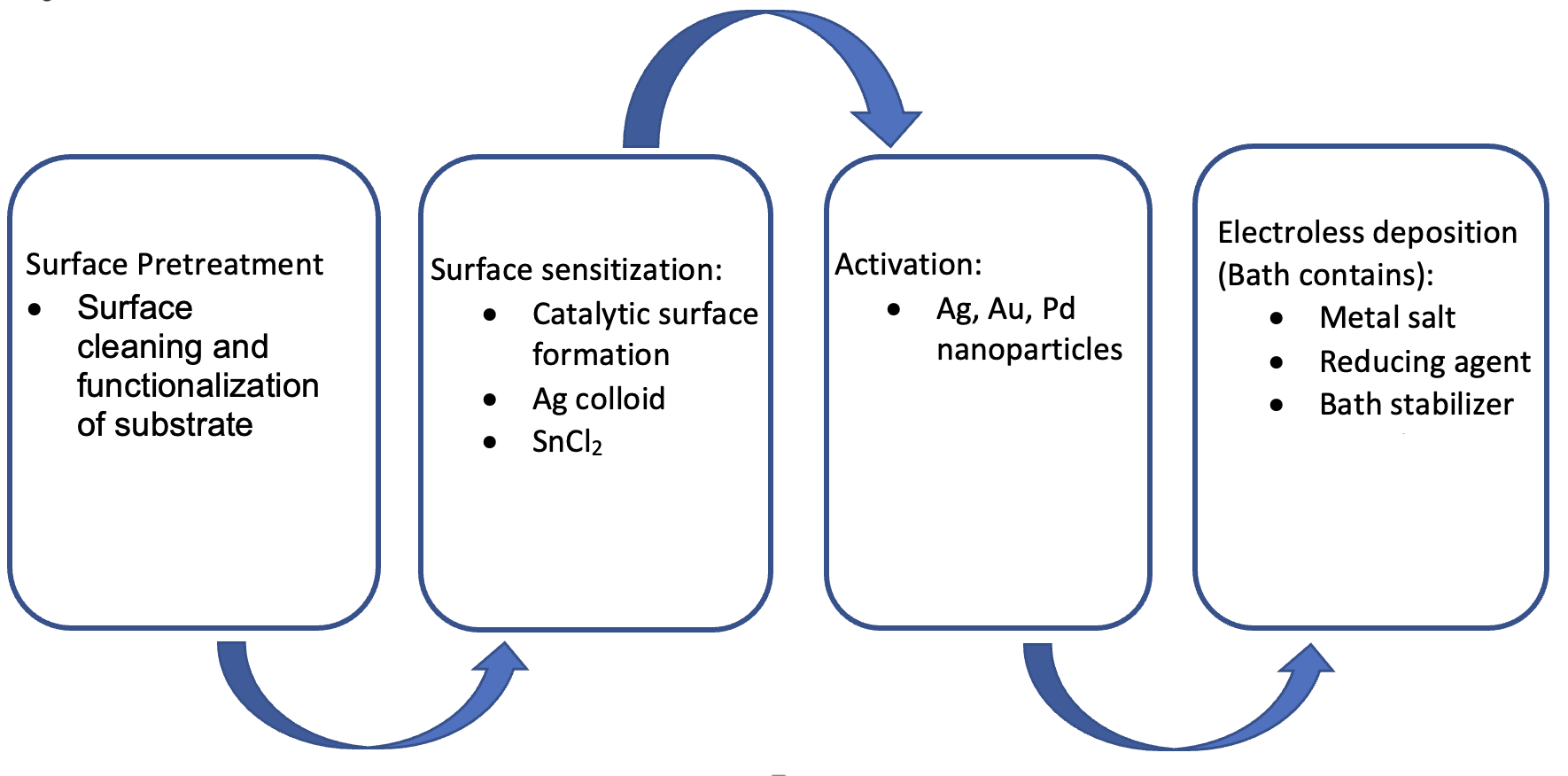
Steps in electroless deposition process

A typical electroless deposition bath consists of many components:

1. A source of metal cation which is provided by a metal salt (e.g.. Cu^{2+} from CuSO_{4} and Ni^{2+} from NiCl_{2}). The metal salts as their hydrate are first dissolved in the bath. Typical concentrations of metal salt are 30 g/L.
2. Reducing agent (or reductant), which donates electrons to the metal cation. Common reducing agents include formaldehyde, sodium borohydride, glucose, sodium hypophosphite, hydrogen peroxide, and ascorbic acid.
3. Other reagents, many in fact, are added to modify the rate of deposition and the nature of the resulting films. Some provide buffering action, others are "stabilizers" to control the rate of deposition. Surfaces are prepared for ED by "sensitization", often with a pretreatment of stannous chloride.

== Process ==
From the perspective of thermodynamics, the process is governed by the Nernst equation: $E=E^0-({0.592}|{2})log(Q)$ E is the potential of the reaction, E^{0} is the standard reduction potential of the redox reaction, and Q is the concentration of the products divided by the concentration of the reactants $[Products/Reactants]$.

The rate of deposition is determined by the kinetics of the autocatalysis, i.e. the efficiency at which the initially deposited islands of metal (or alloy) facilitate the further reduction of the metal salts. In a nickel chloride-sodium hypophosphite bath at 90 °C, the deposition rate is 15 mm/h.

The reducing power of reagents is pH dependent. At pH 0, the E^{0} of formaldehyde is 0.056 V, but at pH=14 the E^{0}=-1.070. The formaldehyde (pH 14) is a more suitable reducing agent than at pH=0 because of the lower negative standard potential which makes it a powerful reducing agent. The potential dependence on pH is described by the Pourbaix Diagram.

=== Deposition mechanisms ===
Several mechanisms for ED have been discussed. In the case of nickel hypophosphorous acid, the following summarizes the net equation:

Ni^{2+} + 2 H_{2}PO^{−}_{2} + 2 H_{2}O → Ni + H_{2} + 2 H_{3}PO_{3}

== Applications ==
=== Mirrors ===
Mirrors for furniture, astronomy, and solar collectors, are produced by silvering using ED. A typical precursor is an ammoniacal solution of silver nitrate as the metal source and glucose or hydrazine as the reducing agent.

=== Catalysts ===
Platinum-based catalysts are widely used in fuel cells for hydrogen production, methanol oxidation, and oxygen reduction. Many catalysts have been produced by ED, e.g. from platinum halides and using hydrazine. Platinum salts even more so than nickel salts are easily reduced in an electrochemical sense, so they are suited for ED.

=== Metallization of plastics by electroless deposition ===
Plastics are typically metallized by nickel-phosphorus, nickel gold, nickel-boron, palladium, copper, and silver. Metallized plastics are used to lower the weight of metal product and minimize the cost associated with the use of precious metals. Electroless nickel plating is used in a variety of industries including aviation, construction, textiles, and oil and gas industries.

=== Electromagnetic interference shielding ===
Electromagnetic interference shielding (EMI shielding) refers to the process by which devices are protected from interference from the electromagnetic radiation. The interference negatively affects the function of the devices; EMI sources include radiowaves, cell phones, and TV receivers. The Federal Aviation Administration and the Federal Communications Commission prohibit the use of cellphones after an airplane is airborne to avoid interference with navigation. Elemental Ni, Cu, and Ni/Cu coating on planes absorb noise signals in the 14 Hz to 1 GHz range.

=== Oil and gas production ===
Elemental nickel coating prevents corrosion of the steel tubulars used for drilling. At the core of this industry nickel coats pressure vessels, compressor blades, reactors, turbine blades, and valves.

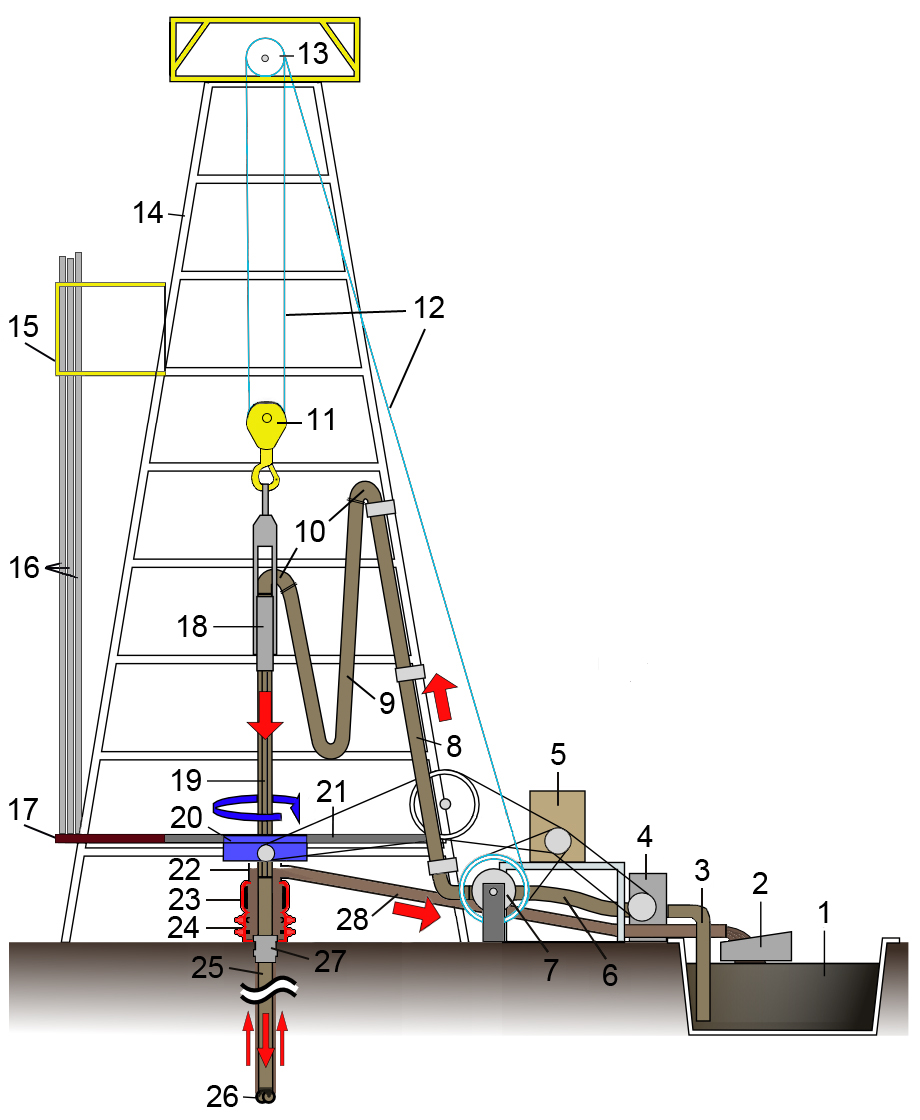
Schematic of oil rig setup. The steel tubulars are covered with elemental Ni which slows the rate of corrosion. Sections 25, 26, and 27 are examples of where an elemental nickel coating would overlay the steel.

== See also ==
- Electroless copper deposition
- Electroless nickel-boron deposititon
- Nanomaterials
- Nanotechnology
