= 3-Mercapto-1-propanesulfonic acid =

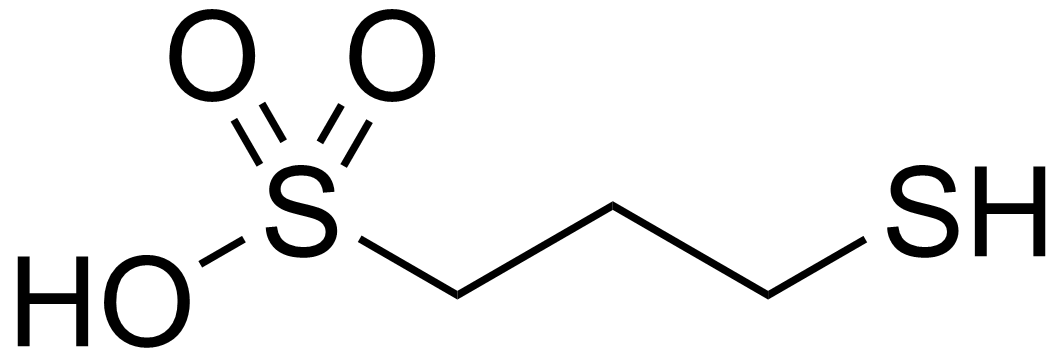
- Skeletal formula

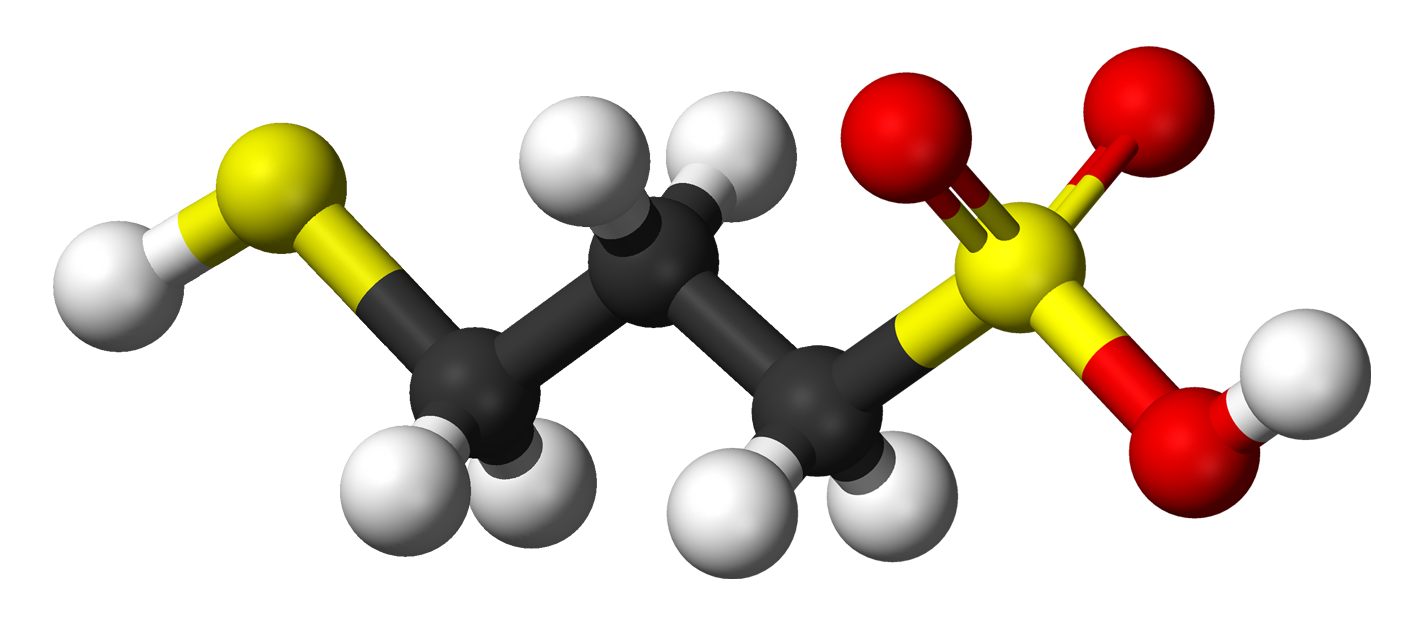
- Ball-and-stick model

Names
- Preferred IUPAC name 3-Sulfanylpropane-1-sulfonic acid
- Other names 3-Mercaptopropane-1-sulfonic acid (no longer recommended); 3-Mercaptopropanesulphonic acid

Identifiers
CAS Number	49594-30-1
3D model (JSmol)	Interactive image
ChemSpider	78667
ECHA InfoCard	100.051.249
PubChem CID	87206
UNII	TYH54NG95Y
CompTox Dashboard (EPA)	DTXSID5068499
- InChI: InChI=1S/C3H8O3S2/c4-8(5,6)3-1-2-7/h7H,1-3H2,(H,4,5,6) Key: OBDVFOBWBHMJDG-UHFFFAOYSA-N; InChI=1/C3H8O3S2/c4-8(5,6)3-1-2-7/h7H,1-3H2,(H,4,5,6) Key: OBDVFOBWBHMJDG-UHFFFAOYAO
- SMILES: O=S(=O)(O)CCCS

Properties
Chemical formula	C_{3}H_{8}O_{3}S_{2}
Molar mass	156.21 g·mol^{−1}
- Except where otherwise noted, data are given for materials in their standard state (at 25 °C [77 °F], 100 kPa). verify (what is ?) Infobox references

3-Mercapto-1-propanesulfonic acid is a chemical compound often used as a brightener in copper electroplating.
