= Electroless nickel-phosphorus plating =

Chemical-induced nickel coating of a surface

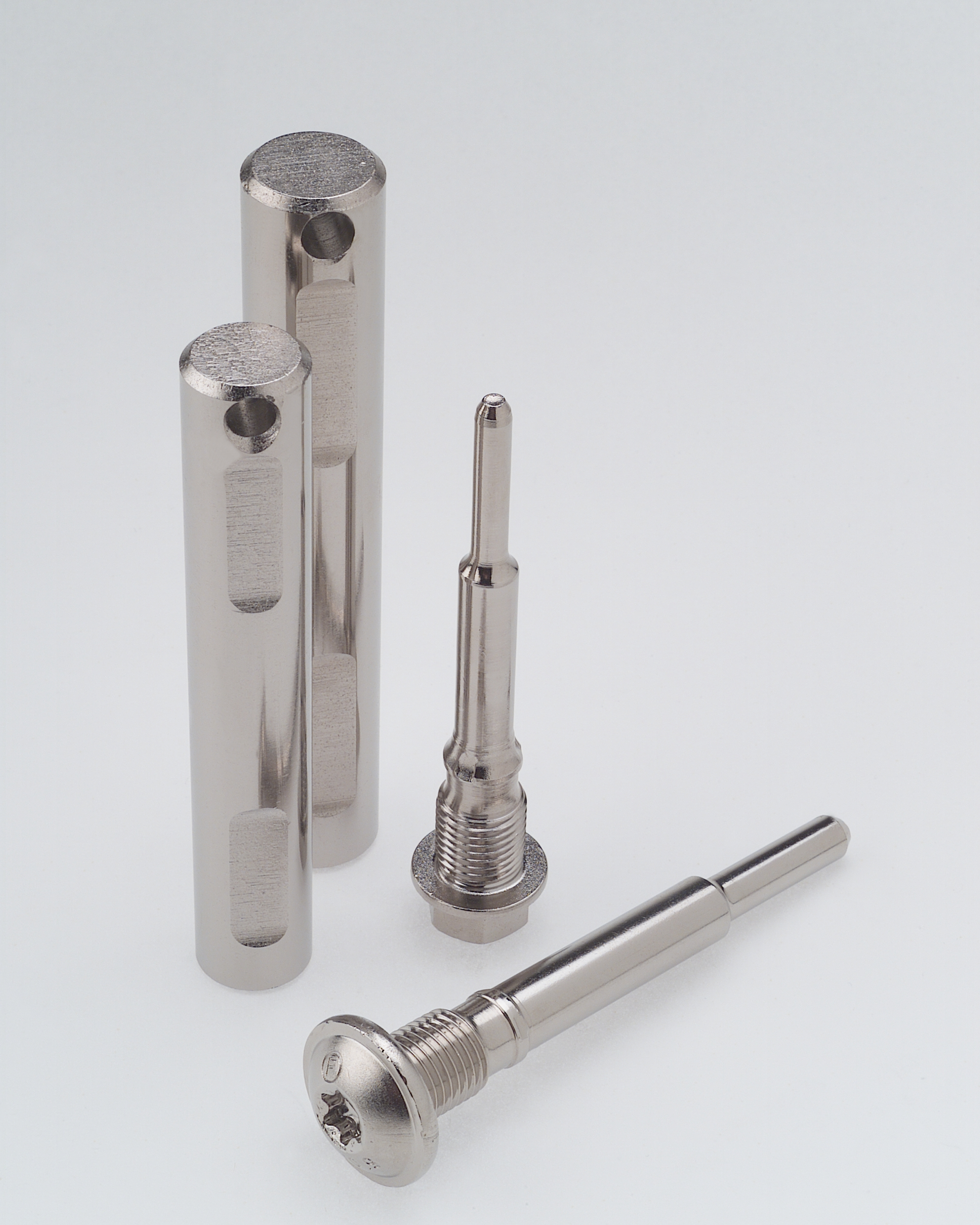
Machine parts with electroless nickel plating.

Electroless nickel-phosphorus plating, also referred to as E-nickel, is a chemical process that deposits an even layer of nickel-phosphorus alloy on the surface of a solid substrate, like metal or plastic. The process involves dipping the substrate in a water solution containing nickel salt and a phosphorus-containing reducing agent, usually a hypophosphite salt. It is the most common version of electroless nickel plating (EN plating) and is often referred by that name. A similar process uses a borohydride reducing agent, yielding a nickel-boron coating instead.

Unlike electroplating, processes in general do not require passing an electric current through the bath and the substrate; the reduction of the metal cations in solution to metallic is achieved by purely chemical means, through an autocatalytic reaction. This creates an even layer of metal regardless of the geometry of the surface – in contrast to electroplating which suffers from uneven current density due to the effect of substrate shape on the electric resistance of the bath and therefore on the current distribution within it. Moreover, it can be applied to non-conductive surfaces.

It has many industrial applications, from merely decorative to the prevention of corrosion and wear. It can be used to apply composite coatings, by suspending suitable powders in the bath.

== Historical overview ==
The reduction of nickel salts to nickel metal by hypophosphite was accidentally discovered by Charles Adolphe Wurtz in 1844. In 1911, François Auguste Roux of L'Aluminium Français patented the process (using both hypophosphite and orthophosphite) for general metal plating.

However, Roux's invention does not seem to have received much commercial use. In 1946 the process was accidentally rediscovered by Abner Brenner and Grace E. Riddell of the National Bureau of Standards. They tried adding various reducing agents to an electroplating bath in order to prevent undesirable oxidation reactions at the anode. When they added sodium hypophosphite, they observed that the amount of nickel that was deposited at the cathode exceeded the theoretical limit of Faraday's law.

Brenner and Riddel presented their discovery at the 1946 Convention of the American Electroplaters' Society (AES); a year later, at the same conference they proposed the term "electroless" for the process and described optimized bath formulations, that resulted in a patent.

A declassified US Army technical report in 1963 credits the discovery to Wurtz and Roux more than to Brenner and Riddell.

During 1954–1959, a team led by Gregorie Gutzeit at General American Transportation Corporation greatly developed the process, determining the optimum parameters and concentrations of the bath, and introducing many important additives to speed up the deposition rate and prevent unwanted reactions, such as spontaneous deposition. They also studied the chemistry of the process.

In 1969, Harold Edward Bellis from DuPont filed a patent for a general class of processes using sodium borohydride, dimethylamine borane, or sodium hypophosphite, in the presence of thallium salts, thus producing a metal-thallium-boron or metal-thallium-phosphorus; where the metal could be either nickel or cobalt. The boron or phosphorus contents was claimed to be variable from 0.1 to 12%, and that of thallium from 0.5 to 6%. The coatings were claimed to be "an intimate dispersion of hard trinickel boride (Ni_{3}B) or nickel phosphide (Ni_{3}P) in a soft matrix of nickel and thallium".

== Procedure ==
=== Surface cleaning ===
Before plating, the surface of the material must be thoroughly cleaned. Unwanted solids left on the surface cause poor plating. Cleaning is usually achieved by a series of chemical baths, including non-polar solvents to remove oils and greases, as well as acids and alkalis to remove oxides, insoluble organics, and other surface contaminants. After applying each bath, the surface must be thoroughly rinsed with water to remove any residue of the cleaning chemicals.

Internal stresses in the substrate created by machining or welding can affect the plating.

=== Plating bath ===
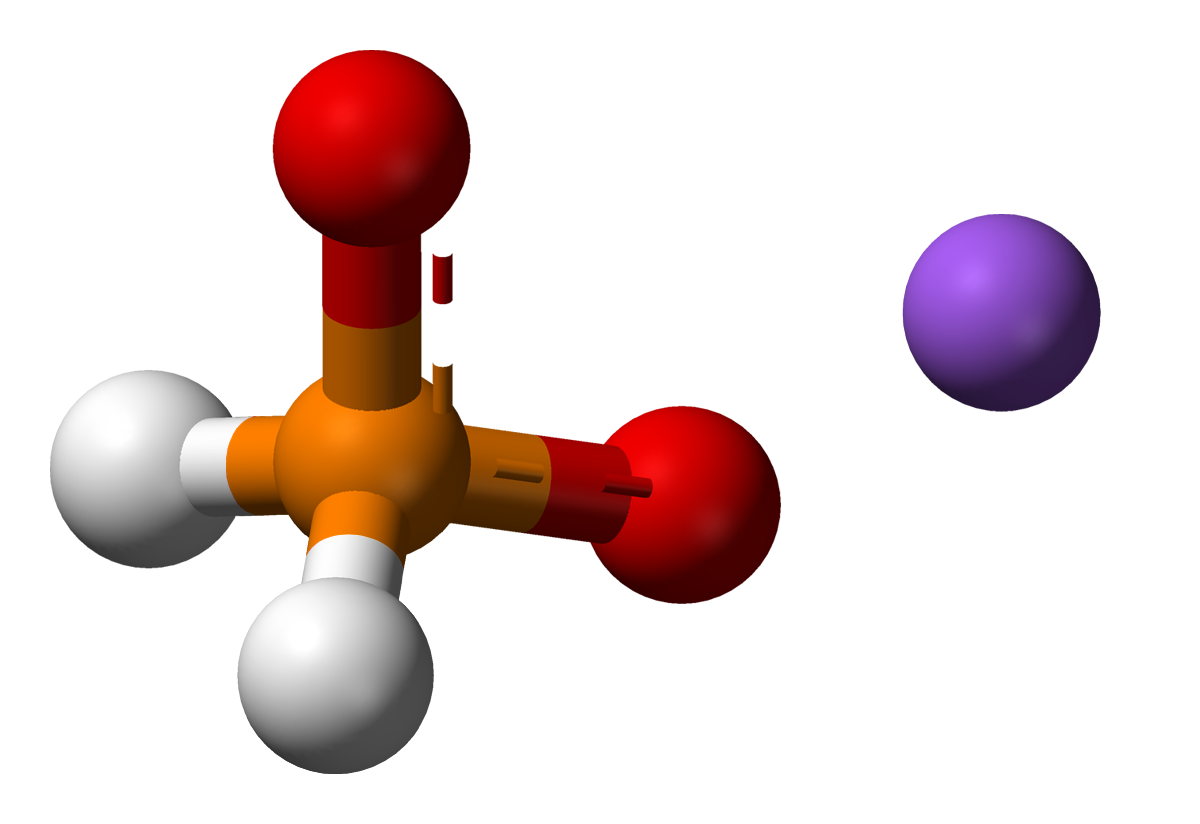
Molecular model of sodium hypophosphite, the usual reducing agent in electroless nickel-phosphorus plating.

The main ingredients of an electroless nickel plating bath are source of nickel cations Ni^{2+}, usually nickel sulfate and a suitable reducing agent, such as hypophosphite H_{2}PO^{−}_{2} or borohydride BH^{−}_{4}. With hypophosphite, the main reaction that produces the nickel plating yields orthophosphite H_{2}PO^{−}_{3}, elemental phosphorus, protons H^{+} and molecular hydrogen H_{2}:

2Ni^{2+} + 8H_{2}PO^{−}_{2} + 2H_{2}O → 2Ni_{0} (s) + 6H_{2}PO^{−}_{3} + 2H^{+} + 2P (s) + 3H_{2} (g)

This reaction is catalyzed by some metals including cobalt, palladium, rhodium, and nickel itself. Because of the latter, the reaction is auto-catalytic, and proceeds spontaneously once an initial layer of nickel has formed on the surface.

The plating bath also often includes:

- complexing agents, such as carboxylic acids or amines to increase phosphate solubility and to prevent the white-out phenomena by slowing the reaction.
- stabilizers, such as lead salts, sulfur compounds, or various organic compounds, to slow the reduction by co-depositing with the nickel.
- buffers, to maintain the acidity of the bath. Many complexing agents act as buffers.
- brighteners, such as cadmium salts or certain organic compounds, to improve the surface finish. They are mostly co-deposited with nickel (like the stabilizers).
- surfactants, to keep the deposited layer hydrophilic in order to reduce pitting and staining.
- accelerators, such as certain sulfur compounds, to counteract the reduction of plating rate caused by complexing agents. They are usually co-deposited and may cause discoloration.

=== Surface activation ===
Because of the autocatalytic character of the reaction, the surface to be plated must be activated by making it hydrophilic, then ensuring that it consists of a metal with catalytic activity. If the substrate is not made of one of those metals, then a thin layer of one of them must be deposited first, by some other process.

If the substrate is a metal that is more electropositive than nickel, such as iron and aluminum, an initial nickel film will be created spontaneously by a redox reaction with the bath, such as:

Fe_{0} (s) + Ni^{2+} (aq) → Ni_{0} (s) + Fe^{2+} (aq)
2Al_{0} (s) + 3Ni^{2+} (aq) → 3Ni_{0} (s) + 2Al^{3+} (aq)

For metals that are less electropositive than nickel, such as copper, the initial nickel layer can be created by immersing a piece of a more electropositive metal, such as zinc, electrically connected to the substrate, thus creating a shorted Galvanic cell.

On substrates that are not metallic but are electrically conductive, such as graphite, the initial layer can be created by briefly running an electric current through it and the bath, as in electroplating. If the substrate is not conductive, such as ABS and other plastics, one can use an activating bath containing a noble metal salt, like palladium chloride or silver nitrate, and a suitable reducing agent.

Activation is done with a weak acid etch, nickel strike, or a proprietary solution, if the substrate is non-metallic.

=== After-plating treatment ===
After plating, an anti-oxidation or anti-tarnish chemical coating, such as phosphate or chromate, is applied, followed by rinsing with water and dried to prevent staining. Baking may be necessary to improve the hardness and adhesion of the plating, anneal any internal stresses, and expel trapped hydrogen that may make it brittle.

=== Variants ===
The processes for electroless nickel-phosphorus plating can be modified by substituting cobalt for nickel, wholly or partially, with relatively little changes. Other nickel-phosphorus alloys can be created with suitable baths, such as nickel-zinc-phosphorus.

=== Composites by codeposition ===
Electroless nickel-phosphorus plating can produce composite materials consisting of minute solid particles embedded in the nickel-phosphorus coat. The general procedure is to suspend the particles in the plating bath, so that the growing metal layer will surround and cover them. This procedure was initially developed by Odekerken in 1966 for electrodeposited nickel-chromium coatings. In that study, in an intermediate layer, finely powdered particles, like aluminum oxide and polyvinyl chloride (PVC) resin, were distributed within a metallic matrix. By changing the baths, the procedure can create coatings with multiple layers of different composition.

The first commercial application of their work was electroless nickel-silicon carbide coatings on the Wankel internal combustion engine. Another commercial composite in 1981 incorporated polytetrafluoroethylene (nickel-phosphorus PTFE). However, the co-deposition of diamond and PTFE particles was more difficult than that of aluminum oxide or silicon carbide. The feasibility to incorporate the second phase of fine particles, the size of a nanometer to micrometer, within a metal-alloy matrix has initiated a new generation of composite coatings.

== Characteristics ==
=== Advantages and disadvantages ===
Compared to the electrolytic process, a major advantage of electroless nickel plating is that it creates an even coating of a desired thickness and volume, even in parts with complex shape, recesses, and blind holes. Because of this property, it may often be the only option.

Another major advantage of EN plating is that it does not require electrical power, electrical apparatuses, or sophisticated jigs and racks.

If properly formulated, EN plating may also provide a less porous coating, harder and more resistant to corrosion and hydrogen absorption.

Electroless nickel plating also can produce coatings that are free of built-in mechanical stress, or even have compressive stress.

A disadvantage is the higher cost of the chemicals, which are consumed in proportion to the mass of nickel deposited; whereas in electroplating the nickel ions are replenished by the metallic nickel anode. Automatic mechanisms may be needed to replenish those reagents during plating.

The specific characteristics vary depending on the type of EN plating and nickel alloy used, which are chosen to suit the application.

=== Types ===
The metallurgical properties of the alloy depend on the percentage of phosphorus.

- Low-phosphorus coatings have up to 4% P contents. Their hardness reaches up to 60 on the Rockwell C scale.
- Medium-phosphorus coatings, the most common type, are defined as those with 4 to 10% P, although the range depends on the application: up to 4–7% for decorative applications, 6–9% for industrial applications, and 4–10% for electronics.
- High-phosphorus coatings have 10–14% P. They are preferred for parts that will be exposed to highly corrosive acidic environments such as oil drilling and coal mining. Their hardness may score up to 600 on Vickers test. Note that the Vickers hardness is not easily comparable to the Rockwell scale.

=== Surface finish ===
Electroless nickel plating can have a matte, semi-bright, or bright finish.

=== Structure ===
Electroless nickel-phosphorus coatings with less than 7% phosphorus are solid solutions with a microcrystalline structure, with each grain 2–6 nm across. Coatings with more than 10% phosphorus are amorphous. Between these two limits, the coating is a mixture of amorphous and microcrystalline materials.

=== Physical properties ===
The melting point of the nickel-phosphorus alloy deposited by the EN process is significantly lower than that of pure nickel (1445 °C), and decreases as the phosphorus content increases, down to 890 °C at about 14% P.

The magnetic properties of the coatings decrease with increasing phosphorus contents. Coatings with more than 11.2% P are non-magnetic.

Solderability of low-phosphorus coatings is good, but decreases with increasing P contents.

Porosity decreases as the phosphorus contents increases, while hardness, wear resistance, and resistance to corrosion increase.

== Applications ==
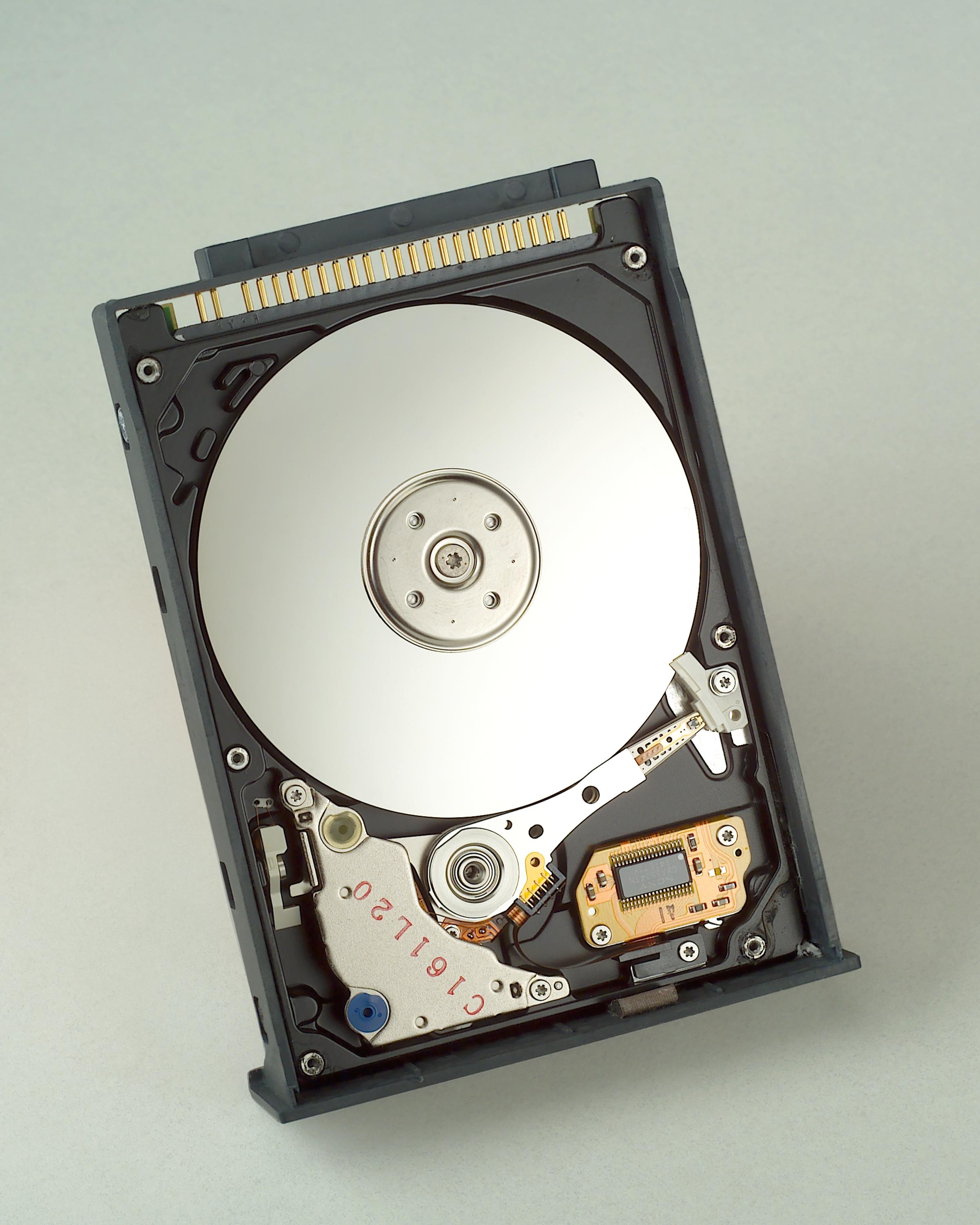
Electroless nickel coating is often used to smooth the platters of hard disk drives.

Electroless nickel-phosphorus is used when wear resistance, hardness and corrosion protection are required. Applications include oilfield valves, rotors, drive shafts, paper handling equipment, fuel rails, optical surfaces for diamond turning, door knobs, kitchen utensils, bathroom fixtures, electrical/mechanical tools and office equipment.

Due to the high hardness of the coating, it can be used to salvage worn parts. Coatings of 25 to 100 micrometers can be applied and machined back to the final dimensions. Its uniform deposition profile means it can be applied to complex components not readily suited to other hard-wearing coatings like hard chromium.

It is also used extensively in the manufacture of hard disk drives, as a way of providing an atomically smooth coating to the aluminium disks. The magnetic layers are then deposited on top of this film, usually by sputtering and finishing with protective carbon and lubrication layers.

Its use in the automotive industry for wear resistance has increased significantly. However, it is important to recognize that only End of Life Vehicles Directive or RoHS compliant process types (free from heavy metal stabilizers) may be used for these applications.

=== Printed circuit boards ===
Electroless nickel plating, covered by a thin layer of gold, is used in the manufacture of printed circuit boards (PCBs), to avoid oxidation and improving the solderability of copper contacts and plated through holes and vias. The gold is typically applied by quick immersion in a solution containing gold salts. This process is known in the industry as electroless nickel immersion gold (ENIG). A variant of this process adds a thin layer of electroless palladium over the nickel, a process known by the acronym ENEPIG.

== Standards ==
- AMS-C-26074
- AMS-2404
- ASTM B-733
- ASTM-B-656 (inactive)
- Mil-C-26074E
- MIL-DTL-32119
- IPC-4552 (for ENIG)
- IPC-7095 (for ENIG)

== See also ==
- Nickel electroplating
- Nucleation
- Organic Solderability Preservative (OSP)
- Electroless nickel-boron plating
- Electroless copper plating
