= Copperplate =

Copperplate (or copper-plate, copper plate) may refer to:

- Any form of intaglio printing using a metal plate (usually copper), or the plate itself
  - Engraving
  - Etching
- Copperplate script, a style of handwriting and typefaces derived from it
- Copperplate Gothic, a glyphic typeface designed by Frederic Goudy in 1901
- Indian copper plate inscriptions, ancient Indian records of royal lineages, land grants etc.
- A plate made of copper

== See also ==
- Copper plating (disambiguation)
- Old master print
- Printmaking
