= Phosphinate =

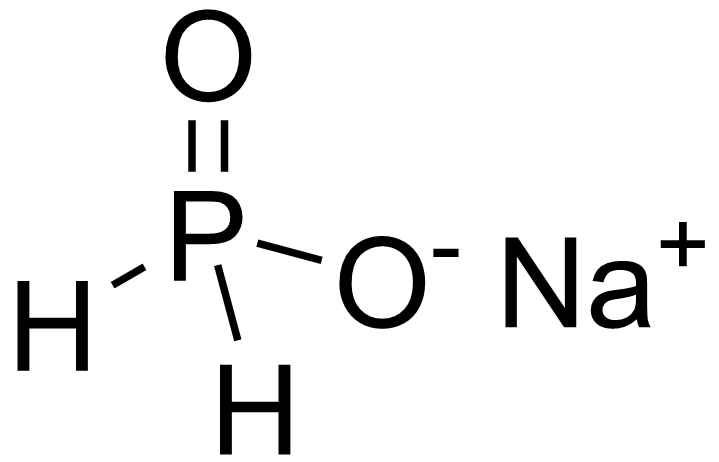
- Sodium hypophosphite

Names
- Other names dihydrogenphosphate(I); hypophosphite

Identifiers
| CAS Number | 15460-68-1 |
| 3D model (JSmol) | Interactive image |
| ChemSpider | 10449927 |
| PubChem CID | 4413076 |
| UNII | 238U65NZ04 |
- InChI: InChI=1S/H3O2P/c1-3-2/h3H2,(H,1,2)/p-1 Key: ACVYVLVWPXVTIT-UHFFFAOYSA-M
- SMILES: [O-][PH2]=O

Properties
| Chemical formula | H_{2}O_{2}P^{−} |
| Molar mass | 64.988 g·mol^{−1} |

Related compounds
| Related compounds | phosphite; phosphine oxide |
- Except where otherwise noted, data are given for materials in their standard state (at 25 °C [77 °F], 100 kPa). Infobox references

Phosphinates or hypophosphites are a class of phosphorus compounds conceptually based on the structure of hypophosphorous acid. IUPAC prefers the term phosphinate in all cases, however in practice hypophosphite is usually used to describe inorganic species (e.g. sodium hypophosphite), while phosphinate typically refers to organophosphinic acid salts.

== Hypophosphites ==
The hypophosphite ion is (H_{2}PO_{2})^{−}. The salts are prepared by heating white phosphorus in warm aqueous alkali e.g. Ca(OH)_{2}:

P_{4} + 2 Ca(OH)_{2} + 4 H_{2}O → 2 Ca(H_{2}PO_{2})_{2} + 2 H_{2}

Hypophosphites are reducing agents:

(H_{2}PO_{2})^{−} + 3 OH^{−} → (HPO_{3})^{2−} + 2 H_{2}O + 2 e^{−}

Hypophosphites are used in electroless nickel plating as the reducing agent to deposit for example Ni metal from Ni salts. The hypophosphite ion is thermodynamically unstable, and disproportionates on heating to phosphine and phosphate salts:

2 H_{2}PO_{2}^{−} → PH_{3} + HPO_{4}^{2−}

== Reactions ==
When heated, sodium hypophosphite disproportionates to PH_{3}, Na_{2}H_{2}P_{2}O_{5}, Na_{2}HPO_{3}, Na_{4}P_{2}O_{7} and H_{2}.

When exposed to light ammonium hypophosphite darkens. A proposed reaction is:

[H_{2}PO_{2}]^{−} → H^{•} + [HP^{•}O_{2}]^{−}
[HP•O_{2}]^{−} + [H_{2}PO_{2}]^{−} → H^{•} + [O_{2}P^{•}PHO_{2}]^{2−}

== Uses ==
Hypophosphite (usually sodium hypophosphite) acts as a reducing agent to deposit nickel onto surfaces without using electricity. Common in electronics, automotive, and aerospace industries for corrosion resistance and hardness. Some hypophosphite compounds are used in medicines, particularly as sources of phosphorus or as stabilizers in formulations.

In polymer and plastic stabilization, they are used today as antioxidants and thermal stabilizers to prevent degradation during the processing of plastics like PVC. Beyond nickel plating, hypophosphites are used in general chemical synthesis where a mild reducing agent is needed.

Additionally, in wood science, sodium hypophosphite in combination with other agents, such as ammonium-, nitrogen- or aluminium-containing chemicals, has been used for in solid wood and particleboard to improve the fire retarding properties.

== List ==
| name | formula | system | space group | unit cell | volume | density | comment | ref |
|---|---|---|---|---|---|---|---|---|
| lithium dihydrogenphosphate | LiH_{2}PO_{2} | monoclinic | C2/c | a = 9.356 b = 5.3107 c = 6.543 β = 108.26° Z=4 | 308.73 | 1.547 | | |
| beryllium bis(dihydrogenphosphate) | Be(H_{2}PO_{2})_{2} | tetragonal | P4_{1}2_{1}2 | a = 5.0117 c = 20.051 Z=4 | 503.62 | 1.833 | band gap 7.84 eV | |
| ammonium hypophosphite | (NH_{4})H_{2}PO_{2} | orthorhombic | Cmma | a = 7.5425 b = 11.5204 c = 3.9942 Z = 4 | 347.07 | 1.589 | | |
| Hydrazinium(2+) phosphinate | (N_{2}H_{6})(H_{2}PO_{2})_{2} | monoclinic | P2_{1}/c | a = 7.74 b = 6.44 c = 6.77 β = 98.1° | | | | |
| 1,3-diaminoguanidinium(1+) hypophosphite | (CN_{5}H_{8})H_{2}PO_{2} | monoclinic | P2_{1}/c ?P2_{1}/m | a=6.3673 b=14.5302 c=66452 β=16742° | | | | |
| triethylammonium hypophosphite hydrate | (Et_{3}NH)(H_{2}PO_{2})·H_{2}O | | | | | | | |
| | NaH_{2}PO_{2•}0.8H2O | monoclinic | P2_{1}/n | a=11.127 b=13.572 c=12.93 β=102.98° Z=20 | | | | |
| | Mg(H_{2}PO_{2})_{2} | | | | | | | |
| | Mg(PO_{2}H_{2})_{2}.6H_{2}O | tetragonal | I4_{1}/acd | a=10.33 c=20.38 Z=8 | | 1.60 | | |
| hexaaquamagnesium(II) bis(hypophosphite) | [Mg(H_{2}O)_{6}](H_{2}PO_{2})_{2} | tetragonal | P4_{2}/nmc | a=7.2187 c=10.4639 Z=2 | 542.27 | 1.598 | | |
| | Al(H_{2}PO_{2})_{3} | | | | | | | |
| Potassium hypophosphite | KH_{2}PO_{2} | monoclinic | C2/c | a = 7.313 b = 7.2952 c = 7.181 β = 116.20° Z = 4 | 343.75 | | | |
| calcium hypophosphite | Ca(H_{2}PO_{2})_{2} | | | | | | | |
| calcium sodium hypophosphite | NaCa(H_{2}PO_{2})_{2} | cubic | P2_{1}3 | a = 9.720 | 918.3 | 1.90 | | |
| | Ti(H_{2}PO_{2})_{3} | trigonal | R3c | a=11.7484 c=9.7368 Z=6 | 1163.9 | 2.079 | blue | |
| vanadium(III) hypophosphite | V(H_{2}PO_{2})_{3} | monoclinic | P2_{1}/n | a = 11.4985 b = 11.7771 c = 11.5999 β = 99.807° | 1547.89 | 2.11 | green | |
| | VO(H_{2}PO_{2})·H_{2}O | monoclinic | C2/c | a = 12.046 b = 8.147 c = 7.548 β = 121.83° | | | blue | |
| manganese hypophosphite monohydrate | Mn(H_{2}PO_{2})_{2}.H_{2}O | monoclinic | P2_{1}/c | a = 7.8601 b = 7.4411 c = 10.7717 β = 102.859° Z=4 | | | | |
| manganese hypophosphite monohydrate | β-Mn(H_{2}PO_{2})_{2}.H_{2}O | monoclinic | P2_{1}/n | 12.013 b=8.100 c=12.450 β=106.28° Z=8 | | | | |
| (μ_{3}-Hypophosphito)-(μ_{2}-hypophosphito)-manganese dimethylformamide solvate | [Mn(H_{2}PO_{2})_{2}]_{n}·(DMF)_{0.11} | hexagonal | R3̅ | a=20.53 c=8.041 | | | | |
| | [NH_{4}][Mn^{II}(H_{2}PO_{2})_{3}(H_{2}O)] | monoclinic | P2_{1}/n | a=7.4412 b=15.147 c=9.3051 β=108.230° | | | | |
| guanidinium manganese hypophosphite | CN_{3}H_{6} Mn(H_{2}POO)_{3} | monoclinic | I2/m | a=8.7596 b=13.2087 c=9.6956 β=89.764° | | | | |
| guanidinium manganese hypophosphite | CN_{3}H_{6} Mn(H_{2}POO)_{3} | triclinic | P1̅ | a=9.0994 b=9.2419 c=15.8369 α=105.294° β=90.971° γ=118.618° | | | | |
| formamidinium manganese hypophosphite | CN_{2}H_{5}Mn(H_{2}POO)_{3} | monoclinic | C2/c | a=13.4506 b=10.2196 c=7.5274 β=103.604° | | | | |
| imidazolium manganese hypophosphite | C_{3}H_{52}Mn(H_{2}POO)_{3} | monoclinic | P2_{1}/c | a=9.6520 b=12.7066 c=18.4643 β=91.5450° | | | | |
| triazolium manganese hypophosphite | C_{2}H_{4}N_{3}Mn(H_{2}POO)_{3} | monoclinic | P2_{1}/c | a=9.8034 b=8.5924 c=13.3120 β=98.554° | | | | |
| dabcon-diium dimanganese hexakis(hypophosphite) | C_{6}H_{1}_{4}N_{2}Mn_{2}(H_{2}POO)_{6} | hexagonal | R3̅ | a=9.8860 c=41.171 | | | | |
| dabcon-diium dimanganese hexakis(hypophosphite) | C_{6}H_{1}_{4}N_{2}Mn_{2}(H_{2}POO)_{6} | triclinic | P1̅ | a=9.8364( b=14.9329 c=16.8019 α=66.631° β=89.585° γ=89.082° | | | | |
| bis(μ_{2}-Phosphinato)-bis(5,10,15,20-tetraphenylporphyrinato)-di-manganese ethanol solvate monohydrate | | monoclinic | P2_{1}/n | a=13.2131 b=25.263 c=23.477 β=95.31° | | | | |
| Bis(phosphinato)(2,2'-bipyridyl)manganese(II) | C_{10}H_{12}N_{2}Mn(H_{2}PO_{2})_{2} | monoclinic | C2/c | a=16.827 b=10.745 c=7.170 β=91.46° X=4 | | 1.75 | yellow | |
| iron(III) hypophosphite | Fe(H_{2}PO_{2})_{3} | hexagonal | R3̅ | a = 11.2800 c = 9.6375 Z = 6 | 1061.97 | 2.353 | | |
| hexaaquacobalt(II) bis(hypophosphite) | [Co(H_{2}O)_{6}](H_{2}PO_{2})_{2} | tetragonal | I4_{1}/acd | a=10.3406 c=20.402 Z=8 | 2181.6 | 1.809 | purple | |
| | Co(H_{2}PO_{2})_{2}•0.53H_{2}O | monoclinic | P112/a | a=6.4722 b=5.3411 c=7.4900 γ=90.087° Z=2 | | | layered, can intercallate with more water, or pyridine | |
| | Co(H_{2}PO_{2})_{2}•2H_{2}O | | | | | | | |
| | [NH_{4}][Co^{II}(H_{2}PO_{2})_{3}(H_{2}O)] | monoclinic | P2_{1}/n | a=7.367 b=14.914 c=9.205 β=108.38° | | | | |
| | CoCl(H_{2}PO_{2}).H_{2}O | orthorhombic | Pbca | a=7.416 b=13.082 c=9.483 Z=8 | 920 | 2.56 | | |
| bis(μ-hypophosphito)-bis(benzene-1,2-diamine)-cobalt dichloride | [Co(H_{2}PO_{2})(C_{12}N_{4}H_{16})]Cl_{2} | orthorhombic | Pbcn | a = 9.554 b = 9.147 c = 21.9222 Z = 2 | 1915.7 | | | |
| ortho-phenylenediamine cobalt hypophosphite chloride | [Co(H_{2}PO_{2})(C_{12}N_{4}H_{16})]Cl_{2} | orthorhombic | Pbcn | a = 9.554 b = 9.147 c = 21.9222 Z = 2 | 1915.7 | | | |
| | Co^{III}(NH_{3})_{5}(H_{2}PO_{2})(ClO_{4})_{2} | | | | | | | |
| | NaCo(H_{2}PO_{2})_{3} | cubic | P2_{1}3 | a = 9.256 Z=4 | 793.1 | | | |
| Hexaaquanickel(II) bis(hypophosphite) | [Ni(H_{2}O)_{6}](H_{2}PO_{2})_{2} | monoclinic | C2/c | a = 10.1453 b = 10.1467 c = 10.3571 β = 92.632 Z=4 | 1065.05 | 1.851 | green | |
| | [NH_{4}][Ni^{II}(H_{2}PO_{2})_{3}(H_{2}O)] | monoclinic | P2_{1}/n | a=7.3202 b=14.7961 c=9.1762 β=108.814° | | | | |
| (μ_{2}-13,27-Di-t-butyl-3,6,9,17,20,23-hexamethyl-3,6,9,17,20,23-hexaazatricyclo[23.3.1.1^{11,15}]triaconta-1(29),11(30),12,14,25,27- hexaene-29,30-dithiolato)-(μ_{2}-phosphinato-O,O')-di-nickel(ii) tetraphenylborate acetonitrile solvate | [Ni_{2}L(μ-O_{2}PH_{2})]BPh_{4} | triclinic | P1̅ | a=13.179 b=15.736 c=16.799 α=108.48° β=91.90° γ=107.61° | | | | |
| " | [Ni_{2}L(μ-O_{2}PH_{2})]ClO_{4} | | | | | | | |
| | NiCl(H_{2}PO_{2}).H_{2}O | orthorhombic | Pbca | a = 7.2986 b = 13.0616 c = 9.4078 Z = 4 | 896.85 | | pale green; hypophosphite | |
| hexaaquacobalt(II)/nickel(II) bis(hypophosphite) | [Co_{0.5}Ni_{0.5}(H_{2}O)_{6}](H_{2}PO_{2})_{2} | tetragonal | I4_{1}/acd | a=10.3111 c=20.236 Z=8 | 2163.2 | 1.823 | green | |
| | Cu(H_{2}PO_{2})_{2} | monoclinic | P2_{1}/c | a = 7.2186 b = 5.3462 c = 6.2521 β = 98.835° Z = 2 T = 270 | 238.42 | 2.696 | blue | |
| | Cu(H_{2}PO_{2})_{2} | orthorhombic | Pbca | a = 5.3259 b = 6.2720 c = 14.2590 Z=4 T = 270 | 476.31 | 2.699 | blue | |
| | Cu(H_{2}PO_{2})_{2} | orthorhombic | Pnma | a = 6.6738 b = 5.4133 c = 7.1954 Z=2 T = 270 | 259.95 | 2.472 | blue | |
| | Zn(H_{2}PO_{2})_{2} | orthorhombic | Pmma | a=6.479 b=5.365 c=7.408 | | | | |
| | Zn(H_{2}PO_{2})_{2}.H_{2}O | monoclinic | P2_{1}/c | a=7.685 b=7.376 c=10.468 β=104.16° | | | | |
| | Ge_{2}(H_{2}PO_{2})_{6} | trigonal | R3̅ | a=11.86 c=9.58 Z=3 | | 2.18 | colourless | |
| Chloro(phosphinato)germanium(II) | GeCl(H_{2}PO_{2}) | orthorhombic | Pnam | a=8.178 b=9.595 c=5.299 Z=4 | | 2.764 | | |
| Rubidium hypophosphite | RbH_{2}PO_{2} | orthorhombic | Pnma | a = 7.9835 b = 6.3678 c = 7.575 Z = 4 | 385.12 | | | |
| | Sr(H_{2}PO_{2})_{2} | monoclinic | C2/c | a = 15.655 b = 5.9436 c = 5.9177 β = 93.905° Z=4 | 549.4 | 2.631 | colourless | |
| Cadmium bis[dihydrogenphosphate(I)] | Cd(H_{2}PO_{2})_{2}•H_{2}O | monoclinic | C2/c | a = 15.156 b = 5.4692 c = 6.5516 β=102.487 Z=4 | 530.22 | 3.036 | | |
| Chloro(phosphinato)tin(II) | SnCl(H_{2}PO_{2}) | orthorhombic | Pnam | a=8.045 b=9.915 c=5.517 Z=4 | | 3.308 | | |
| Calcium hexakis(dihydrogenphosphito)stannate(IV) | Ca[Sn(H_{2}PO_{2})_{6}] | hexagonal | R3̅ | a = 11.8619 c = 9.8668 Z = 3 | 1202.31 | 2.273 | | |
| | [Sn_{2}(H_{2}PO_{2})_{3}]Br | orthorhombic | Pmn2_{1} | a=5.4177 b=7.1467 c=13.8359 Z=2 | 535.71 | 3.176 | | |
| | RbSb(SO_{4})(H_{2}PO_{2})F | orthorhombic | Pnma | a=15.1004 b=5.4481 c=8.8857 Z=4 | 731.01 | 3.519 | dark | |
| Cesium hypophosphite | CsH_{2}PO_{2} | orthorhombic | Pnma | a = 8.3776 b = 6.6271 c = 7.916 Z = 4 | 439.52 | | | |
| barium bis(dihydrogenphosphate) | Ba(H_{2}PO_{2})_{2} | orthorhombic | Ccca | a = 6.2390 b = 15.584 c = 6.1726 Z=4 | 600.2 | 2.958 | colourless | |
| | BaSb(H_{2}PO_{2})_{3}Cl_{2} | monoclinic | P2_{1} | a=8.5451 b=7.6108 c=9.0163 β=95.680° | | | SHG 5.0 × KDP; birefringence (0.09@546 nm); bandgap 4.2 eV | |
| | La(H_{2}PO_{2})_{3} | triclinic | P1̅ | a = 6.7912 b = 7.0801 c = 8.863 α = 82.64° β = 74.43^{o} γ = 71.91° Z=2 | | | | |
| | La(H_{2}PO_{2})_{3•}H_{2}O | triclinic | P1̅ | a = 7.2291 b = 7.983 c = 8.934 α =110.57° β = 98.26° γ = 104.35° Z=2 | | | | |
| | Ce(H_{2}PO_{2})_{3}(H_{2}O) | triclinic | P1̅ | a=7.1729 b=7.9827 c=8.871 α=110.643° β=98.101° γ=104.97° | | | | |
| | Pr(H_{2}PO_{2})_{3} | | | | | | | |
| | [Pr(H_{2}PO_{2})(HPO_{3})(H_{2}O)]·H_{2}O | orthorhombic | P2_{1}2_{1}2_{1} | a=6.6558 b=7.1539 c=16.5506 | | | | |
| | Nd(H_{2}PO_{2})_{3} | | | | | | | |
| | Dy(H_{2}PO_{2})_{3} | monoclinic | C2/m | a=14.368 b=5.734 c=12.123 β=122.33° | | | | |
| | Yb(H_{2}PO_{2})_{3} | monoclinic | C2/m | a=14.281 b =5.658 c=12.006 β=122.26° | | | | |
| Thallous hypophosphite | TlH_{2}PO_{2} | | | | | | melt 114°C | |
| | Pb(H_{2}PO_{2})_{2} | monoclinic | C2/c | a = 15.516 b = 6.008 c = 5.969 β = 93.30° Z=4 | 555.5 | 4.032 | colourless | |
| | U(H_{2}PO_{2})_{4} | orthorhombic | Pbca | a=7.467 b=13.394 c=19.904 Z=8 | 1990.7 | 3.323 | green | |
| | UO_{2}(H_{2}PO_{2})_{2}·H_{2}O | monoclinic | P2_{1}/n | a = 7.686 b = 9.275 c = 11.027 β = 92.32° Z=4 | 785.4 | 3.535 | colourless | |
| | UO_{2}(H_{2}PO_{2})_{2}·H_{3}PO | orthorhombic | P2_{1}2_{1}2_{1} | a = 7.1572 b = 7.2363 c = 17.554 | 901.0 | 3.435 | yellow | |

== See also ==
- Organophosphinic acid
- Phosphine - PR_{3}
- Phosphine oxide - OPR_{3}
- Phosphite - P(OR)_{3}
- Phosphonate - OP(OR)_{2}R
- Phosphate - OP(OR)_{3}
