= Hypophosphorous acid =

Chemical compound

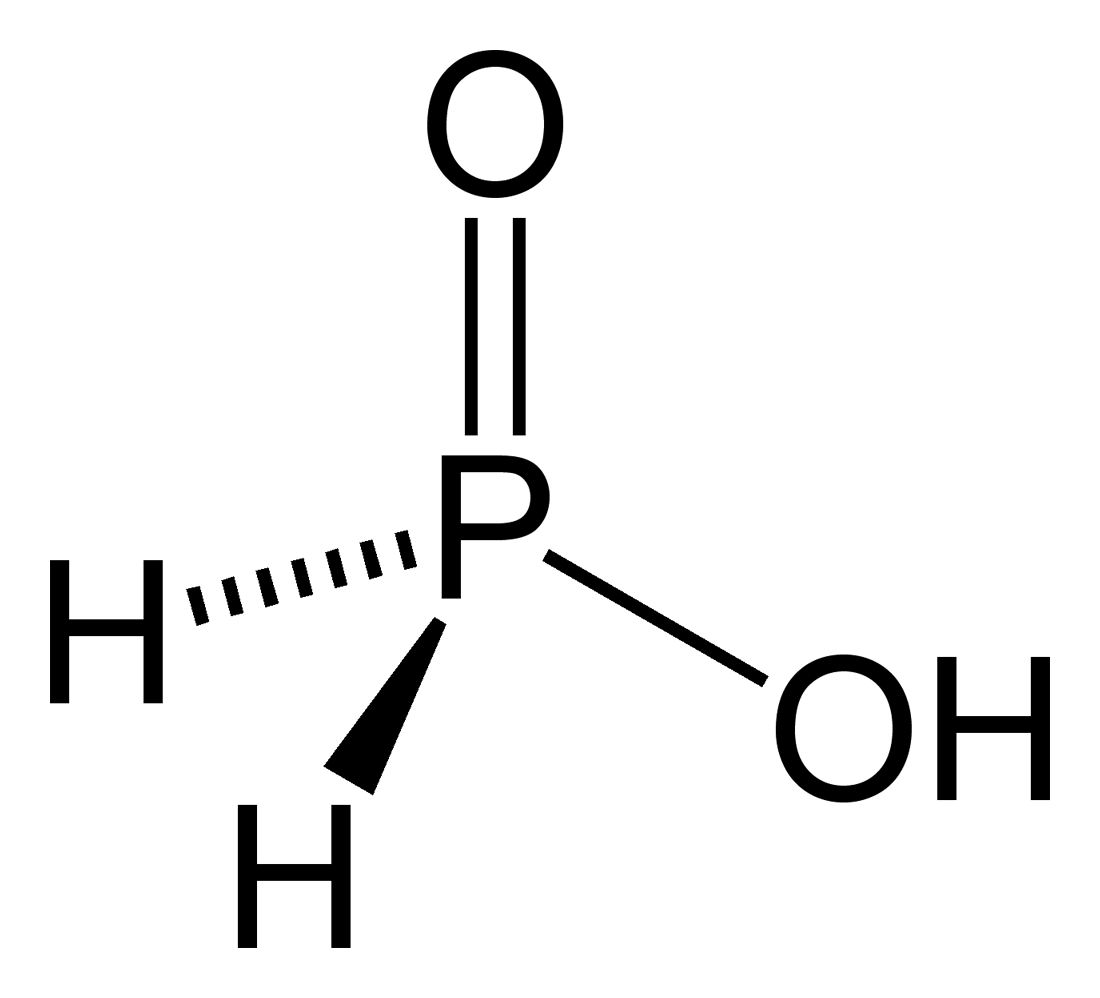
Wireframe model of hypophosphorous acid
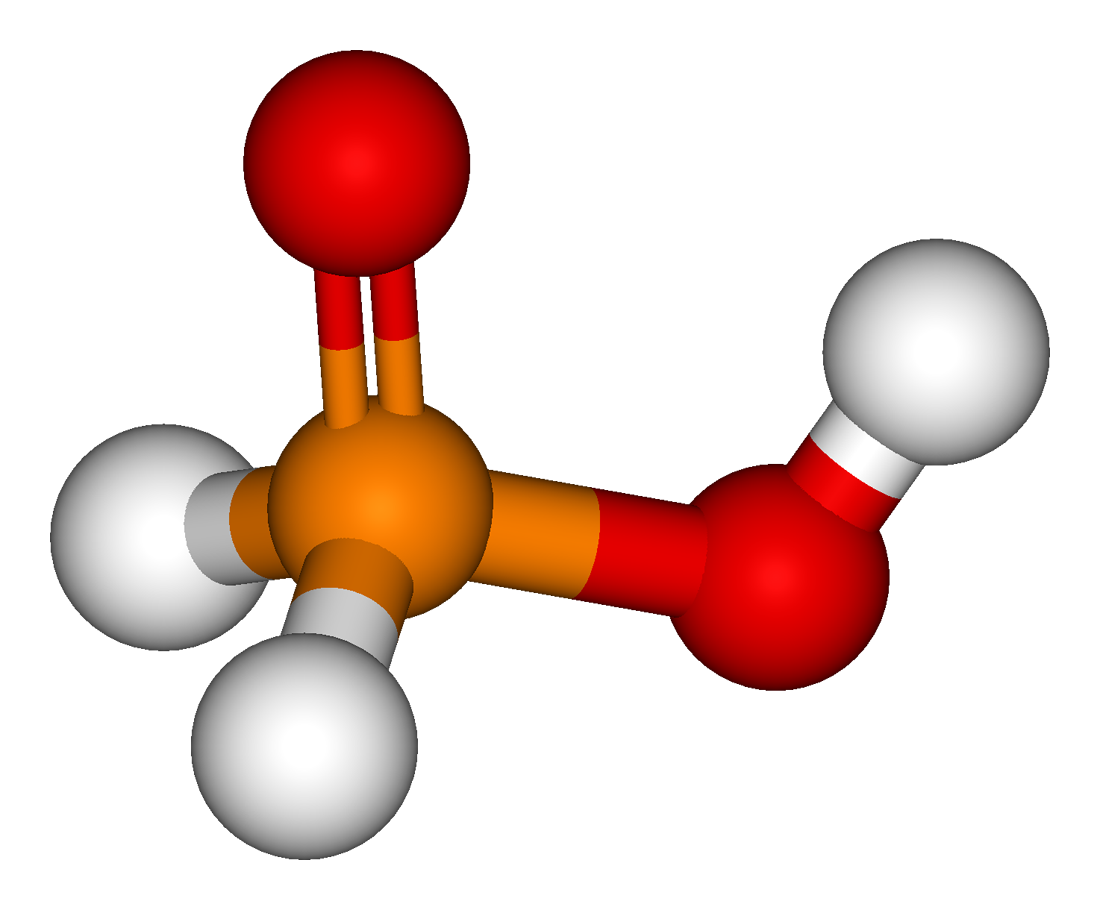

Names
- IUPAC name Phosphinic acid
- Other names Hydroxy(oxo)-λ^{5}-phosphane Hydroxy-λ^{5}-phosphanone; Oxo-λ^{5}-phosphanol; Oxo-λ^{5}-phosphinous acid Phosphonous acid (for minor tautomer)

Identifiers
CAS Number	6303-21-5
3D model (JSmol)	Interactive image
ChEBI	CHEBI:29031
ChEMBL	ChEMBL2105054
ChemSpider	10449263; 10459437 (^{17}O_{2}); 2342086 (^{2}H_{3})
ECHA InfoCard	100.026.001
KEGG	D02334
PubChem CID	3085127 (^{2}H_{3})
UNII	8B1RL9B4ZJ
UN number	UN 3264
CompTox Dashboard (EPA)	DTXSID90873902 DTXSID90206211, DTXSID90873902
- InChI: InChI=1S/H3O2P/c1-3-2/h3H2,(H,1,2) Key: ACVYVLVWPXVTIT-UHFFFAOYSA-N; InChI=1/H3O2P/c1-3-2/h3H2,(H,1,2) Key: ACVYVLVWPXVTIT-UHFFFAOYAQ
- SMILES: O[PH2]=O

Properties
Chemical formula	H_{3}PO_{2}
Molar mass	66.00 g/mol
Appearance	colorless, deliquescent crystals or oily liquid
Density	1.493 g/cm^{3} 1.22 g/cm^{3} (50 wt% aq. solution)
Melting point	26.5 °C (79.7 °F; 299.6 K)
Boiling point	130 °C (266 °F; 403 K) decomposes
Solubility in water	miscible
Solubility	very soluble in alcohol, ether
Acidity (pK_{a})	0.89±0.05
Conjugate base	Phosphinate

Structure
Molecular shape	pseudo-tetrahedral

Hazards
Flash point	Non-flammable
Safety data sheet (SDS)	JT Baker

Related compounds
Related phosphorus oxoacids	Phosphorous acid Phosphoric acid
Related compounds	Sodium hypophosphite Barium hypophosphite
- Except where otherwise noted, data are given for materials in their standard state (at 25 °C [77 °F], 100 kPa). verify (what is ?) Infobox references

Hypophosphorous acid (HPA), or phosphinic acid, is a phosphorus oxyacid and a powerful reducing agent with molecular formula H_{3}PO_{2}. It is a colorless low-melting compound, which is soluble in water, dioxane and alcohols. The formula for this acid is generally written H_{3}PO_{2}, but a more descriptive presentation is HOP(O)H_{2}, which highlights its monoprotic character. Salts derived from this acid are called hypophosphites.

HOP(O)H_{2} exists in equilibrium with the minor tautomer HP(OH)_{2}. Sometimes the minor tautomer is called hypophosphorous acid and the major tautomer is called phosphinic acid.

== Preparation and availability ==
Hypophosphorous acid was first prepared in 1816 by the French chemist Pierre Louis Dulong (1785–1838).

The acid is prepared industrially via a two step process: Firstly, elemental white phosphorus reacts with alkali and alkaline earth hydroxides to give an aqueous solution of hypophosphites:

P_{4} + 4 OH^{−} + 4 H_{2}O → 4 H_{2}PO^{−}_{2} + 2 H_{2}

Any phosphites produced in this step can be selectively precipitated out by treatment with calcium salts. The purified material is then treated with a strong, non-oxidizing acid (often sulfuric acid) to give the free hypophosphorous acid:

H_{2}PO^{−}_{2} + H^{+} → H_{3}PO_{2}

HPA is usually supplied as a 50% aqueous solution. Anhydrous acid cannot be obtained by simple evaporation of the water, as the acid readily oxidises to phosphorous acid and phosphoric acid and also disproportionates to phosphorous acid and phosphine. Pure anhydrous hypophosphorous acid can be formed by the continuous extraction of aqueous solutions with diethyl ether.

== Properties ==
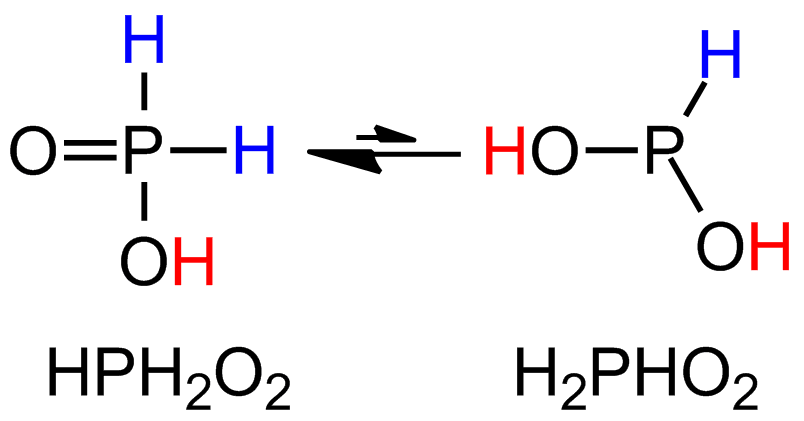

The molecule displays P(═O)H to P–OH tautomerism similar to that of phosphorous acid; the P(═O) form is strongly favoured.

HPA is usually supplied as a 50% aqueous solution and heating at low temperatures (up to about 90 °C) prompts it to react with water to form phosphorous acid and hydrogen gas.

H_{3}PO_{2} + H_{2}O → H_{3}PO_{3} + H_{2}

Heating above 110 °C causes hypophosphorous acid to undergo disproportionation to give phosphorous acid and phosphine.

3 H_{3}PO_{2} → 2 H_{3}PO_{3} + PH_{3}

== Reactions ==
=== Inorganic ===
Hypophosphorous acid can reduce chromium(III) oxide to chromium(II) oxide:

H_{3}PO_{2} + 2 Cr_{2}O_{3} → 4 CrO + H_{3}PO_{4}

=== Inorganic derivatives ===
Most metal-hypophosphite complexes are unstable, owing to the tendency of hypophosphites to reduce metal cations back into the bulk metal. Some examples have been characterised, including the important nickel salt [Ni(H_{2}O)_{6}](H_{2}PO_{2})_{2}.

==== DEA List I chemical status ====
Because hypophosphorous acid can reduce elemental iodine to form hydroiodic acid, which is a reagent effective for reducing ephedrine or pseudoephedrine to methamphetamine, the United States Drug Enforcement Administration designated hypophosphorous acid (and its salts) as a List I precursor chemical effective November 16, 2001. Accordingly, handlers of hypophosphorous acid or its salts in the United States are subject to stringent regulatory controls including registration, recordkeeping, reporting, and import/export requirements pursuant to the Controlled Substances Act and 21 CFR §§ 1309 and 1310.

=== Organic ===
In organic chemistry, H_{3}PO_{2} can be used for the reduction of arenediazonium salts, converting Ar−^{+}N≡N to Ar−H. When diazotized in a concentrated solution of hypophosphorous acid, an amine substituent can be removed from arenes.

Owing to its ability to function as a mild reducing agent and oxygen scavenger it is sometimes used as an additive in Fischer esterification reactions, where it prevents the formation of colored impurities.

It is used to prepare phosphinic acid derivatives.

== Applications ==
Hypophosphorous acid (and its salts) are used to reduce metal salts back into bulk metals. It is effective for various transition metals ions (i.e. those of: Co, Cu, Ag, Mn, Pt) but is most commonly used to reduce nickel. This forms the basis of electroless nickel plating (Ni–P), which is the single largest industrial application of hypophosphites. For this application it is principally used as a salt (sodium hypophosphite).

== Sources ==
- Cotton, F. Albert; Wilkinson, Geoffrey; Murillo, Carlos A.; Bochmann, Manfred (1999), Advanced Inorganic Chemistry (6th ed.), New York: Wiley-Interscience, ISBN 0-471-19957-5
- Corbridge, D. E. C. (1995). Phosphorus: An Outline of its Chemistry, Biochemistry, and Technology (5th ed.). Amsterdam: Elsevier. ISBN 0-444-89307-5.
- Popik, V. V.; Wright, A. G.; Khan, T. A.; Murphy, J. A. (2004). "Hypophosphorous Acid". In Paquette, L. (ed.). Encyclopedia of Reagents for Organic Synthesis. New York: J. Wiley & Sons. doi:10.1002/047084289X. hdl:10261/236866. ISBN 978-0-471-93623-7.
- Rich, D. W.; Smith, M. C. (1971). Electroless Deposition of Nickel, Cobalt & Iron. Poughkeepsie, NY: IBM Corporation.
