= Copper electroplating =

Process of electroplating copper

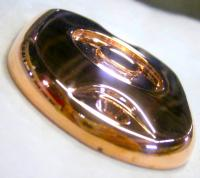
Copper plating on aluminium

Copper electroplating is the process of electroplating a layer of copper onto the surface of a metal object. Copper is used both as a standalone coating and as an undercoat onto which other metals are subsequently plated. The copper layer can be decorative, provide corrosion resistance, increase electrical and thermal conductivity, or improve the adhesion of additional deposits to the substrate.

== Overview ==
Copper electroplating takes place in an electrolytic cell using electrolysis. As with all plating processes, the part to be plated must be cleaned before depositing metal to remove soils, grease, oxides, and defects. After precleaning, the part is immersed in the cell's aqueous electrolyte solution and functions as the cathode. A copper anode is also immersed in the solution. During plating, a direct electric current is applied to the cell which causes the copper in the anode to dissolve into the electrolyte through oxidation, losing electrons and ionizing into copper cations. The copper cations form a coordination complex with salts present in the electrolyte, after which they are transported from the anode to the cathode. At the cathode, the copper ions are reduced to metallic copper by gaining electrons. This causes a thin, solid, metallic copper film to deposit onto the surface of the part.

The anodes can be either simple copper slabs or titanium or steel baskets filled with copper nuggets or balls. The anodes may be placed in anode bags, which are typically made of polypropylene or another fabric and are used to contain insoluble particles that flake off the anode and prevent them from contaminating the plating bath.

Copper electroplating baths can be used to plate either a strike or flash coating, which is a thin highly-adherent initial layer that is plated with additional layers of metal and that serves to improve adhesion of the subsequent layers to the underlying substrate, or a thicker coating of copper that may serve as the finish layer or as a standalone coating.

== Types of plating chemistries ==
There are a variety of different electrolyte chemistries that can be used for copper electroplating, but most can be broadly characterized into five general categories based on the complexing agent:

1. Alkaline cyanide
2. Alkaline non-cyanide
3. Acid sulfate
4. Acid fluoroborate
5. Pyrophosphate

=== Alkaline cyanide ===
Alkaline cyanide baths have historically been one of the most commonly used plating chemistries for copper electrodeposition. Cyanide copper baths typically provide high covering and throwing power, allowing uniform and complete coverage of the substrate, but often plate at lower current efficiency. They produce a metal finish favored for its diffusion blocking character. Diffusion blocking is used to improve the long term adherence of different metals, e.g. chromium and steel. It is also used to prevent the second material from diffusing into the substrate.

Cyanide baths contain cuprous cyanide as the source of copper(I) ions, sodium or potassium cyanide as a source of free cyanide that complexes with cuprous cyanide to render it soluble, and sodium or potassium hydroxide for increased conductivity and pH control. Baths may also contain Rochelle salts and sodium or potassium carbonate, as well as a variety of proprietary additives. Cyanide copper baths can be used as low-efficiency strike-only baths, medium-efficiency strike-plate baths, and high efficiency plating baths.

==== Bath composition ====
Chemical Name	Formula	Strike		Strike-plate		High-efficiency plate	
Chemical Name	Formula	Sodium	Potassium	Sodium	Potassium	Sodium	Potassium
Copper(I) cyanide	CuCN	30 g/L	30 g/L	42 g/L	42 g/L	75 g/L	60 g/L
Sodium or potassium cyanide	NaCN or KCN	48 g/L	58.5 g/L	51.9 g/L	66.6 g/L	97.5 g/L	102 g/L
Sodium or potassium hydroxide	NaOH or KOH	3.75–7.5 g/L	3.75–7.5 g/L	Control to pH 10.2–10.5		15 g/L	15 g/L
Rochelle salts	KNaC_{4}H_{4}O_{6}·4H_{2}O	30 g/L	30 g/L	60 g/L	60 g/L	45 g/L	45 g/L
Sodium or potassium carbonate	Na_{2}CO_{3} or K_{2}CO_{3}	15 g/L	15 g/L	30 g/L	30 g/L	15 g/L	15 g/L

==== Operating conditions ====
- Temperature: 24-66 °C (strike); 40-55 °C (strike-plate); 60-71 °C (high-efficiency)
- Cathode current density: 0.5-4.0 A/dm^{2} (strike); 1.0-1.5 A/dm^{2} (strike-plate); 8.6 A/dm^{2} (high-efficiency)
- Current efficiency: 30-60% (strike); 30-50% (strike-plate); 90-99% (high-efficiency);
- pH: >11.0

==== Toxicity ====
Commercial platers typically use a copper cyanide solution, which retains a high concentration of copper. However, the presence of free cyanide in the baths makes them dangerous due to the highly toxic nature of cyanide. This creates both health hazards as well as issues with waste disposal.

=== Alkaline non-cyanide ===
Due to safety concerns surrounding the use of cyanide-based plating chemistry, alkaline copper plating baths that do not contain cyanide have been developed. However, they generally see only limited use compared with the more common cyanide-based alkaline chemistry.

=== Acid sulfate ===
Acid copper sulfate electrolytes are relatively simple solutions of copper sulfate and sulfuric acid that are cheaper and easier to maintain and control than cyanide copper electrolytes. Compared to cyanide baths, they provide higher current efficiency and allow for higher current density and thus faster plating rates, but they usually have less throwing power, although high-throw variations exist. Additionally, they cannot be used to plate directly onto less-noble metals such as steel or zinc without first applying a cyanide-based strike or other barrier layer, otherwise the acid in the bath will cause an immersion coating to form that will compromise adhesion. Due to this phenomenon as well as the lower throwing power, acid sulfate baths are not usually used as strike baths.

Along with alkaline cyanide, acid copper baths are among the most commonly used copper plating electrolytes, with industrial applications that include decorative plating, electroforming, rotogravure, and printed circuit board and semiconductor fabrication.

Acid sulfate baths contain cupric sulfate as the source of copper(II) ions; sulfuric acid to increase bath conductivity, ensure copper salt solubility, decrease anode and cathode polarization, and increase throwing power; and a source of chloride ions such as hydrochloric acid or sodium chloride, which helps reduce anode polarization and prevents striated deposits from forming. Most baths also contain a variety of organic additives to help refine the grain structure, improve ductility, and brighten the deposit. Variations of the acid copper electrolyte include general-purpose baths, high-throw baths, and high-speed baths. The high-throw and high-speed baths are used when greater throwing power and faster plating rates are required, including for printed circuit board fabrication where high throw is required to plate the low-current-density areas in the through holes.

==== Bath composition ====
Chemical Name	Formula	Bath concentration		
Chemical Name	Formula	General-purpose	High-throw	High-speed
Copper(II) sulfate	CuSO_{4}	190–250 g/L	60–90 g/L	80–135 g/L
Sulfuric acid	H_{2}SO_{4}	45–90 g/L	150–225 g/L	185–260 g/L
Chloride ion	Cl^{−}	20–150 ppm	30–80 ppm	40–80 ppm
Additives	Varies	Varies		

==== Operating conditions ====
- Temperature: Usually ambient, although some baths may operate as high as 43 °C
- Cathode current density: 2–20 A/dm^{2} (general purpose); 1.5–5 A/dm^{2} (high throw); 5–20 A/dm^{2} (high speed)
- Current efficiency: 100%

==== Additives ====
Various common and proprietary additives have been developed for acid copper electrolytes to help improve throwing and leveling power, brighten the finish, control hardness and ductility, and impart other desired properties to the deposit. Historical formulations dating to the mid-20th century often used thiourea and molasses, while other formulations used various gums, carbohydrates, and sulfonic acids.

For semiconductor and printed circuit board applications, acid copper baths use additives that facilitate plating in high-aspect-ratio vias and through holes. Such additives can be grouped into three categories:

- Suppressors (also known as inhibitors or carriers) (typically polyethers such as polyethylene glycol or polypropylene glycol)
- Accelerators (also known as brighteners) (typically thiols or disulfides such as 3-Mercapto-1-propanesulfonic acid or bis-(3-sodium sulfopropyl) disulfide)
- Levelers (examples include dyes such as Janus Green B, Alcian Blue, and Diazine Black)

Without these additives, copper will preferentially deposit on the surface near the top of the vias instead of inside the vias due to the lower local current density inside the vias, leading to top-down via filling and undesirable voids. The suppressor inhibits plating near the top of the via and the surface, while the brightener accelerates plating near the bottom of the via. The leveler helps prevent buildup at the via opening and creates a smoother surface finish.

=== Acid fluoroborate ===
Copper fluoroborate baths are similar to acid sulfate baths, but they use fluoroborate as the anion rather than sulfate. Copper fluoroborate is much more soluble than copper sulfate, which allows one to dissolve larger quantities of copper salt into the bath, enabling much higher current densities than what is possible in copper sulfate baths. Their main use is for high-speed plating where high current densities are required. Drawbacks to the fluoroborate chemistry include lower throwing power than acid sulfate baths, higher cost to operate, and greater safety hazards and waste treatment concerns.

Acid fluoroborate baths contain cupric tetrafluoroborate and fluoroboric acid. Boric acid is typically added to the bath to prevent hydrolysis of the fluoroborate ions, which generates free fluoride in the bath. Unlike acid sulfate baths, fluoroborate baths usually do not contain organic additives.

==== Bath composition ====
Chemical Name	Formula	Bath concentration	
Chemical Name	Formula	High concentration	Low concentration
Copper(II) tetrafluoroborate	Cu(BF_{4})_{2}	459 g/L	225 g/L
Fluoroboric acid	HBF_{4}	40.5 g/L	15 g/L

==== Operating conditions ====
- Temperature: 18-66 °C
- Cathode current density: 13-38 A/dm^{2} (high concentration); 8-13 A/dm^{2} (low concentration)
- pH: 0.2-0.6 (high concentration); 1.0-1.7 (low concentration)

=== Pyrophosphate ===
Pyrophosphate copper plating baths possess gentler chemistry compared to the toxic alkaline cyanide baths and the corrosive acid copper baths, operating at mildly alkaline pH and utilizing relatively non-toxic pyrophosphate compounds. While pyrophosphate electrolytes are easier to waste treat than alkaline cyanide and acid plating baths, they are more difficult to maintain and control. Pyrophosphate baths offer high throwing power and produce bright, ductile deposits, making them particularly useful for printed circuit board fabrication where high throw is required for plating high-aspect-ratio through holes.

Pyrophosphate baths contain cupric pyrophosphate as a source of copper(II) ions, potassium pyrophosphate as a source of free pyrophosphate that increases bath conductivity and helps with anode dissolution, ammonia for increased anode dissolution and deposit grain refinement, and a source of nitrate ions such as potassium or ammonium nitrate to decrease cathode polarization and increase the maximum allowed current density. When the bath is made up, the copper pyrophosphate and potassium pyrophosphate react to form a complex, [K_{6}Cu(P_{2}O_{7})_{2}], which dissociates to form the Cu(P_{2}O_{7})_{2}^{6−} anion from which copper deposits. Variations of the pyrophosphate electrolyte include general-purpose baths, strike baths, and printed circuit baths. Printed circuit baths typically contain organic additives to improve ductility and throwing power.

In pyrophosphate baths, orthophosphate ions are formed from the hydrolysis of pyrophosphate and tend to build up in the electrolyte over time, which presents maintenance challenges. Orthophosphate ions decrease bath throwing power and deposit ductility at concentrations above 40–60 g/L, and they lead to lower solution conductivity, banded deposits, and lower bright current density range at concentrations beyond 100 g/L. Orthophosphate is removed from the bath by either doing partial bails and dilutions or by completely dumping and remaking the bath.

== Current control ==
It is important to control the current to produce the smoothest copper surface possible. With a higher current, hydrogen bubbles will form on the item to be plated, leaving surface imperfections. Often various other chemicals are added to improve plating uniformity and brightness. These additives can be anything from dish soap to proprietary compounds. Without some form of additive, it is almost impossible to obtain a smooth plated surface.

The surface formed always needs to be polished to achieve a shine. As formed it has a matte luster.

== Applications ==
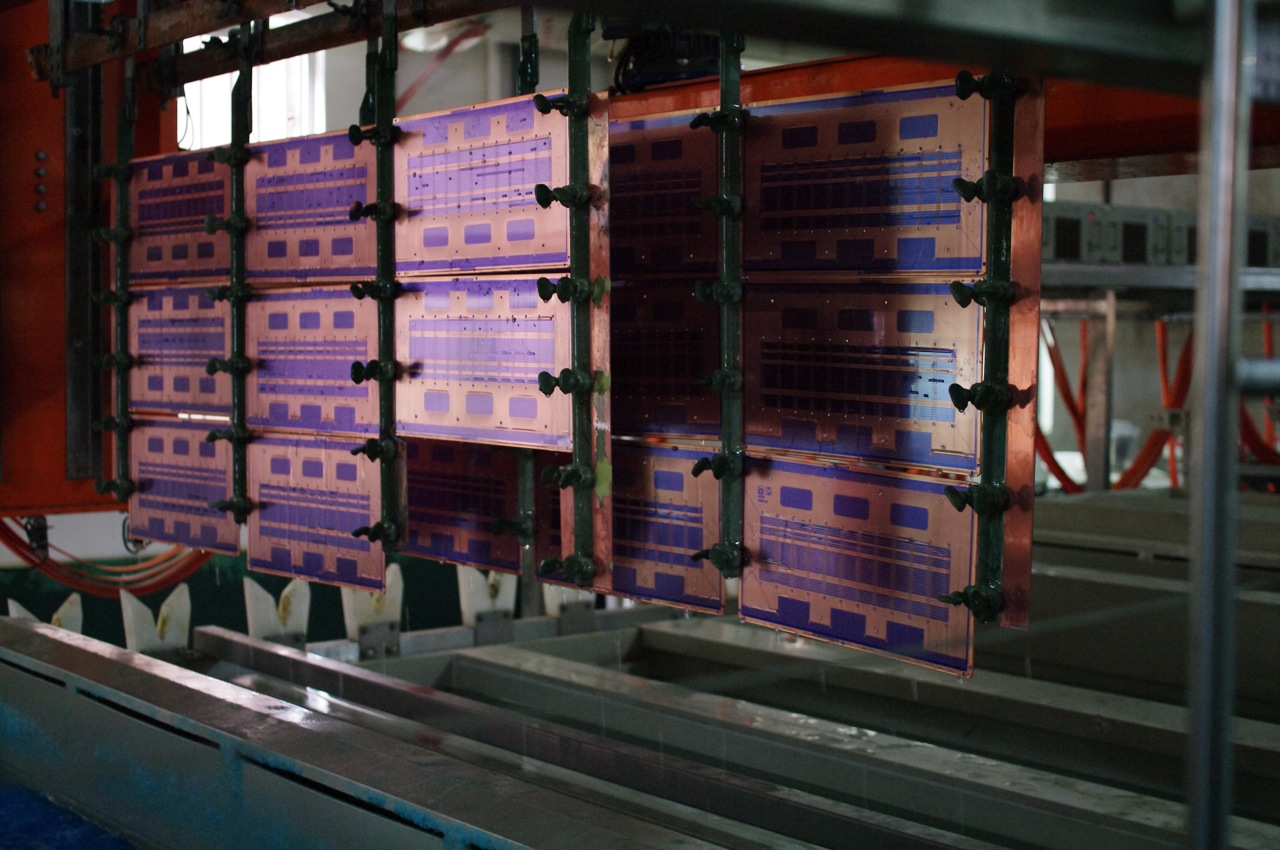
PCBs being fabricated in an industrial copper pattern plating line

Excluding the continuous strip plating industry, copper is the second most commonly plated metal after nickel. Copper electroplating offers a number of advantages over other plating processes, including low metal cost, high-conductivity and high-ductility bright finish, and high plating efficiency. The process has a variety of both decorative and engineering applications.

=== Decorative applications ===
Decorative copper electroplating takes advantage of the high levelling power of copper bath formulations that produce bright deposits, the ability of copper to cover defects in the base metal, and the softness of copper that makes it easy to buff and polish for a glossy finish. While copper may be used as the final decorative surface layer, it is usually subsequently plated with other metals that are more resistant to wear or tarnish such as chromium, nickel, or gold; in this case, the brightness of the copper undercoat enhances the appearance of the subsequent finish layer. Products that utilize decorative copper plating include automotive trim, furniture, door and cabinet handles, light fixtures, kitchen utensils, other household goods, and apparel.

Copper plating is also used for minting currency.

=== Engineering applications ===
Copper electroplating sees widespread usage in the manufacture of electrical and electronic devices, owing to copper's high electrical conductivity – it is the second-most electrically conductive metal after silver. Copper is electroplated onto printed circuit boards to add metal to the through holes and fabricate the board's conductive circuit traces. This is done either through a subtractive process where copper is plated as a blanket unpatterned layer that is subsequently etched with a patterned mask to form the desired circuitry (panel plating), or through an additive or semi-additive process where a patterned mask that exposes the desired circuitry is applied to the board followed by copper plating onto the unmasked circuit areas (pattern plating). The semiconductor industry uses the damascene process to pattern-plate copper into vias and trenches of interconnects for metallization. Copper is also used to plate steel wire for electrical cabling applications.

As a soft metal, copper is also malleable and so has the inherent flexibility to maintain adhesion even if a substrate is subject to being bent and manipulated post plating. When electroplated, copper provides a smooth and even coverage which therefore provides an excellent base for additional coating or plating processes. Corrosion resistance is another advantage to copper. Although copper is not as effective at resisting corrosion as nickel and so is commonly used as a base layer for nickel if enhanced corrosion protection is needed; typically the case for materials that are required to work in marine and subsea environments. Lastly, copper has anti-bacterial properties and so is used in some medical applications.

== See also ==
- Copper-clad aluminium wire
- Electroless copper plating
- Electroplating
