= Sodium hypophosphite =

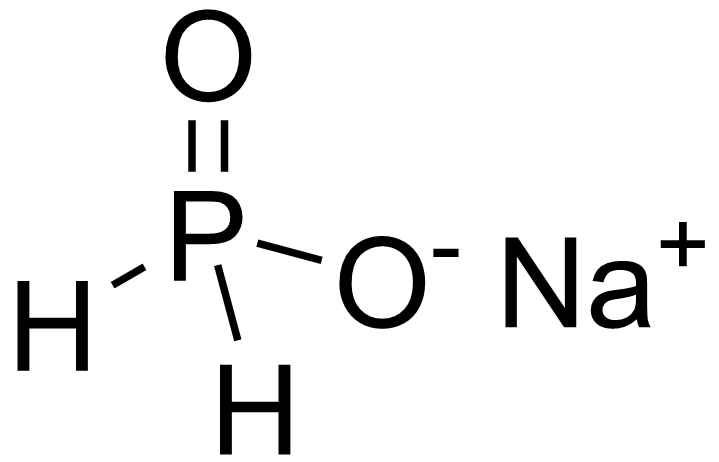
- One sodium cation and one hypophosphite anion

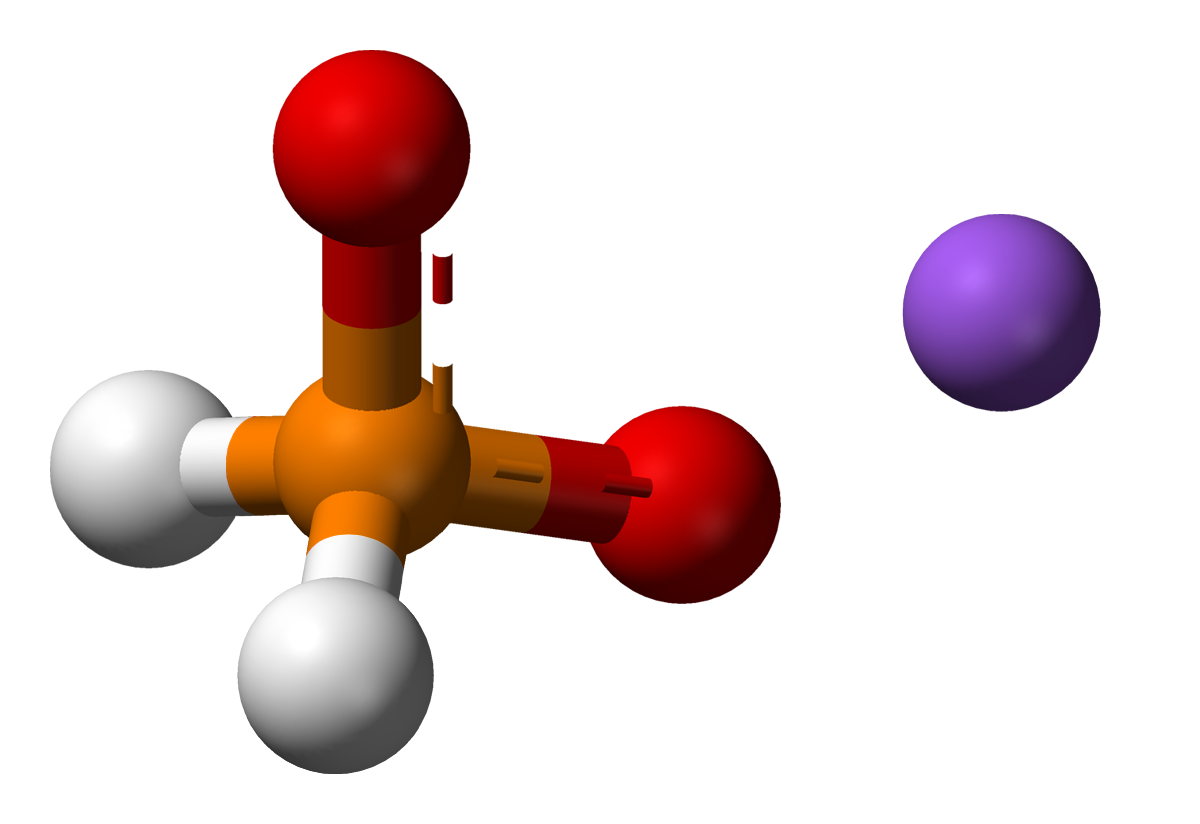
- Ball-and-stick model of the component ions

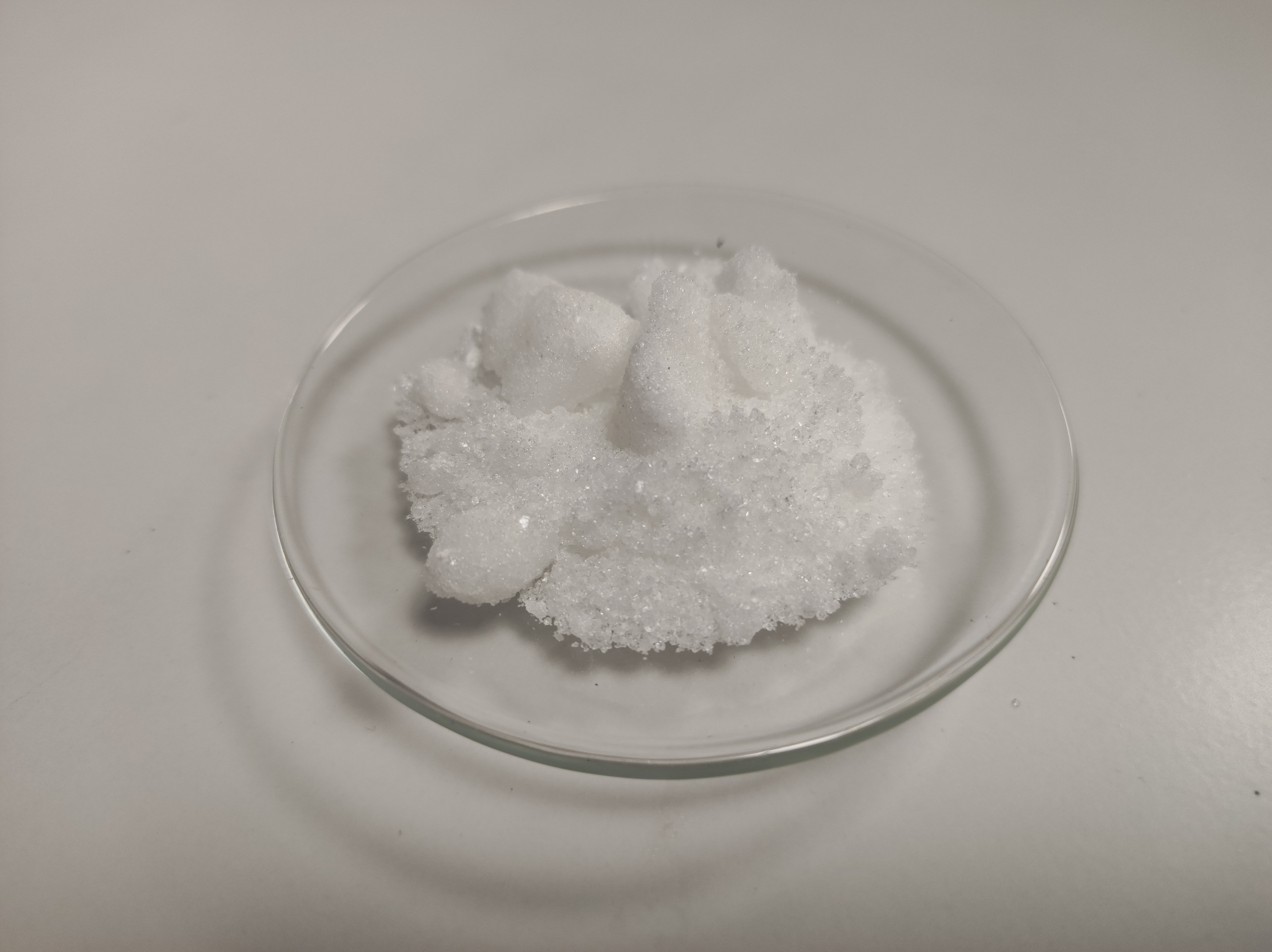

Names
- IUPAC name Sodium phosphinate

Identifiers
CAS Number	7681-53-0; 10039-56-2 (monohydrate)
3D model (JSmol)	Interactive image
ChemSpider	21241942
ECHA InfoCard	100.028.791
PubChem CID	16129646
RTECS number	SZ5640000 (monohydrate)
UNII	8TU1537O43; 4VN69WUP7N (monohydrate)
CompTox Dashboard (EPA)	DTXSID30873901
- InChI: InChI=1S/Na.H3O2P/c;1-3-2/h;3H2,(H,1,2)/q+1;/p-1 Key: SIGUVTURIMRFDD-UHFFFAOYSA-M; InChI=1/Na.H3O2P/c;1-3-2/h;3H2,(H,1,2)/q+1;/p-1 Key: SIGUVTURIMRFDD-REWHXWOFAI
- SMILES: [O-][PH2]=O.[Na+]

Properties
Chemical formula	NaPO_{2}H_{2}
Molar mass	87.98 g/mol (anhydrous); 105.99 g/mol (monohydrate)
Appearance	white solid
Density	0.8 g/cm^{3} (monohydrate)
Melting point	310 °C (590 °F; 583 K) (monohydrate)
Solubility in water	soluble
Solubility	Ethanol, Acetic acid, Ethylene glycol, Propylene glycol

Hazards
Flash point	Non-flammable

Related compounds
Other anions	Sodium phosphite Monosodium phosphate Disodium phosphate Trisodium phosphate
Other cations	Potassium hypophosphite
Related compounds	Hypophosphorous acid
- Except where otherwise noted, data are given for materials in their standard state (at 25 °C [77 °F], 100 kPa). verify (what is ?) Infobox references

Sodium hypophosphite (NaPO_{2}H_{2}, also known as sodium phosphinate) is the sodium salt of hypophosphorous acid and is often encountered as the monohydrate, NaPO_{2}H_{2}·H_{2}O. It is a solid at room temperature, appearing as odorless white crystals. It is soluble in water, and easily absorbs moisture from the air.

Sodium hypophosphite should be kept in a cool, dry place, isolated from oxidizing materials. It decomposes into phosphine which is irritating to the respiratory tract and disodium phosphate.

2 NaH_{2}PO_{2} → PH_{3} + Na_{2}HPO_{4}

== Uses ==
Like other hypophosphites, sodium hypophosphite can reduce metal ions back into base metal. This forms the basis for electroless nickel plating (Ni-P), which is its main industrial application. With this method, a durable nickel-phosphorus film can coat objects with irregular surfaces, such as in avionics, aviation and the petroleum field.

Sodium hypophosphite is capable of reducing nickel ions in solution to metallic nickel on metal substrates as well as on plastic substrates. The latter requires that the substrate is activated with fine particles of palladium. The resulting nickel deposit contains up to 15% phosphorus.

It has been investigated as a food additive.

== DEA List I status ==
The United States Drug Enforcement Administration designated sodium hypophosphite as a List I chemical under 21 CFR 1310.02 effective November 17, 2001, specifically mentioning the compound together with several other salts of hypophosphorous acid.
