= Shibasaki =

Shibasaki (written: 柴崎, 柴咲, etc.) is a Japanese surname. Notable people with the surname include:

- Gaku Shibasaki (柴崎 岳; born 1992), Japanese footballer
- Gehamat Shibasaki (born 1998), Australian rugby league footballer
- Jamal Shibasaki (born 2005), Australian rugby league footballer
- Kosei Shibasaki (柴崎 晃誠; born 1984), Japanese footballer
- Ko Shibasaki (柴咲 コウ; born 1981), Japanese actress
- Masakatsu Shibasaki (柴崎 正勝; born 1947), Japanese chemist
- Takahiro Shibasaki (柴崎 貴広; born 1982), Japanese footballer
- Tomoka Shibasaki (柴崎 友香; born 1973), Japanese writer

== Fictional characters ==
- Shibasaki family, fictional family in the anime Rozen Maiden

== See also ==
- Shibasaki Station, a railway station in Chōfu, Tokyo, Japan
