= Charles P. Casey =

American chemist (1942-2025)

Charles P. Casey (January 11, 1942 – December 21, 2025) was an organometallic chemist who was the 2004 President of the American Chemical Society. He was the Homer Adkins Professor Emeritus of Chemistry at the University of Wisconsin-Madison. He was elected to the National Academy of Sciences in 1993.

== Education ==
Casey received his B.S. in Chemistry from St. Louis University in 1963, and his Ph.D. in Chemistry from MIT in 1967 under the direction of George M. Whitesides. His thesis title was "Thermal decomposition of organocopper(I) compounds". He was then a postdoctoral fellow in organic chemistry at Harvard University from 1967-1968.

== Academic career ==
Casey's research program focused on the mechanisms of homogeneously catalyzed reactions, and creating new reagents for organic synthesis including heterobimetallic catalysts. More recently, his research had included studies of diruthenium hydrogenation catalysts, which contain both a protic and a hydridic hydrogen, and hydroformylation reaction catalyzed by chelating diphosphines with large P-M-P angles.

Casey had been a member of the faculty of the Department of Chemistry at the University of Wisconsin since 1968. He achieved the rank of Full Professor in 1977. Named positions he has held at Wisconsin include the Romnes Faculty Fellowship (1977), the Evan P. Helfaer Professorship (1985-1991), and the Homer B. Adkins Professorship (2004–present). Among the significant awards he had received for his research are the American Chemical Society Award in Organometallic Chemistry in 1991, and the American Chemical Society Award for the Advancement of Inorganic Chemistry in 2011.

Casey's advisees include Steven H. Bertz, Joseph M. O'Connor, R. Morris Bullock, Seth R. Marder, Ross A. Widenhoefer, William D. Jones, Richard F. Jordan, Robert E. Colborn, L. Keith Woo, and Jon A. Tunge.

== Death ==
Casey died on December 21, 2025.
