= Masakatsu Shibasaki =

Japanese chemist

- Born: 25 January 1947; Saitama, Japan
- Education: University of Tokyo
- Known for: Shibasaki catalysts, Binol, enantioselective heterobimetallic catalysis
- Awards: American Chemical Society Award for Creative Work in Synthetic Organic Chemistry (2008)
- Scientific career
- Fields: Chemistry
- Workplaces: Microbial Chemistry Research Center
- Doctoral advisor: Shun’ichi Yamada

Masakatsu Shibasaki (柴崎 正勝, Shibasaki Masakatsu; born 25 January 1947) is a Japanese chemist. In 1974 he earned his doctorate in chemistry, in the group of Shun’ichi Yamada. He did a post doc with Elias J. Corey at Harvard. He returned to Japan and became a professor in 1977 at Teikyō University and moved to Hokkaidō University in 1986. 1983–1986 Shibasaki was a research group leader at the Sagami chemical research center. From 1991 until 2010 he served as professor at Tokyo University. Since 2010 he is representative director of Microbial Chemistry Research Foundation (Chemistry), Tokyo. He is perhaps best known for developing a range of binol based heterobimetallic catalysts, which now bear his name.

== Selected publications ==
- Organic Synthesis Directed Toward Life Science, (Japanese), Kodansha, 1985.
- Organic Chemistry for Graduate Students, (Japanese), Tokyo Kagaku Dojin, 1998.
- Asymmetric Reaction for the Basis of Medicinal Chemistry, （Japanese, Hirokawa Shoten
- Stimulating Concepts in Chemistry, (English), VCH Verlagsgesellschaft mbH, 2000.
- Multimetallic Catalysts In Organic Synthesis, (English), John Wiley & Sons Inc., 2004.
- New Development of Organocatalyst, (Japanese), CMC publishing Co., Ltd., 2006.
- Shibasaki M, Yoshikawa N: Lanthanide complexes in multifunctional asymmetric catalysis, Chemical Reviews 102 (2002) 2187–2209.
- Sasai H, Suzuki T, Arai S, Arai T, Shibasaki M: Basic Character of Rare-Earth-Metal Alkoxides – Utilization in Catalytic C-C Bond-Forming Reactions and Catalytic Asymmetric Nitroaldol Reactions, Journal of the American Chemical Society 114 (1992) 4418–4420.
- Yoshikawa N, Yamada YMA, Das J, Sasai H, Shibasaki M: Direct catalytic asymmetric aldol reaction, Journal of the American Chemical Society 121 (1999) 4168–4178.
- Yamada YMA, Yoshikawa N, Sasai H, Shibasaki M: Direct catalytic asymmetric aldol reactions of aldehydes with unmodified ketones, Angewandte Chemie International Edition in English 36 (1997) 1871–1873.
- Sasai H, Arai T, Satow Y, Houk KN, Shibasaki M: The first Heterobimetallic Multifunctional Asymmetric Catalyst, Journal of the American Chemical Society 117 (1995) 6194–6198.
- Shibasaki M, Boden CDJ, Kojima A: The asymmetric Heck reaction, Tetrahedron 53 (1997) 7371–7395.
- Gröger H, Vogl EM, Shibasaki M: New catalytic concepts for the asymmetric aldol reaction, Chemistry – a European Journal 4 (1998) 1137–1141.
- Hamashima Y, Sawada D, Kanai M, Shibasaki M: A new bifunctional asymmetric catalysis: An efficient catalytic asymmetric cyanosilylation of aldehydes, Journal of the American Chemical Society 121 (1999) 2641–2642.
- Bougauchi M, Watanabe S, Arai T, Sasai H, Shibasaki M: Catalytic asymmetric epoxidation of alpha,beta-unsaturated ketones promoted by lanthanoid complexes, Journal of the American Chemical Society 119 (1997) 2329–2330.
- Arai T, Sasai H, Aoe K, Okamura K, Date T, Shibasaki M: A new multifunctional heterobimetallic asymmetric catalyst for Michael additions and tandem Michael-Aldol reactions, Angewandte Chemie-International Edition in English 35 (1996) 104–106.

His research interests are focussed on the development of new synthetic methods, the design of biologically significant compounds and synthetic studies of such compounds.
