= Chiral phosphoric acid =

Esters of phosphoric acid with a chiral backbone

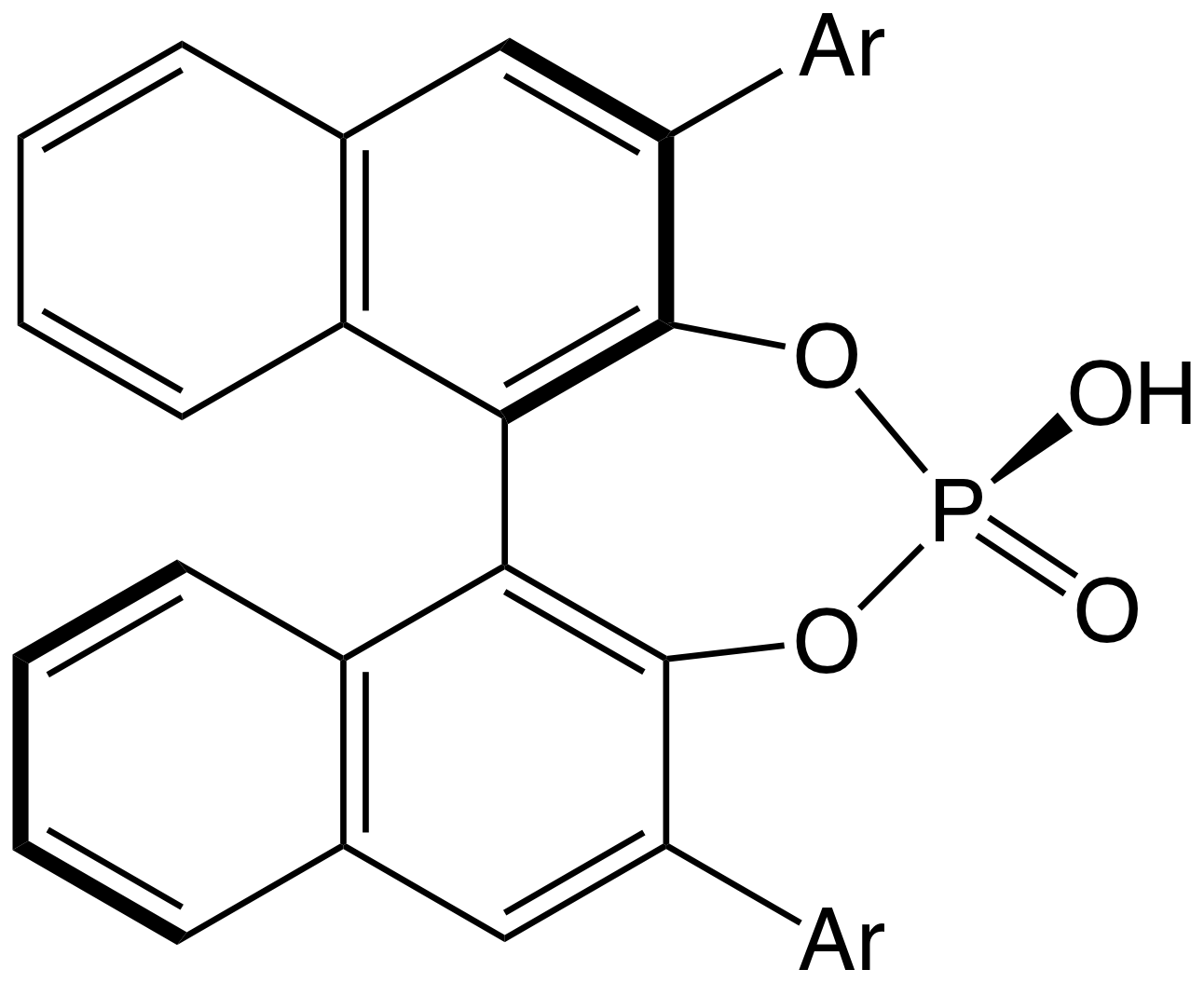
Structure of a common class of BINOL-derived chiral phosphoric acids. Catalysts of this type are also known as Akiyama–Terada catalysts (after Takahiko Akiyama and Masahiro Terada). Common examples of Ar include Ar = 4-NO_{2}-C_{6}H_{4}, 9-anthracenyl, and 2, 4, 6-iPr_{3}-C_{6}H_{2} (commonly known as TRIP).

In organic chemistry, chiral phosphoric acids are esters of phosphoric acid H_{3}PO_{4} that have chiral backbones. Well known examples include cyclic diesters derived from the BINOL and TADDOL motifs. These compounds are used in asymmetric catalysis as chiral Brønsted acids and/or hydrogen-bond donors. The conjugate bases are also used in generating chiral ion pairs.

In one example, they are used to catalyze the asymmetric desymmetrization by monohydrolysis of a diester.
