= Heterobimetallic catalysis =

Heterobimetallic catalysis is an approach to catalysis that employs two different metals to promote a chemical reaction. Included in this definition are cases (Scheme 1) where: 1) each metal activates a different substrate (synergistic catalysis, used interchangeably with the terms "cooperative" and "dual" catalysis.), 2) both metals interact with the same substrate, and 3) only one metal directly interacts with the substrate(s), while the second metal interacts with the first.

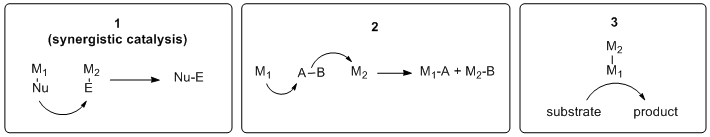
Scheme 1: Types of heterobimetallic catalysis

== In synergistic catalysis ==
Complexes of palladium catalyze cross-coupling of electrophiles with organometallic nucleophiles, including those derived from lithium, tin, zinc, and boron. One example is Sonogashira coupling, where catalytic amount of copper salt (e.g. CuI) reacts with a terminal alkyne (the pronucleophile) under basic conditions to generate a copper acetylide, which transmetalates onto an arylpalladium^{II} halide, regenerating the copper halide. Reductive elimination from the arylpalladium acetylide yields the cross-coupled product.

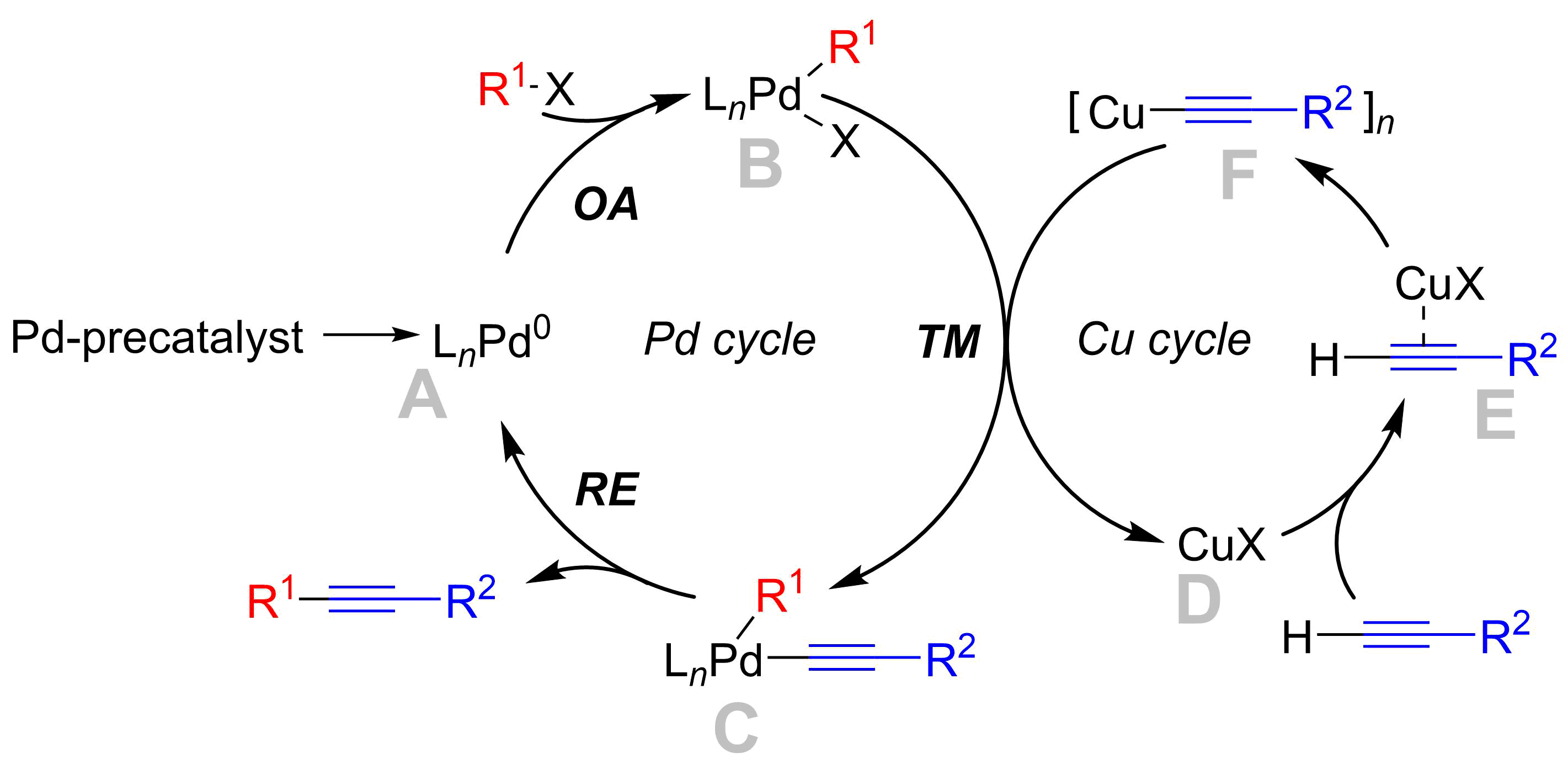

Other organic pronucleophiles are cross-coupled with arylpalladium halides in the following examples (Scheme 2):

1. Gold-catalyzed cyclization of allenoates followed by cross-coupling with aryl iodides yields 4-arylbutenolides

2. Borylcupration of styrenes followed by palladium-catalyzed cross-coupling with aryl halides generates α-aryl-β-boromethyl functionalized arenes. This reaction has been rendered diastereoselective in the case of cyclic styrenes, and an enantioselective variant has also been developed. Enantioselective hydroarylation of styrenes is accomplished similarly via a chiral copper hydride

3. Asymmetric conjugate reduction-allylation of α,β-unsaturated ketones is achieved by Cu-H mediated reduction and subsequent allylation via a chiral PHOX-ligated palladium catalyst

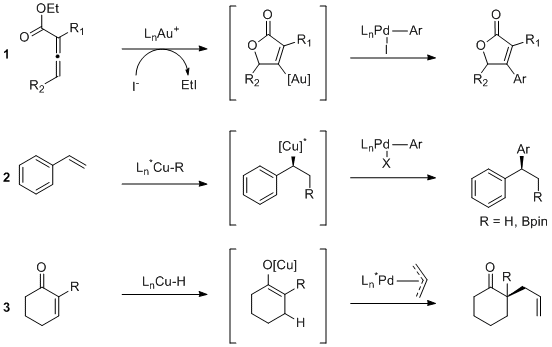
Alternative pronucleophiles employed in synergistic heterobimetallic catalysis

Also of note is the enantioselective allylation of activated nitriles (Scheme 3). A chiral bisphosphine-ligated rhodium catalyst activates the alpha-keto-nitrile component as its corresponding enolate, which is intercepted by a π-allylpalladium complex to yield the α-allylated nitrile in high enantiomeric excess. In the absence of the rhodium catalyst no enantioselectivity is observed, whereas the reaction does not proceed in the absence of palladium.

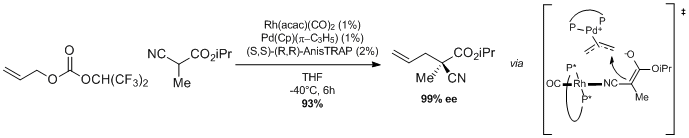
Scheme 3: Asymmetric allylation of nitrles with a heterobimetallic Rh/Pd catalyst system

== With preformed heterobimetallic catalysts ==
Catalyst systems in which both metal centers are contained in the same complex are also known (e.g. Shibasaki catalysts); further examples are provided below.

Ion-paired combinations of early and late transition metal complexes can simultaneously interact with a substrate as both Lewis acid and Lewis base. For example, carbonylative ring expansion of epoxides (Scheme 4) is accomplished by Lewis acid activation by cationic complexes of Cr^{III}, Ti^{III} or Al^{III} with simultaneous ring opening by the [Co(CO)_{4}]^{−} counterion. Carbonylation of the resultant alkylcobalt followed by lactonization releases the product.

Scheme 4: Carbonylation of epoxides catalyzed by a heterobimetallic ion pair

A heterobimetallic bond-breaking process is also employed in the IPrCuFp-catalyzed C-H borylation system developed by Mankad (Scheme 5). Bimetallic cleavage of the B-H bond in pinacolborane generates a copper hydride (IPrCu-H) and an iron boryl [(pin)B-Fp], the latter of which borylates unactivated arenes upon UV irradiation. Bimetallic reductive elimination of H_{2} from the combination of H-Fp and IPrCu-H restarts the catalytic cycle. The incorporation of copper into the catalyst is essential; C-H borylation using (pin)B-Fp alone is stoichiometric in iron due to dimerization of the HFp byproduct.

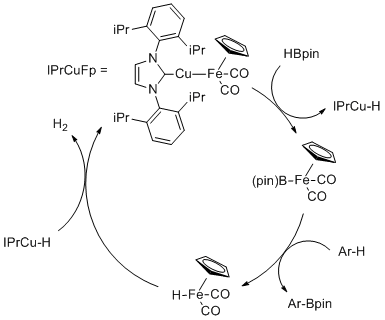
Scheme 5: UV-promoted C-H borylation of arenes catalyzed by IPrCuFp

Heterobimetallic catalysts containing persistent M^{1}-M^{2} bonds exhibit altered reactivity due to interaction of the two different metal centers. For example, allylic amination catalyzed by the binuclear complex [Cl_{2}Ti(N^{t}BuPPh_{2})_{2}-/Pd(η^{3}-CH_{2}C(CH_{3})CH_{2})]^{+} is exceptionally rapid. DFT studies suggest that a Pd→Ti dative interaction accelerates the typically slow reductive elimination step by withdrawing electron density from Pd in the transition state (Scheme 6).

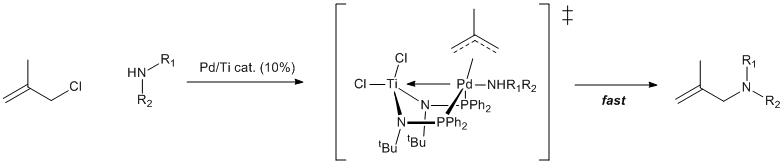
Scheme 6: Pd/Ti-catalyzed allylic amination with accelerated reductive elimination due to a Pd-to-Ti dative interaction

Silica-supported heterobimetallic tantalum iridium catalysts were shown exhibit drastically increased catalytic performances in H/D catalytic exchange reactions with respect to (i) monometallic analogues as well as (ii) homogeneous systems. The key transition state in the C-H activation pathway, computed by DFT, involves (i) donation from the C-H σ orbital to an empty d orbital on the electrophilic early metal (Ta) together with (ii) backdonation from a filled d orbital arising from the late metal (Ir) to the C-H σ* orbital for nucleophilic assistance (Scheme 7). The calculations have shown that steric effects imparted by the ancillary ligands could result in enormous differences in C-H activation energy barriers (ca. 20 kcal/mol-1) in this heterobimetallic cooperative mechanism, indicating that metals accessibility has a drastic impact on the catalytic performances.

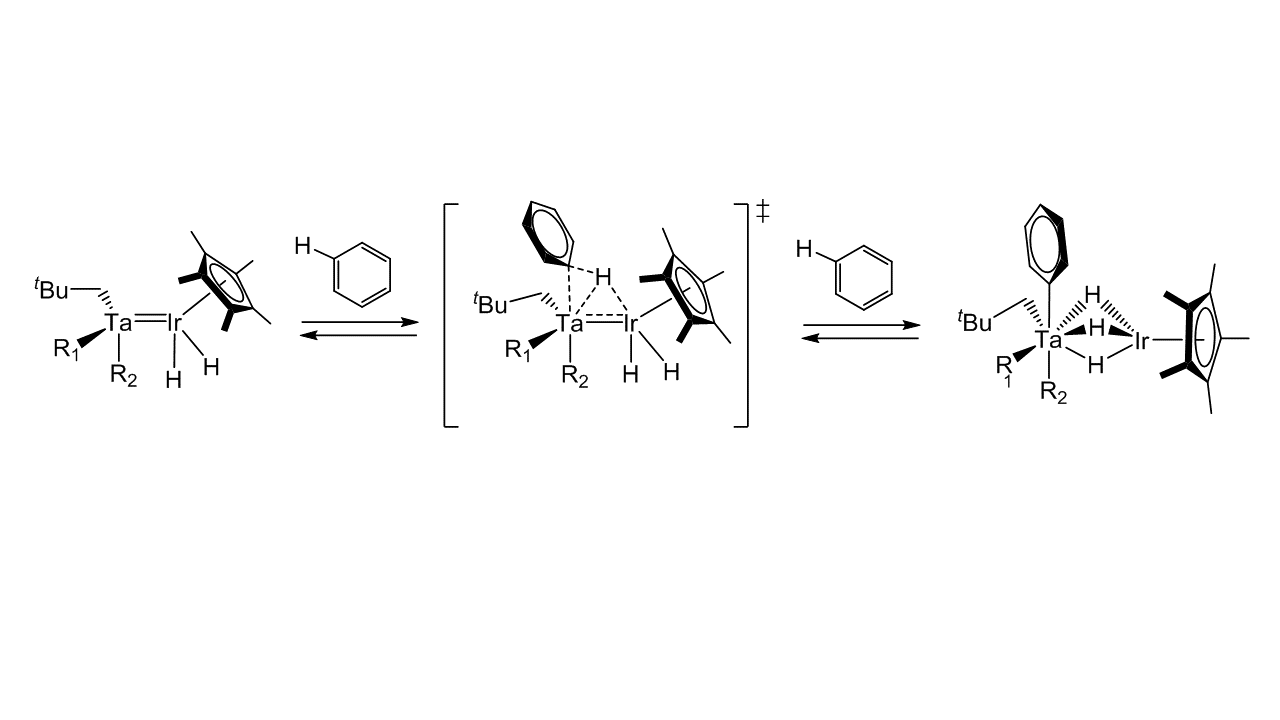
Scheme 7: C-H activation promoted by a heterobimetallic tantalum iridium catalyst

== In photoredox catalysis ==
The combination of photoredox catalysis with traditional transition metal catalysis enables the use of visible light to drive challenging steps in a catalytic cycle. For example, nickel-catalyzed aryl amination suffers from a difficult C-N reductive elimination step. Hence instead of nickel, expensive palladium-based precatalysts are often used in combination with sterically encumbered phosphine ligands to facilitate reductive elimination. A more recent approach employs an iridium-based photoredox catalyst to effect single-electron oxidation of the intermediate Ni^{II}-amido complex. The resulting Ni^{III}-amido rapidly undergoes reductive elimination, allowing the Ni-catalyzed aryl amination to proceed at room temperature without the use of phosphine ligands.

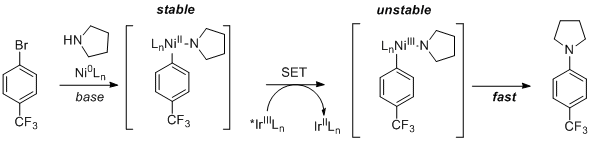
Scheme 8: Ni-catalyzed aryl amination driven by oxidation of Ni(II) to Ni(III) via photoredox catalysis

== Biological significance ==
Enzymes containing two or more different metal centers are found in several important biological systems; for example, the Mo-Fe protein of nitrogenase catalyzes the conversion of N_{2} to NH_{3} in nitrogen fixation. Of more relevance to human biology, Cu-Zn superoxide dismutase protects cells from oxidative stress by converting superoxide, O_{2}^{−}, to O_{2} and hydrogen peroxide
