= Seth Marder =

American chemist

Seth R. Marder is an American physical organic chemist best known for his development of the quantum mechanical foundations of nonlinear electro-optics in organic dyes and materials.

== Education ==
Marder obtained his Bachelor of Science degree in chemistry from the Massachusetts Institute of Technology in 1981, where he conducted undergraduate research under Alan Davison. He earned his Ph.D. in chemistry from the University of Wisconsin–Madison in 1985 under the supervision of Charles P. Casey. From 1985 to 1987, he was a postdoctoral research fellow at the University of Oxford working with Malcolm Green (chemist). Between 1987 and 1988, he was a National Research Council Resident Research Associate at the Jet Propulsion Laboratory of the California Institute of Technology, where his research advisors were Joseph W. Perry and Robert H. Grubbs.

== Career ==
He then moved to work on the technical staff of the NASA Jet Propulsion Laboratory (JPL) at California Institute of Technology (Caltech) from 1987–1998, where he was awarded the Lew Allen Award for Excellence in 1993. From 1998 to 2003 Marder was professor of chemistry and optical sciences at the University of Arizona before moving to Georgia Institute of Technology, where he served as a regents professor in the department of chemistry and biochemistry.

Marder served as the chair of the editorial board of the academic journal Materials Horizons from its inception until 2021.

As of 2021, Marder accepted a position at the University of Colorado Boulder in a joint appointment as a professor in the department of chemical and biological engineering and department of chemistry. He also serves as the director of CU Boulder's Renewable and Sustainable Energy Institute.

== Research interests ==
His research interests are in the development of materials for nonlinear optics, applications of organic dyes for photonic, display, electronic and medical applications, and organometallic chemistry. He currently studies polymers, nanostructures, and biomolecular solids.

== Fellowships ==
He is a Fellow of the Optical Society of America, the Society of Photo-optical Instrumentation Engineers (SPIE), the American Physical Society, the Royal Society of Chemistry and the American Association for the Advancement of Science.
