= Synergistic catalysis =

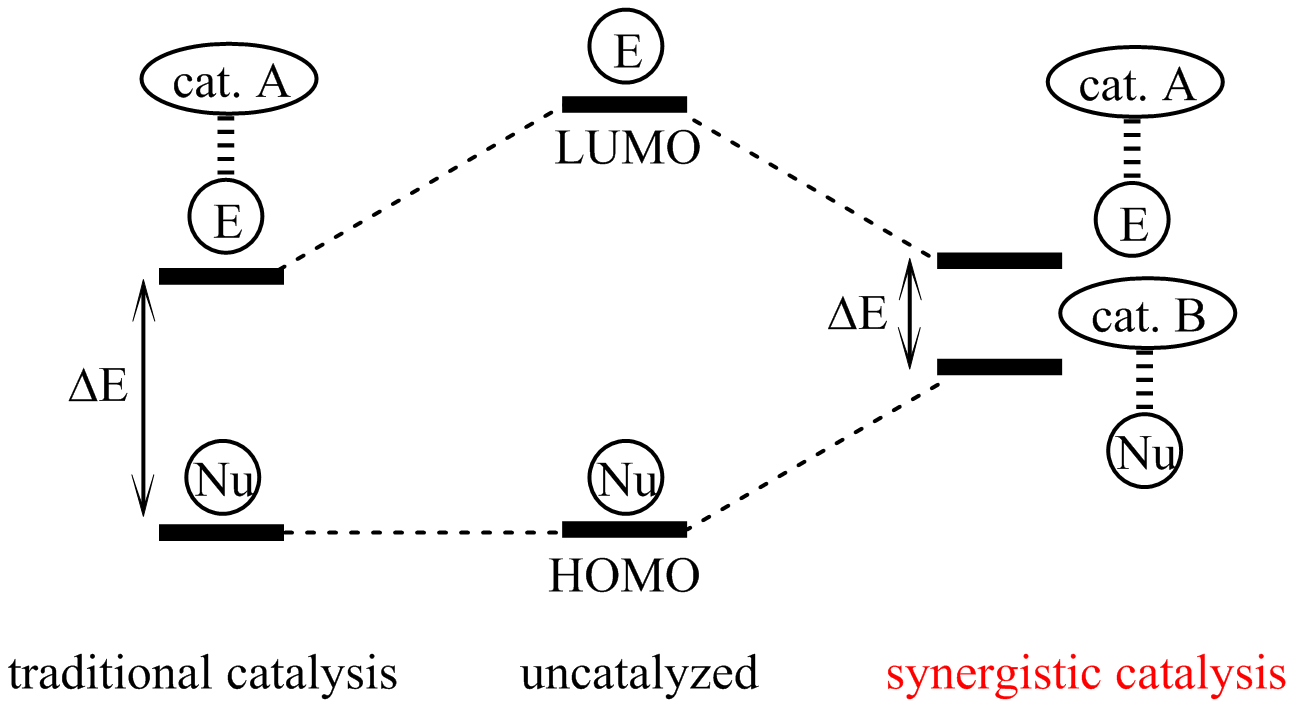
Energy gap between HOMO LUMO is brought even closer by two catalysts activating both substrates simultaneously.

Synergistic catalysis is a specialized approach to catalysis whereby at least two different catalysts act on two different substrates simultaneously to allow reaction between the two activated materials. While a catalyst works to lower the energy of reaction overall, a reaction using synergistic catalysts work together to increase the energy level of HOMO of one of the molecules and lower the LUMO of another. While this concept has come to be important in developing synthetic pathways, this strategy is commonly found in biological systems as well.

== Background ==
Synergistic catalysts have been used for a variety of reactions, especially when both substrates require some kind of significant activation either with stoichiometric amounts of an activator or through a separate reaction beforehand. Synergistic catalysts differ from other multi-catalyst systems by the nature that one catalyst activates one substrate while the other activates a different substrate. There are other types of multi-catalyst systems such as double activation catalysts where two catalysts are required to activate one substrate or cascade catalysts where one catalyst first transforms a substrate which then is activated by a second catalyst to react.

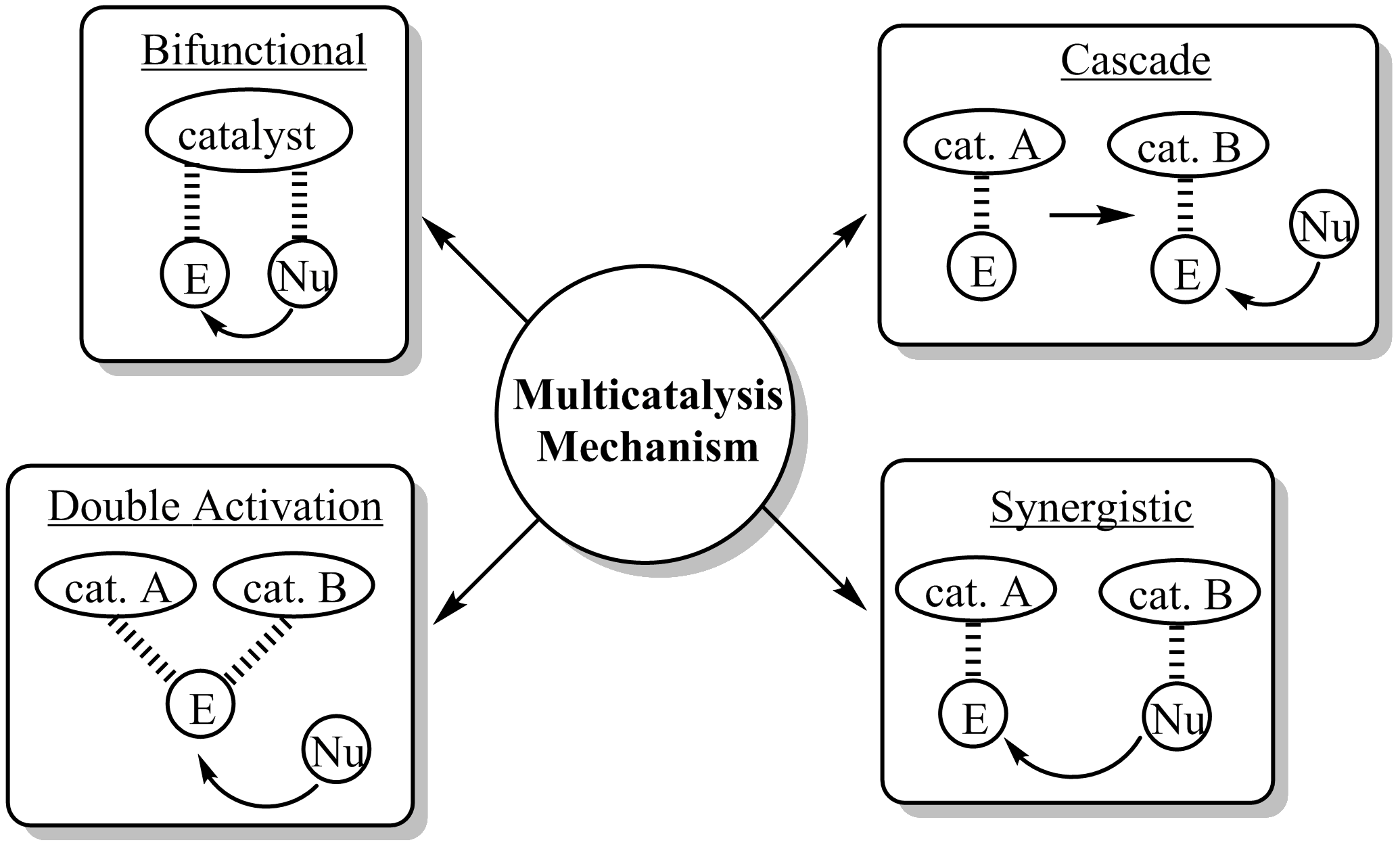
Classification of multicatalyst mechanism

While this field does show particular promise in affording molecules that could not be synthesized under normal synthetic strategies, there are a few issues that need to be addressed. One such issue is self quenching of the catalysts with each other. An example is if one of the catalysts is a Lewis acid and the other is a Lewis base, there is the possibility for formation of a Lewis acid base complex but this can be overcome by carefully choosing the pair.

== Examples ==
=== In Biology ===
Synergistic catalysts are very common in biological systems. The reactions occur by a molecule binding to a protein as a substrate and becoming active and being reacted with a coenzyme such as NADPH which is essentially an activated hydride. A specific example of this is shown by the synthesis of tetrahydrofolate via the enzyme dihydrofolate reductase. Dihydrofolate reductase catalytically activates dihydrofolate by protonating the imine, while NADPH, essentially a hydride source activated by the cofactor NADP^{+}, can then come in and add a hydride across the imine to afford the product.

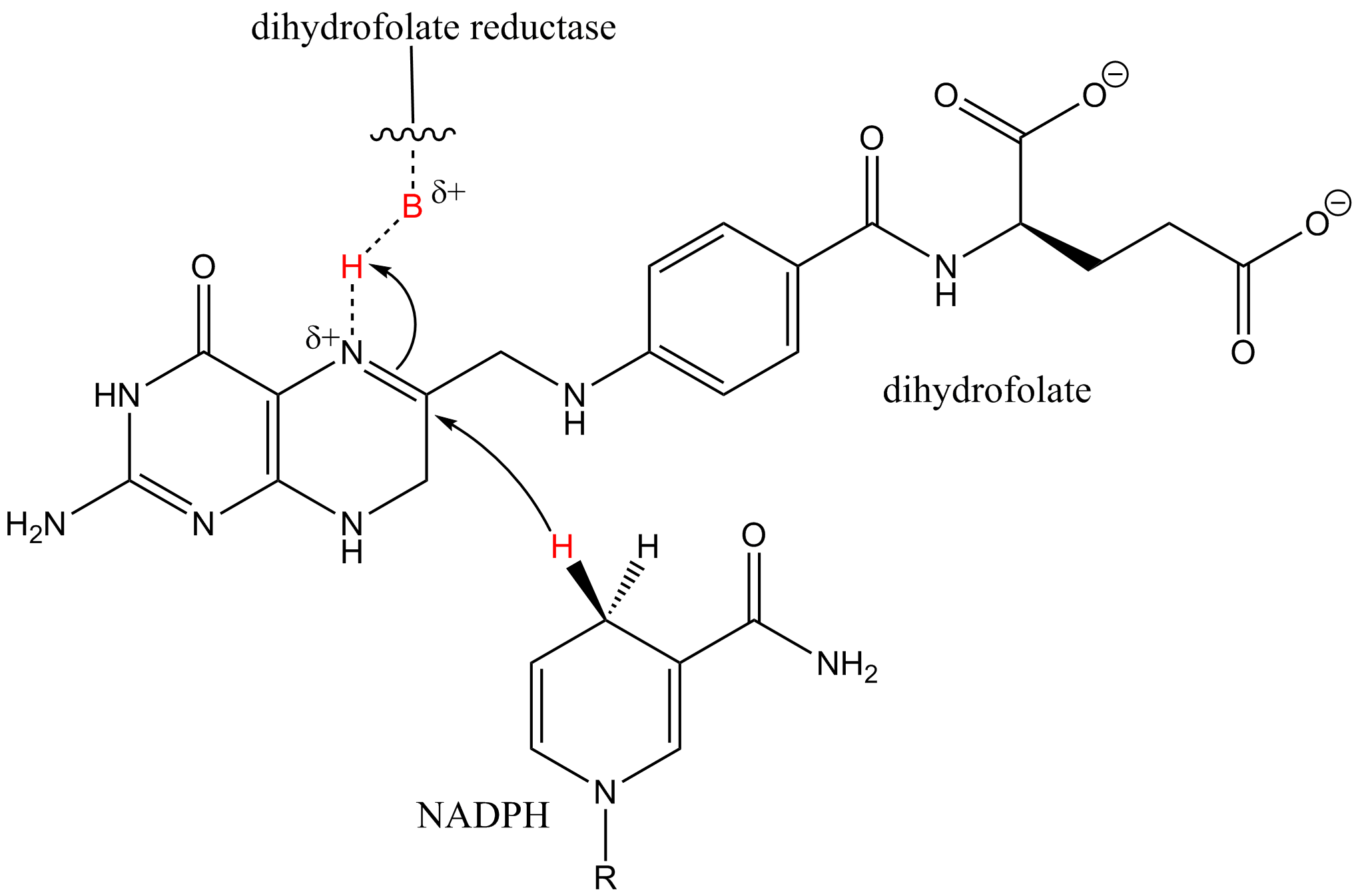
example of synergistic catalysis in biology

=== Dual Transition Metals Catalysis ===
Through the combination of two transition metal catalysts, synergistic catalysis has been reported to accelerate many chemical transformations, and even to induce high enantioselectivity, which could not be realized by the use individual catalysts. Sawamura et al. reported an early example of enantioselective allylic alkylation of nitriles catalyzed by a mixture of rhodium and palladium complexes. The palladium catalyst with chiral ligands alone gave a high yield, but no enantioselectivity was observed. The reaction did not proceed at all using the rhodium catalyst alone. Using both together, however, gave both a high yield and enantioselectivity for the transformation.

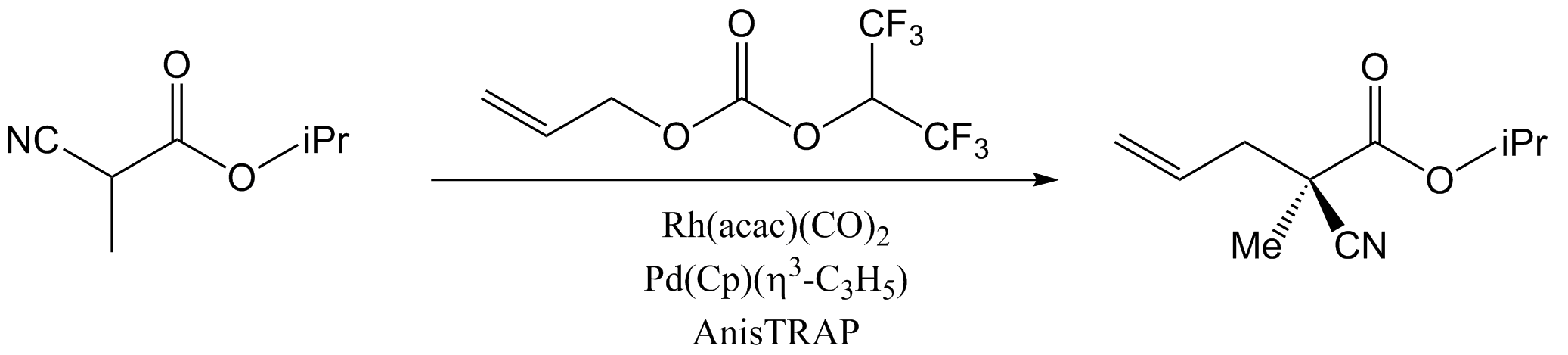
Synergistic catalysis developed by Sawamura et al.

They used trans-chelating chiral phosphine ligands (AnisTRAP) to generate chiral transition metal complexes. In their proposed mechanism schemes, an enolate is formed from an α-cyano ester and coordinates to the rhodium catalyst, while decarboxylative and oxidative addition of allyl carbonate to the palladium catalyst forms the π-allylpalladium (II) complex. Subsequently, the enolate attacks the π-allylpalladium (II) complex enantioselectively to afford the optically active product.

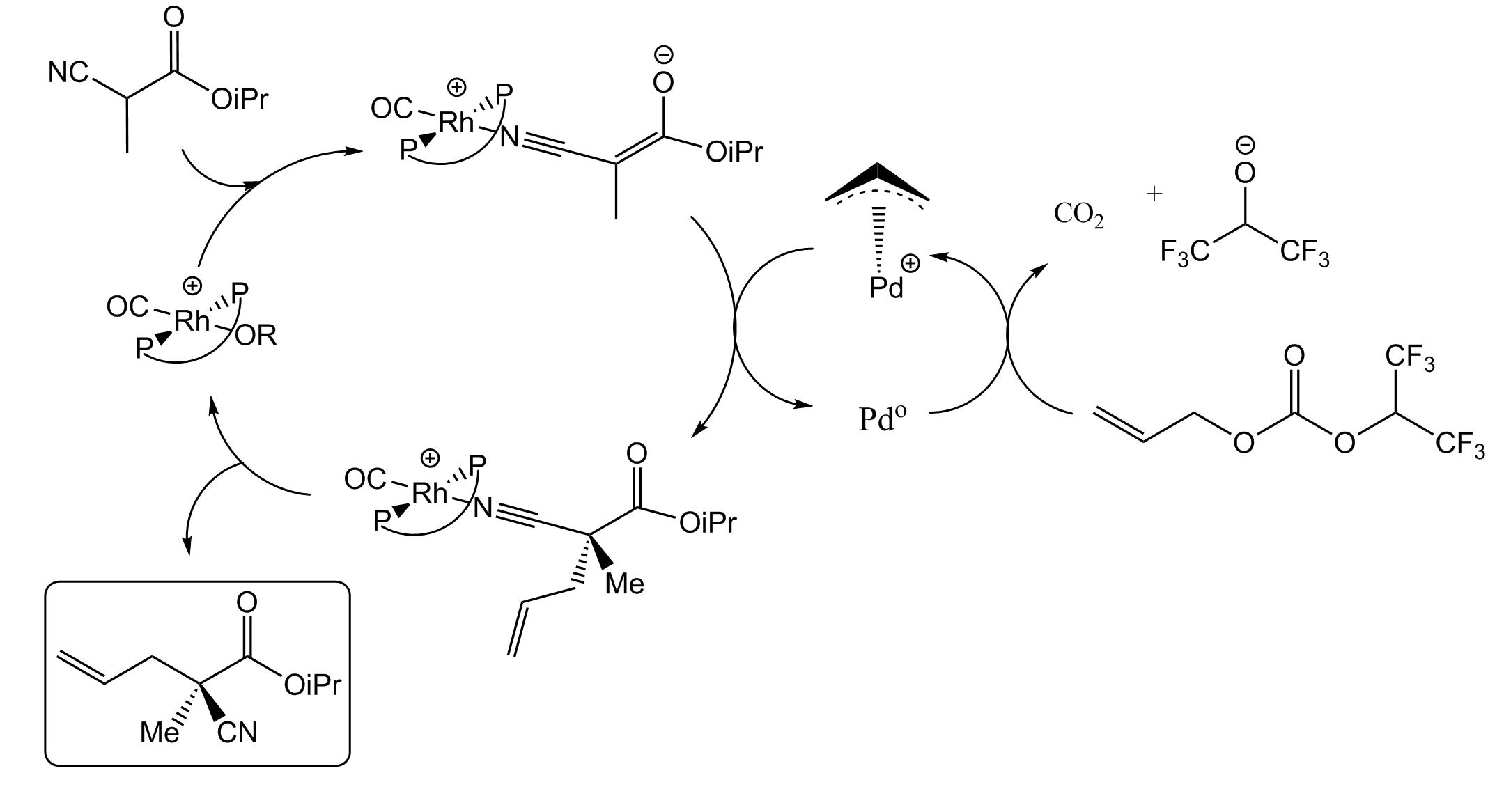
Dual transition metals catalytic cycles proposed by Sawamura et al.

=== Enantio- and Diastereoselective Catalysis ===
Besides using two transition metal catalysts, synergistic catalysis can also be carried out by utilizing one transition metal catalyst in combination with an organocatalyst. Here the synergistic α-allylation of aldehydes was accomplished by utilizing a transition metal complex in combination with a chiral amine catalyst. In 2013, Carreira and co-workers reported a highly enantio- and diastereoselective α-allylation of branched aldehydes. They used chiral primary amines and iridium catalysts complexed with chiral ligands to afford the product with two newly formed stereocenters at the α and β position.

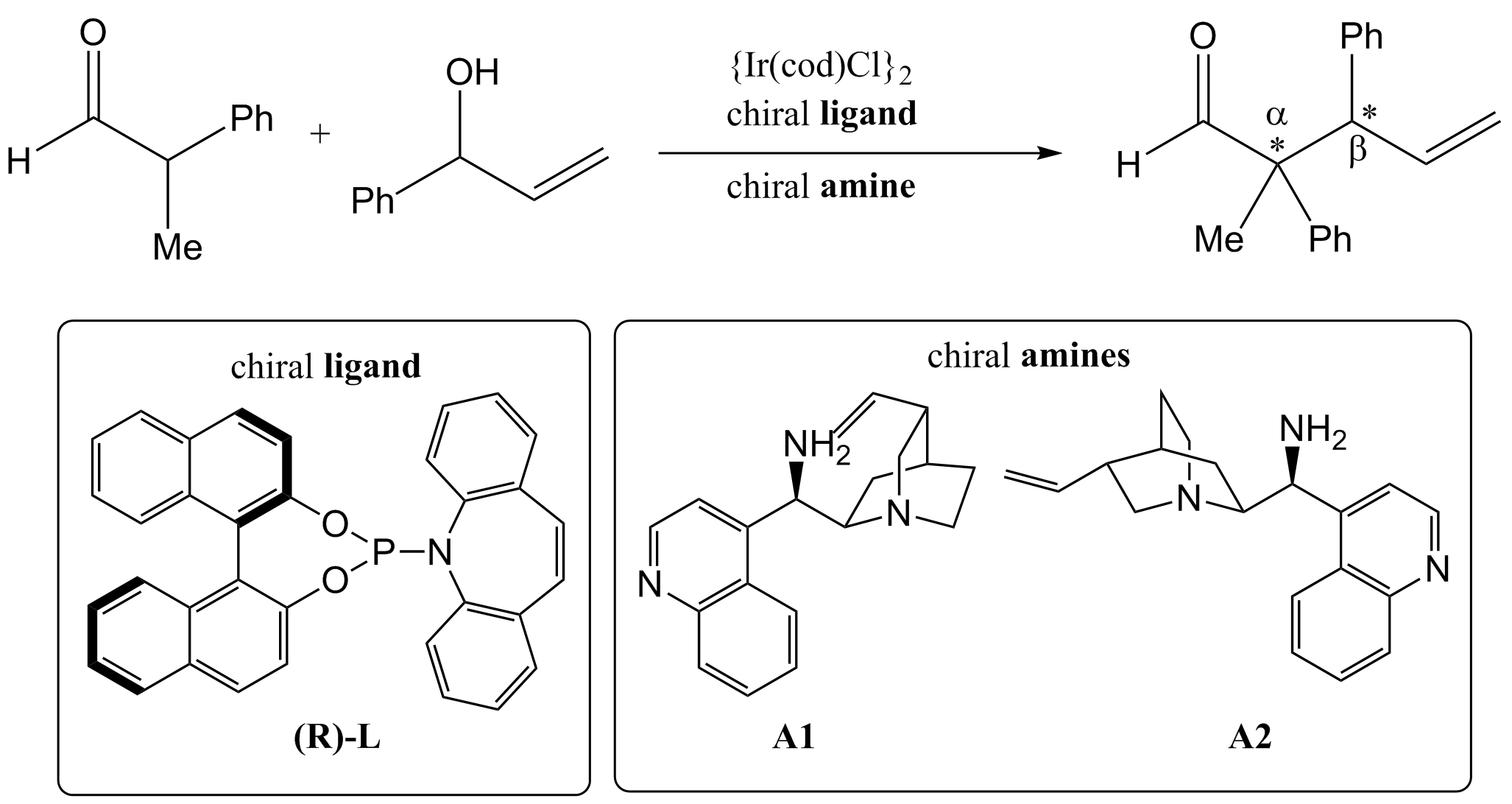
Dual catalysis developed by Krautwald et al.

By matching the two chiral amines and enantiomers of the chiral ligands, they were able to access all four possible stereoisomers of the product with good yields. More importantly, their catalytic system exhibits simultaneous and almost absolute control over the stereochemical configurations of both stereocenters.

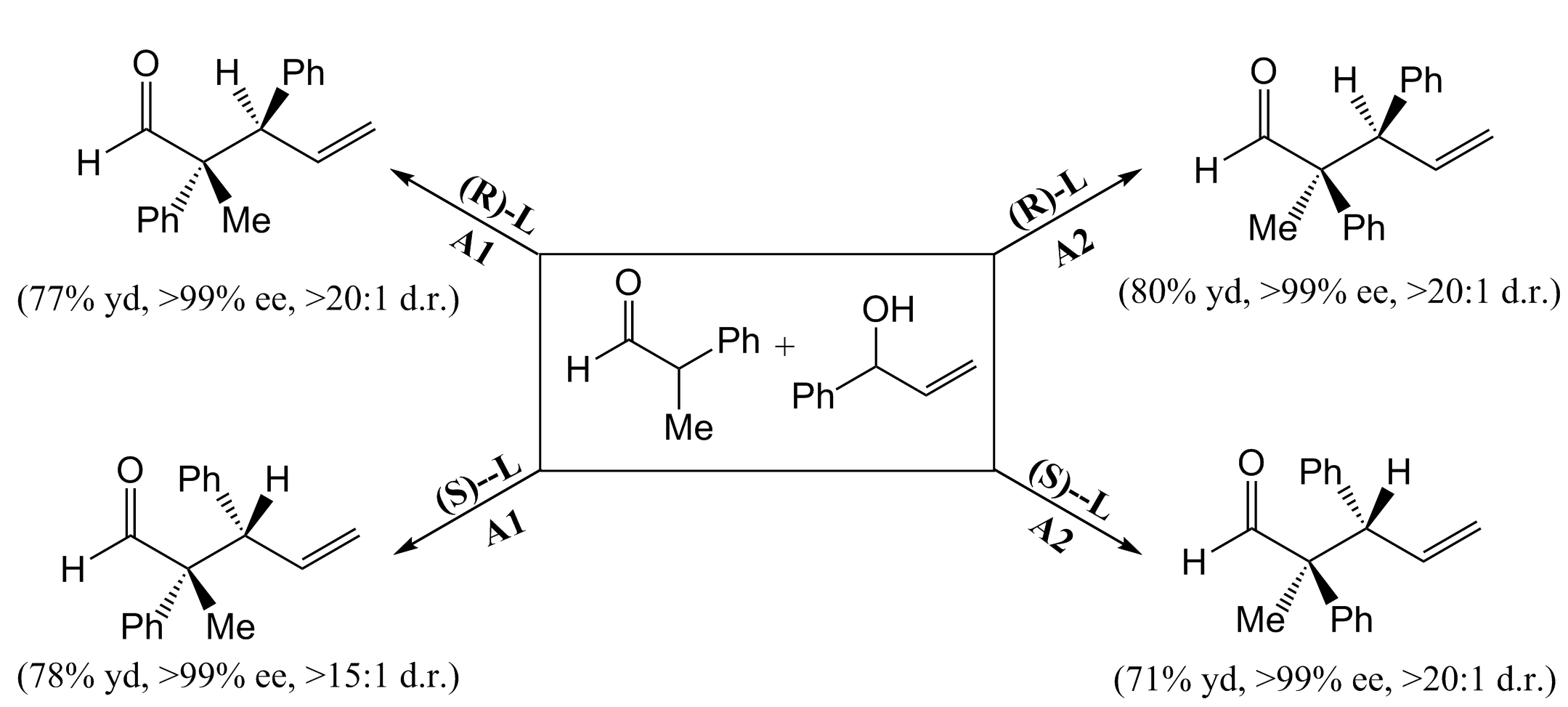
Simultaneous control on enantio and diastereoselectivity
