= Shibasaki catalyst =

Hetero-bimetallic coordination complex

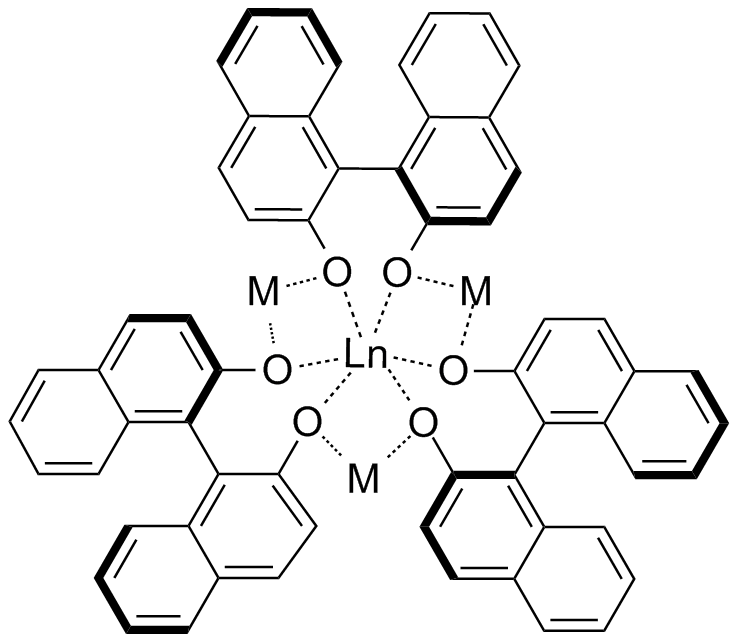
General structure of Shibasaki catalysts

Shibasaki catalysts constitute a class of hetero-bimetallic complexes with the general formula [Ln(binol)_{3}(M)_{3}] (M = alkali metal, Ln = lanthanide). They are named after Masakatsu Shibasaki, whose group first developed them, and are used as asymmetric catalysts.

== Development ==
The Shibasaki group produced the first chiral lanthanide-binaphtholate complex in 1992, which was used to catalyse nitroaldol reactions. The complex was not characterised but was the first to perform the reaction enantioselectively. This success led to further research which resulted in the development of heterometallic complexes with the formula [Ln(binol)_{3}(M)_{3}], the structure of which was elucidated by X-ray crystallography.

== Scope ==
Shibasaki catalysts are effective for a wide range of enantioselective reactions including nitroaldol, Michael, Diels-Alder and hydrophosphonylation reactions. Their effectiveness arises in part from their ability to act as both a Brønsted base by virtue of the metal alkoxide and a Lewis acid via the lanthanide ion. Enantioselectivity has been found to be sensitive to both Ln and M; with the nitroaldol reaction being most effective when Ln = Eu and M = Li whereas the Michael reaction requires Ln = La and M = Na. It was observed that alterations of Ln and M caused predictable changes in the bite angle of the binaphthol backbone.
