= 1,1′-Bi-2-naphthol =

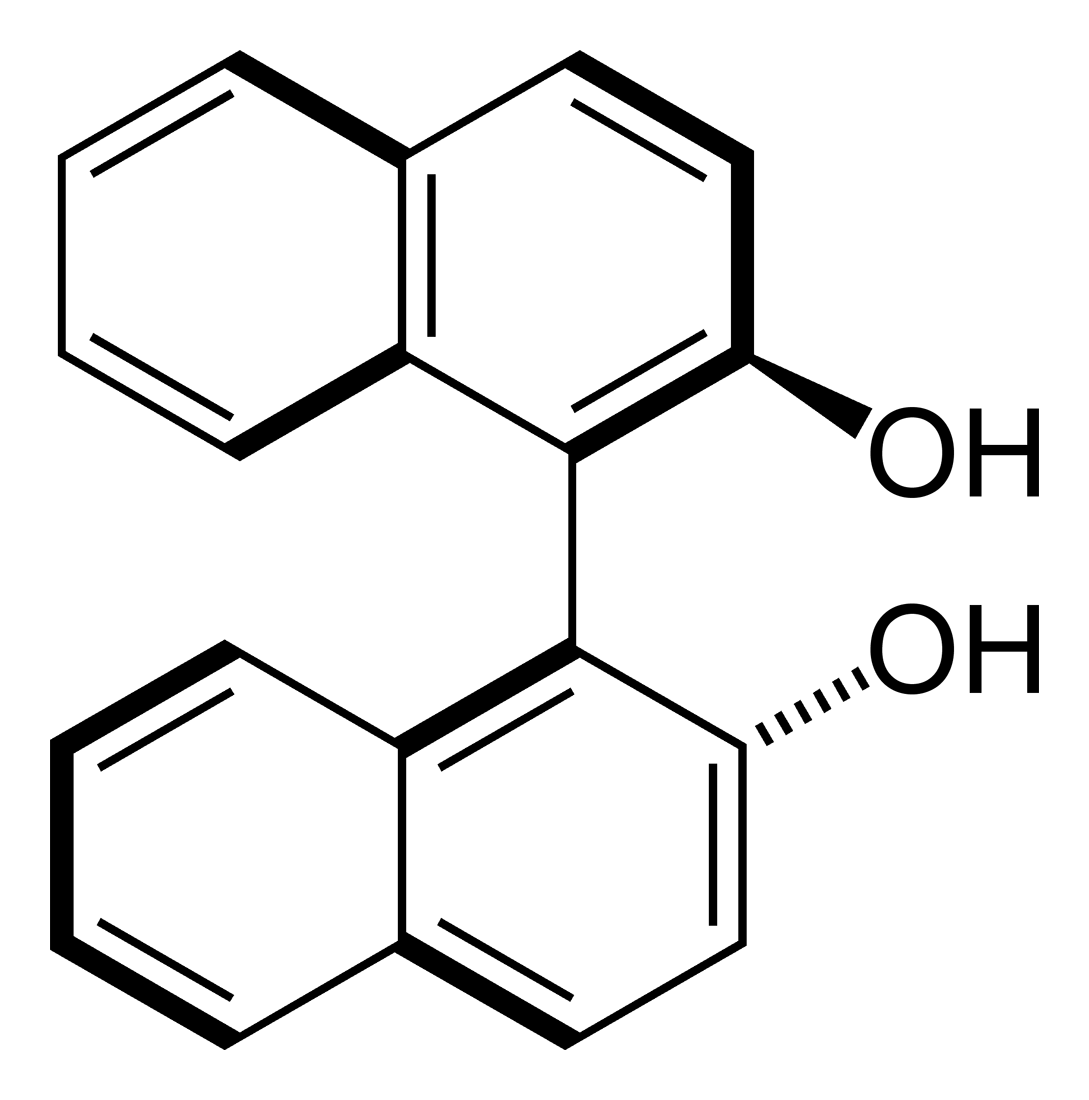
Skeletal formula of R-BINOL
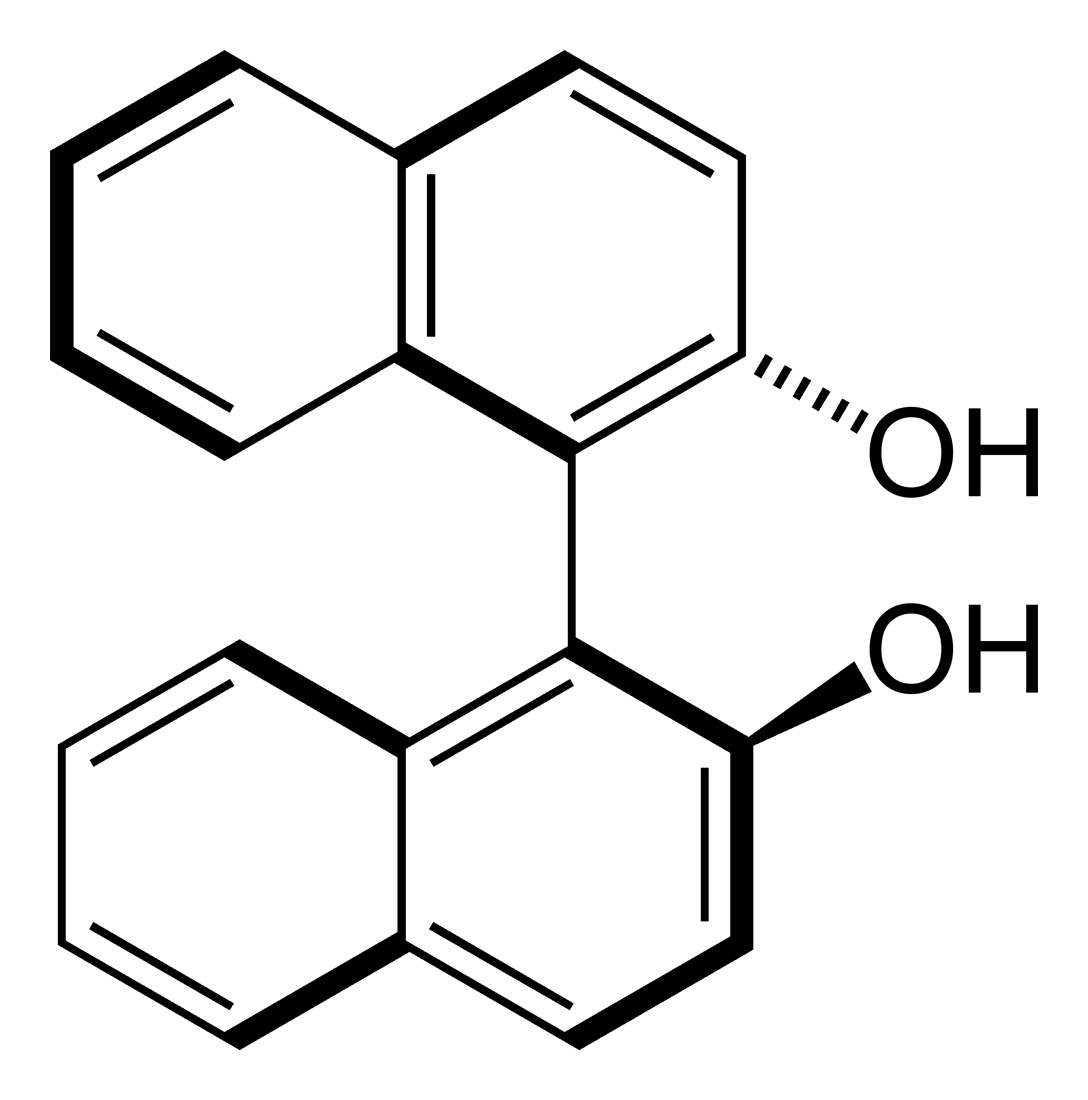
Skeletal formula of S-BINOL
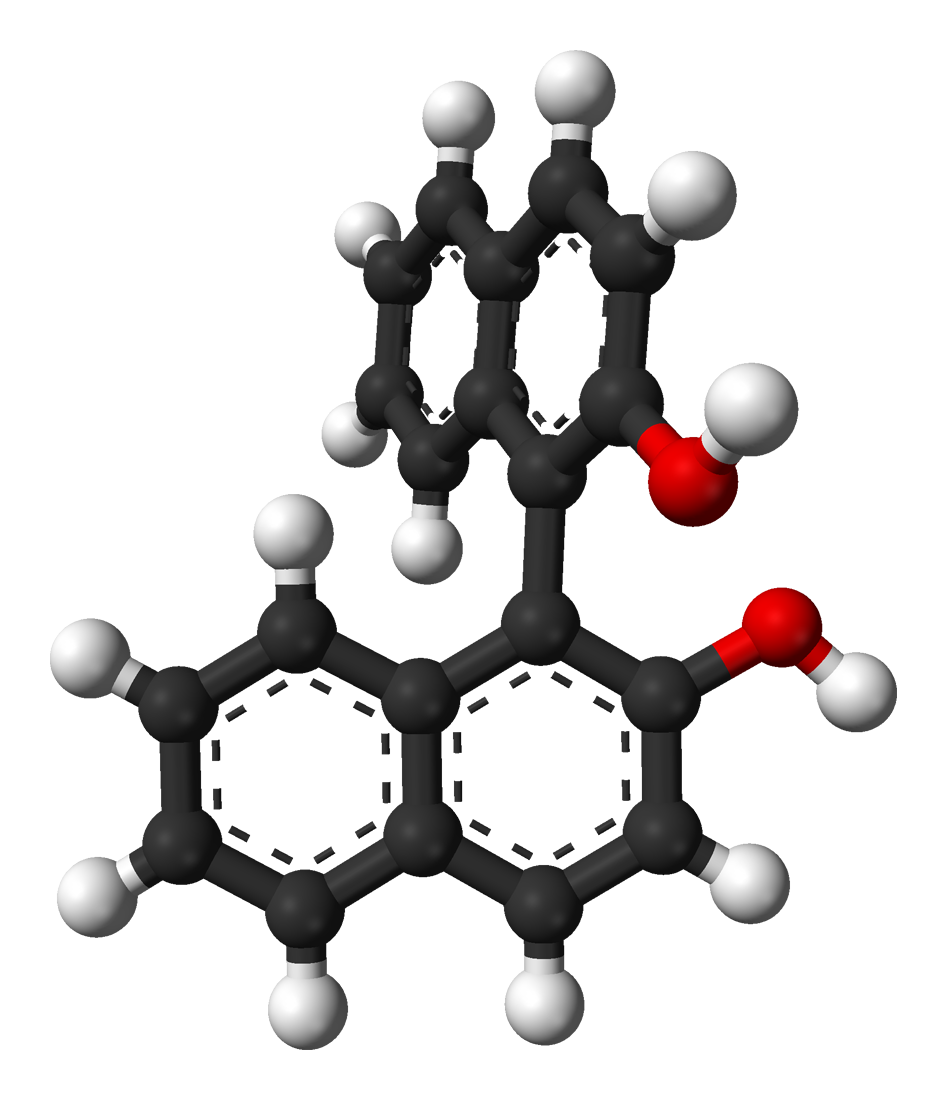
Ball-and-stick model of R-BINOL
(R)-(+)-BINOL
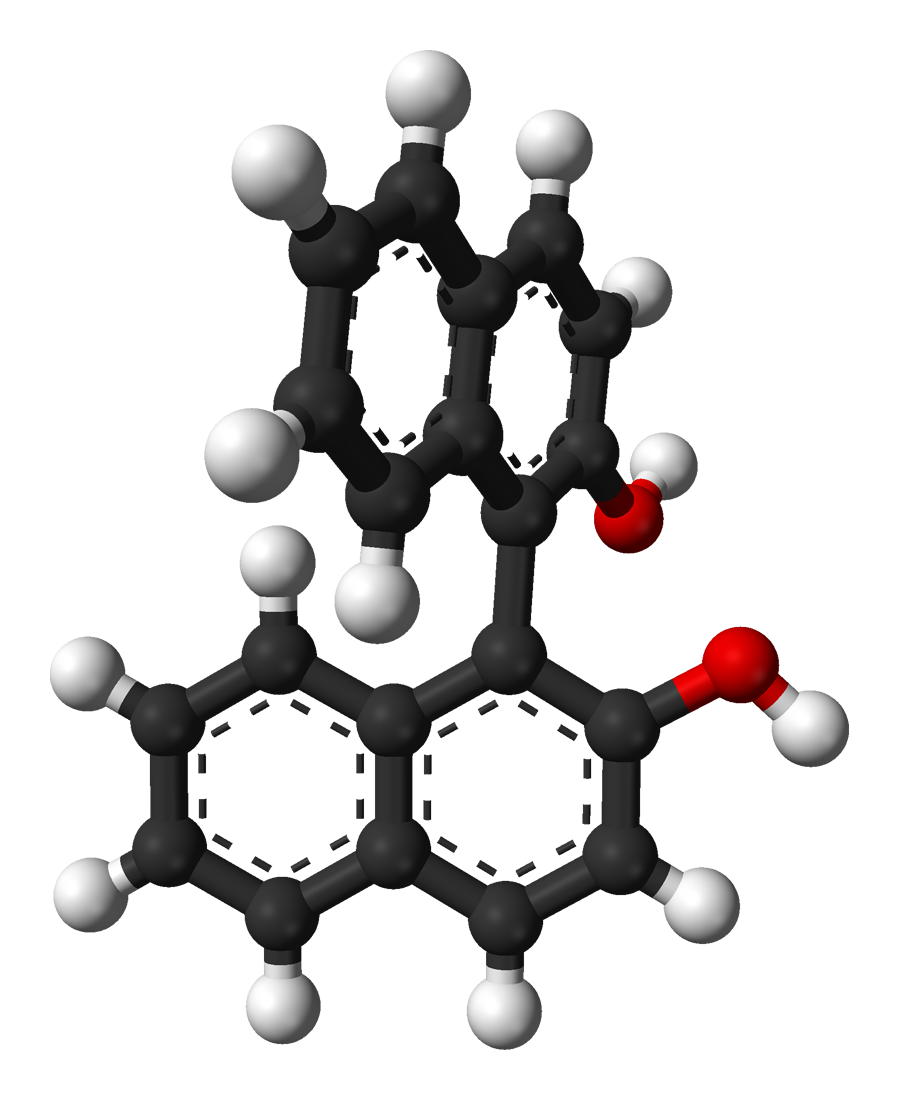
Ball-and-stick model of S-BINOL
(S)-(−)-BINOL

Names
- Preferred IUPAC name [1,1′-Binaphthalene]-2,2′-diol
- Other names: 1,1′-Bi-2-naphthol; 1,1-Binaphthol; BINOL; Binol

Identifiers
| CAS Number | 602-09-5 (R/S); 18531-94-7 (R)-(+); 18531-99-2 (S)-(−) |
| 3D model (JSmol) | (R/S): Interactive image |
| ChEMBL | ChEMBL138718 |
| ChemSpider | 11269 |
| ECHA InfoCard | 100.009.104 |
| PubChem CID | 11762 |
| UNII | 25AB254328 (R/S); M6IDZ128WT (R)-(+); 54OT5RRV4C (S)-(−) |
| CompTox Dashboard (EPA) | DTXSID9060526 |
- InChI: InChI=1S/C20H14O2/c21-17-11-9-13-5-1-3-7-15(13)19(17)20-16-8-4-2-6-14(16)10-12-18(20)22/h1-12,21-22H Key: PPTXVXKCQZKFBN-UHFFFAOYSA-N; InChI=1/C20H14O2/c21-17-11-9-13-5-1-3-7-15(13)19(17)20-16-8-4-2-6-14(16)10-12-18(20)22/h1-12,21-22H Key: PPTXVXKCQZKFBN-UHFFFAOYAX
- SMILES: (R/S): C1=CC=C2C(=C1)C=CC(=C2C3=C(C=CC4=CC=CC=C43)O)O

Properties
| Chemical formula | C_{20}H_{14}O_{2} |
| Molar mass | 286.32 g/mol |
| Melting point | 205 to 211 °C (401 to 412 °F; 478 to 484 K) |
- Except where otherwise noted, data are given for materials in their standard state (at 25 °C [77 °F], 100 kPa). verify (what is ?) Infobox references

1,1′-Bi-2-naphthol (BINOL) is an organic compound that is often used as a ligand for transition-metal catalysed asymmetric synthesis. BINOL has axial chirality and the two enantiomers can be readily separated and are stable toward racemisation. The specific rotation of the two enantiomers is 35.5° (c = 1 in THF), with the R enantiomer being the dextrorotary one. BINOL is a precursor for another chiral ligand called BINAP. The volumetric mass density of the two enantiomers is 0.62 g cm^{−3}.

== Preparation ==
The organic synthesis of BINOL is not a challenge as such but the preparation of the individual enantiomers is.

(S)-BINOL can be prepared directly from an asymmetric oxidative coupling of 2-naphthol with copper(II) chloride. The chiral ligand in this reaction is (S)-(+)-amphetamine.

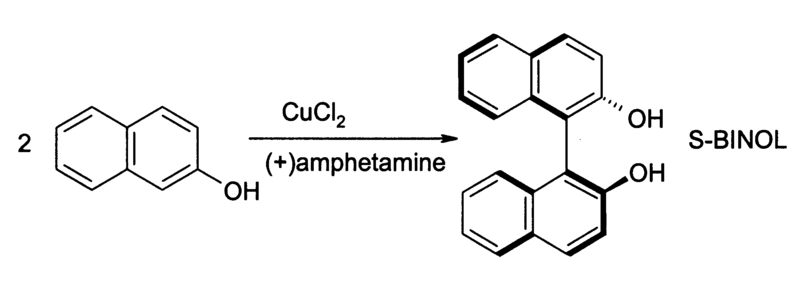

Racemic BINOL can also be produced using iron(III) chloride as an oxidant. The mechanism involves complexation of iron(III) into the hydroxyl, followed by a radical coupling reaction of the naphthol rings initiated by iron(III) reducing into iron(II).

Optically active BINOL can also be obtained from racemic BINOL by optical resolution. In one method, the alkaloid N-benzylcinchonidinium chloride forms a crystalline inclusion compound. The inclusion compound of the (S)-enantiomer is soluble in acetonitrile but that of the (R)-enantiomer is not. In another method BINOL is esterified with pentanoyl chloride. The enzyme cholesterol esterase hydrolyses the (S)-diester but not the (R)-diester. The (R)-dipentanoate is hydrolysed in a second step with sodium methoxide. The third method employs HPLC with chiral stationary phases.

== BINOL derivatives ==
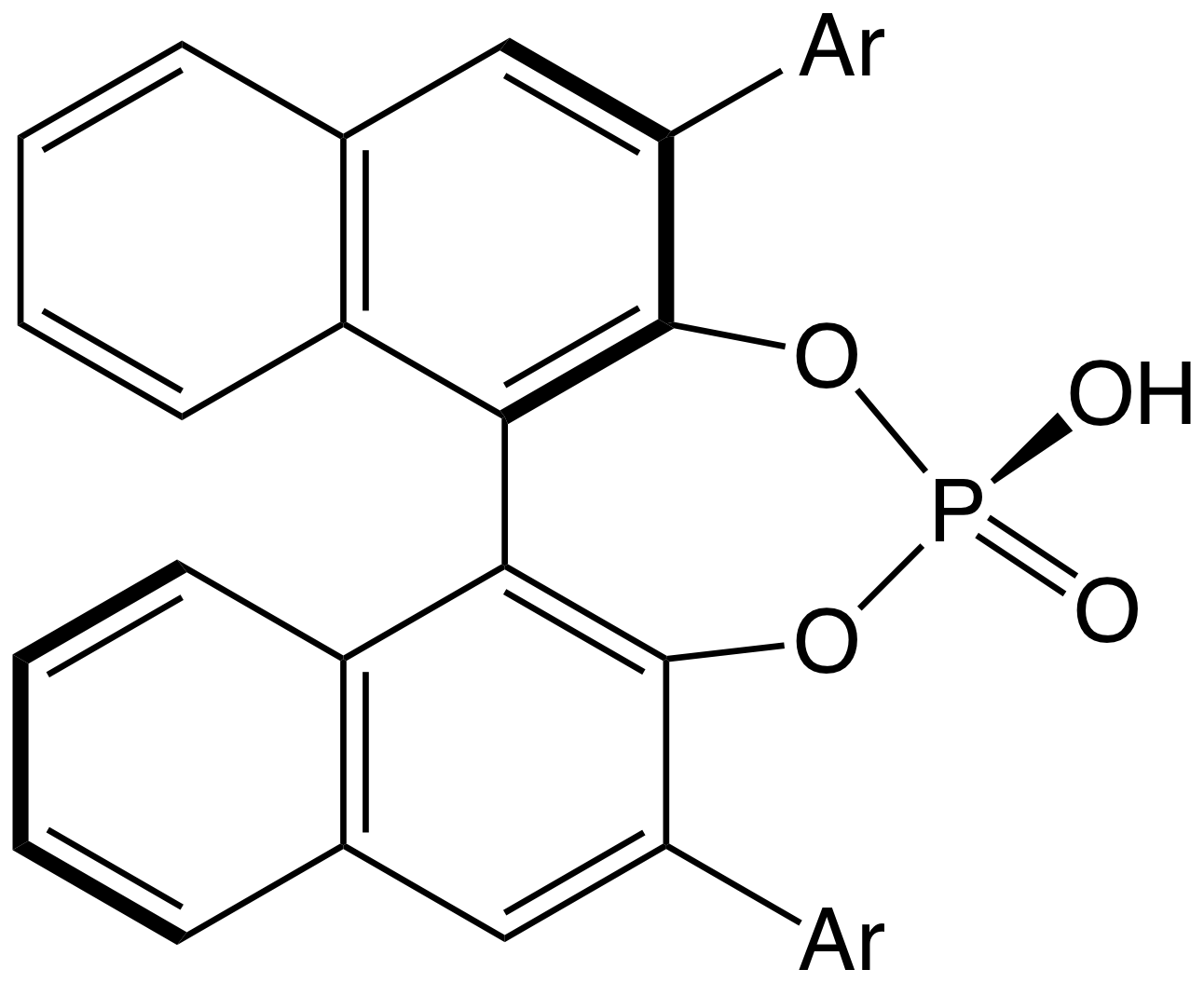
Structure of a chiral phosphoric acid derived from BINOL.

Aside from the starting materials derived directly from the chiral pool, (R)- and (S)-BINOL in high enantiopurity (>99% enantiomeric excess) are two of the most inexpensive sources of chirality for organic synthesis, costing less than US$0.60 per gram when purchased in bulk from chemical suppliers. As a consequence, it serves as an important starting material for other sources of chirality for stereoselective synthesis, both stoichiometric and substoichiometric (catalytic).

Many important chiral ligands are constructed from the binaphthyl scaffold and ultimately derived from BINOL as a starting material, BINAP being one of the most well known and important.

The compound aluminium lithium bis(binaphthoxide) (ALB) is prepared by reaction of BINOL with lithium aluminium hydride. In a different stoichiometric ratio (1:1 BINOL/LiAlH_{4} instead of 2:1), the chiral reducing agent BINAL (lithium dihydrido(binaphthoxy)aluminate) is produced.

It has been employed in an asymmetric Michael reaction with cyclohexenone and dimethyl malonate:

== See also ==
- Shibasaki catalysts
